= Dugandan Range =

Mountain range in Queensland, Australia

Dugandan Range is a mountain range in the Scenic Rim Region, Queensland, Australia.

== Geography ==
The range passes through the following localities (from north to south):

- Wyaralong, commencing south of Lake Wyalong (27.9437°S 152.8470°E) and forming part of the locality's south-western boundary
- Bromelton, forming its western boundary
- Coulson forming part of its south-eastern boundary
- Allandale, passing through from the north-east to the south-east where the range has its midpoint (28.0197°S 152.7465°E)
- Milford, roughly forming its south-eastern boundary
- Bunburra, forming part of its south-eastern boundary
- Cannon Creek, forming its western boundary
- Coochin, forming part of its eastern boundary
- Maroon, forming a small part of the north-western boundary where it terminates (28.1249°S 152.6880°E)
