= Charles Cossart =

Australian cricketer

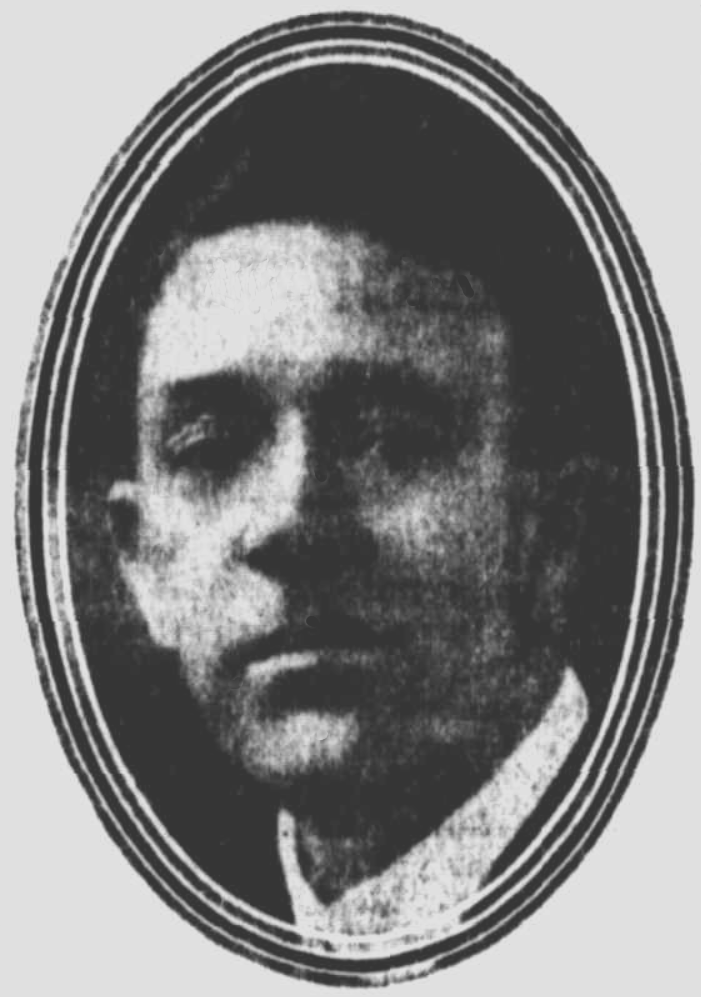

Personal information
- Born: 2 September 1885; Rosewood, Queensland, Australia
- Died: 6 June 1963 (aged 77); Boonah, Queensland, Australia

Domestic team information
- Years: Team
- 1913/14: Queensland

Career statistics
Competition	FC
Matches	1
Runs scored	0
Batting average	0.00
100s/50s	0/0
Top score	0
Catches/stumpings	1/–
- Source: Cricinfo, 1 October 2020

Charles Cossart (2 September 1885 – 6 June 1963) was an Australian cricketer who was described as a "forceful bat" and "clean hitter" of the ball. He played in one first-class match for Queensland in 1913 and played country cricket, mostly for Boonah and Dungandan, from at least 1904 to 1935. In his career he managed a timber mill in Dungandan with his brother and he served as President of the Boonah Hospital Committee and School of Arts Committee.

== Cricket career ==
Cossart began his cricketing career playing school cricket in 1901 for Ipswich Grammar. As of 1904 he was living in Boonah and that year the Boonah Cricket Club was re-established with Cossart being unanimously appointed club secretary. In 1906 he was selected for a combined Country side which played a Brisbane XI, and a report noted he took a good catch during the game. In 1909 a report described him as the "Boonah Hercules" after he scored 227 for Boonah setting the record for highest score in Ipswich and West Moreton cricket which resulted in him receiving many plaudits. In November 1909 he was named honorary inaugural secretary and treasurer of the Fassifern Cricket Association.

In the 1910-11 season Cossart scored 1291 runs at an average of 80.7 for various sides in country cricket and as of July 1911 he had settled at the Dungandan club. In January 1912 the Queensland Times, an Ipswich paper, criticized the Queensland selectors for overlooking country cricketers, naming Cossart as a potential Queensland batsman, and in September he scored a "vigorous" half-century in a game between a Country XI and a Brisbane XI. In November 1912 the Queensland Times criticized the selectors for omitting Cossart from the Queensland First-class side, suggesting if he came from Sydney he would be selected, however later that month he was selected in a trial match between two Queensland sides held to help selectors determine the State side. He failed to score a run and was not selected for Queensland.

In October 1913 he was selected as captain of a combined Country side which played Brisbane, and he scored a 50 bringing up his milestone with a six. In December 1913 he was selected to represent Queensland against a visiting New Zealand side and received congratulations from Ipswich press, and Brisbane press described him as a "big hitter" ahead of the game, however he scored ducks in both of Queensland's innings.

The First World War interrupted Cossart's career but he resumed country cricket after the war and scored a century for Dugandan in 1921. He played for Boonah again in the 1921-22 season and scored 744 runs at an average of 82.6. He continued playing into the 1930s, scoring a 50 for Dungandan as late as 1933, and retired in 1935 as a player and as secretary of the Fassifern Cricket Association as he felt he was losing use of his right hand and had been in ill-health. The clubs in the Association all expressed regret that he was resigning and as a token of their appreciation he was named a life member of the Association which took him by surprise and he found it gratifying that his work had been appreciated.

== See also ==
- List of Queensland first-class cricketers
