= Bunburra, Queensland =

Bunburra
- Suburb
- Interactive map of Bunburra
- Coordinates: 28.0580°S 152.6888°E
- Country: Australia
- State: Queensland
- LGA: Scenic Rim Region
- Location: 5.4 km (3.4 mi) S of Boonah; 45.9 km (28.5 mi) WSW of Beaudesert; 94.8 km (58.9 mi) SW of Brisbane CBD

Government
  - State electorate: Scenic Rim
  - Federal division: Wright

Area
  - Total: 21.3 km^{2} (8.2 sq mi)

Population
  - Total: 93 (2021 census)
  - Density: 4.37/km^{2} (11.31/sq mi)
- Time zone: UTC+10:00 (AEST)
- Postcode: 4310
Suburbs around Bunburra
Dugandan	Milford	Milford
Wallaces Creek	Bunburra	Cannon Creek
Wallaces Creek	Coochin	Cannon Creek

Bunburra is a rural locality in the Scenic Rim Region, Queensland, Australia. In the 2021 census, Bunburra had a population of 93 people.

== History ==
Bunburra Provisional School opened on 8 July 1889. On 1 January 1909, it became Bunburra State School. It closed in 1946.

== Demographics ==
In the 2016 census, Bunburra had a population of 90 people. The locality contains 43 households, in which 53.3% of the population are males and 46.7% of the population are females with a median age of 55, 17 years above the national average. The average weekly household income is $1,187, $251 below the national average.

In the 2021 census, Bunburra had a population of 93 people.

== Education ==
There are no schools in Bunburra. The nearest government primary schools are Boonah State School in Boonah to the north and Mount Alford State School in Mount Alford to the west. The nearest government secondary school is Boonah State High School in Boonah.
