= Maroon State School and Maroon War Memorial =

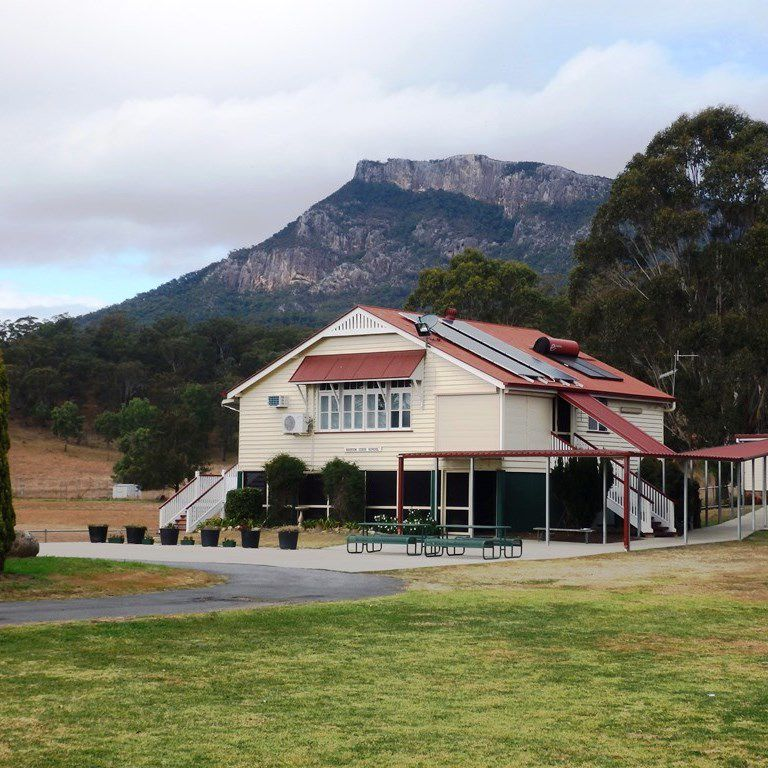
- 1938 teaching building with Mount Maroon in the background, from NW, 2015

- Location within Queensland
- 28.1720°S 152.7136°E
- Location: 2772 Boonah Rathdowney Road, Maroon, Scenic Rim Region, Queensland, Australia

History
- Design period: 1914–1919 (World War I)
- Built: 1910, 1937–1938, 1937

Queensland Heritage Register
- Official name: Maroon State School and Maroon War Memorial
- Type: state heritage
- Designated: 9 October 2015
- Reference no.: 650004
- Type: Education, research, scientific facility: school – state (primary)
- Theme: Creating social and cultural institutions: Commemorating significant events; Educating Queenslanders: Providing primary schooling

Maroon State School and Maroon War Memorial is a heritage-listed state school and war memorial at 2772 Boonah Rathdowney Road, Maroon, Scenic Rim Region, Queensland, Australia. It was built in 1910. It was added to the Queensland Heritage Register on 9 October 2015.

== History ==
Maroon State School, located south of Boonah, near Queensland's border with New South Wales, opened in 1891 as Maroon Provisional School, soon after closer settlement commenced in the district. The school was transferred to Department of Public Instruction ownership in 1898 and became Maroon State School in 1909. A playshed was added in 1910, and a teacher's residence was constructed in 1937. The original teaching building was replaced with a small timber school building in 1938. The school buildings are set amongst mature trees, and the district's 1920 war memorial stands at the front (northeast corner) of the school grounds. The result is a picturesque view from the road, past the war memorial to the school, with Mount Maroon as the backdrop. The school has been in continuous operation since establishment and has been a focus for the local community as a place for important social and cultural activity.

European occupation of the Maroon district commenced in the 1840s. Maroon Station, initially called Melcombe, was taken up by William O'Grady Haly in 1843, and the lease was eventually obtained by Thomas Lodge Murray-Prior, well-known pastoralist and politician, in 1864. Some local farming began in 1870, but closer settlement began in earnest from 1887, the year the Fassifern Railway was extended to Dugandan, just south of Boonah. Blocks of 160 acres (65 ha) were taken up to the south and east of Maroon Station. Local farming included dairying, pig rearing, and crops (including lucerne, maize and cotton), and timber-getting was also a local industry. In the locality of Maroon, two shops existed by 1887, a creamery (later a cheese factory until the 1900–1902 drought) was opened in the mid-1890s, and a School of Arts was built in 1903–04. An Anglican church was dedicated in 1907, and a Methodist church in 1914. Early local government was provided by the Goolman Divisional Board, (1879), then the Goolman Shire Council (1903) which became Boonah Shire Council in 1937.

Closer settlement at Maroon was soon followed by calls for a local school. The establishment of schools was considered an essential step in the development of early communities and integral to their success. Locals often donated land and labour for a school's construction and the school community contributed to maintenance and development. Schools became a community focus, a symbol of progress, and a source of pride, with enduring connections formed with past pupils, parents, and teachers. The inclusion of war memorials and community halls reinforced these connections and provided a venue for a wide range of community events in schools across Queensland. A provisional school could be opened with as few as 15 (later 12) pupils. The Board of General Education gave financial assistance to local committees to set up and maintain these schools. The local committee provided a building and found a teacher, and the Board paid the teacher's salary relative to the number of pupils.

To help ensure consistency and economy, the Queensland Government developed standard plans for its school buildings. From the 1860s until the 1960s, Queensland school buildings were predominantly timber-framed, an easy and cost-effective approach that also enabled the government to provide facilities in remote areas. Standard designs were continually refined in response to changing needs and educational philosophy and Queensland school buildings were particularly innovative in climate control, lighting, and ventilation. Standardisation produced distinctly similar schools across Queensland with complexes of typical components.

In Maroon, a provisional school was opened in 1891 due to the efforts of the local community. A school building committee was elected at a meeting on 31 January 1891, and a written application for a provisional school was made in late May, when the building was almost finished. Materials were donated by committee members; and the school, built with volunteer labour, was furnished and equipped by 30 May, and opened on 15 July 1891, at no cost to the government. The building was also used by the community for public meetings, religious services and music lessons, and as a library (before the School of Arts opened).

The school was built on land (just under 2 acres (0.81 ha)) donated by local landowner Thomas de Montmorenci Murray-Prior, chairman of the committee, who had inherited Maroon Station from his father, and was later transferred to the Crown in 1898 - the year that the Department of Public Instruction took over the school at the request of the school committee.

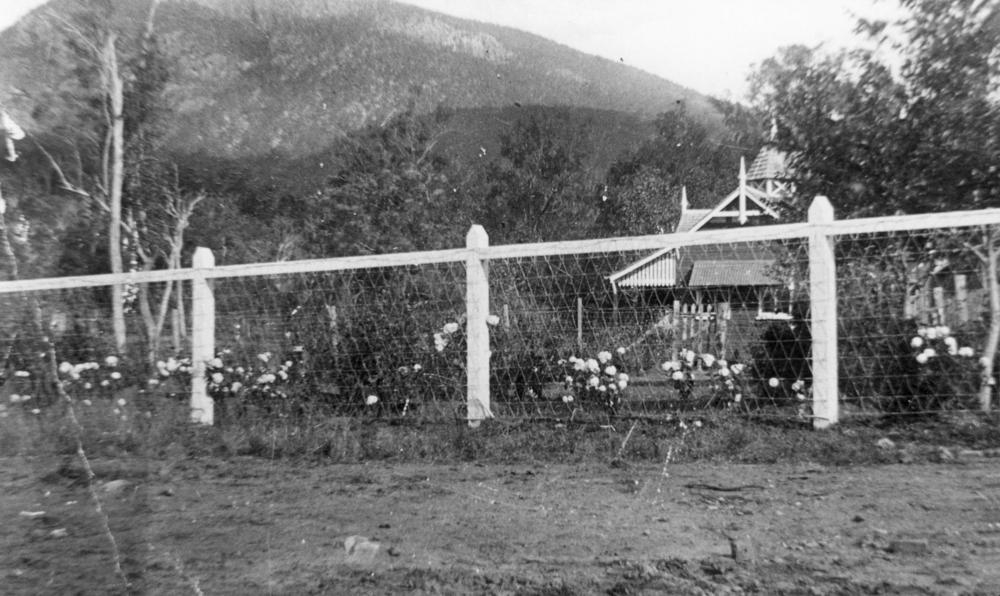
The original school building, 1900–1910, "one of the prettiest in West Moreton"

The low-set teaching building, although hailed as "one of the prettiest in West Moreton", soon proved inadequate for growing student numbers. Enrolment was 36 in 1896, and in 1906, with enrolment at 54, the committee asked for it to be enlarged. The additions, consisting of a second 24-by-12-foot (7.3 m × 3.7 m) classroom and an additional verandah, were completed by June 1907, the community paying one fifth of the cost. By 1908, the school bell was mounted on a free-standing timber frame adjacent to the provisional school building.

In 1909, the school became Maroon State School. That year, by lowering the required minimum average number of pupils for a state school from 30 to 12, the Department of Public Instruction upgraded the majority of provisional schools to state school status. By 1967, any remaining provisional schools either had been converted to state schools or had closed.

The Maroon State School's grounds were improved in 1910 by the addition of a playshed. The Queensland education system recognised the importance of play in the school curriculum and, as school sites were typically cleared of all vegetation, the provision of all-weather outdoor space was needed. Playsheds were designed as free-standing shelters, with fixed timber seating between posts and earth or decomposed granite floors that provided covered play space and doubled as teaching space when required. These structures were timber-framed and generally open sided, although some were partially enclosed with timber boards or corrugated galvanised iron sheets. The hipped (or less frequently, gabled) roofs were clad with timber shingles or corrugated iron. Playsheds were a typical addition to state schools across Queensland between c. 1880s and the 1950s, although were less frequently constructed after c. 1909, with the introduction of highset school buildings with understorey play areas. Built to standard designs, playsheds ranged in size relative to student numbers.

In 1910, the Department of Public Instruction approved a 24-by-12-foot (7.3 m × 3.7 m) hip-roofed timber playshed to cater for Maroon State School's students. The playshed was constructed by B Green at a cost of £49, and was a characteristic example of a six-post type, with light timber framing and a corrugated metal-clad roof. Each of the corner timber posts were "silled and strutted" below ground level, and timber seats were fixed to the posts on the two longer sides of the shed. A tank and spouting were added the following year, at a cost of £18.

In 1917 the school committee requested a new teaching building, as the 1891 building was too narrow, had small windows, was not ceiled or lined, and the shingles leaked. Instead, the shingles were replaced with corrugated iron in 1924, and larger windows were later added to deal with the increased internal heat.

In 1938 Maroon State School finally received its new teaching building; a standard design small timber school building (Type E/T1). This type of building was constructed in Queensland between 1930 and 1946 and was a continuation of earlier types of country schools. The roof span was generally 18 feet (5.5 m), and the building was highset, with two verandahs. The type was not designed for expansion, being built for a set number of students - either 24, 40, 60 or 80. The new building, for 60 pupils, was constructed by JW Schultz of Boonah for £472, and was completed during the 1937–38 school holidays, opening for use on 24 January 1938.

Plans from 1937 indicate that the single room building was a timber-framed and weatherboard-clad structure, highset on tall timber stumps, with a gabled roof and verandahs on the east and west sides. The class room was 18 by 30 feet (5.5 m × 9.1 m). Timber stairs provided access to the 8-foot (2.4 m) wide verandahs, which had enclosed corner hat rooms at the southern ends. Banks of timber-framed casement windows with fanlights and skillion sunshades were centred on the north and south gable end walls. Doors from the verandah to the classroom were positioned slightly north of the centre, to accommodate two classes in the one room: a smaller, east-facing class to the north; and a larger, west-facing class to the south. This allowed for natural light to enter from the student's left, an optimum arrangement espoused by educators at the time. The ceiling was coved with an exposed tie rod and an off-centre latticed ceiling vent between the doors. The understorey provided sheltered play space and was partly enclosed with timber battens and corrugated metal; timber seats ran along the south wall and into the southwest corner.

By the time the new teaching building was in use, the school's teacher was occupying the school's first teacher's residence, built during 1937. This was constructed by JET Speer of Moorooka for £649. Most Queensland state schools incorporated a teacher's residence on the site, particularly in rural areas. In Australia, only Queensland offered free accommodation to teachers, the government policy applying to male teachers (only) from as early as 1864. This was partial recompense for a low wage, an incentive for teacher recruitment in rural areas and provided onsite caretakers. Following World War I, teacher shortages were blamed on the inadequacy and shortage of teachers' residences. Consequently, many new teacher residences were constructed across Queensland in the 1930s and again following World War II.

Residences designed by the Department of Public Works' architects, and constructed to the high standard demanded by the state, were typically of a higher-quality in design, materials and construction than most similarly scaled private residences. The detached teacher's residence was located within the school grounds at a distance from the teaching buildings, usually with a separate, fenced yard with gardens and trees.

Plans for the residence at Maroon show a typical 1930s teacher's residence (Type D/R3). Built from 1929 to 1949, this type was a highset timber-framed structure, with a hipped roof with projecting gable at the front, and an L-shaped verandah to the northwest corner. The interior comprised a core of three bedrooms and a living room arranged around a central hallway, with a rear wing that included a kitchen with stove alcove, pantry and bathroom. French doors opened onto the verandah; and the six-light casement windows had skillion hoods on the north and east sides. The understorey was enclosed with timber battens and a laundry was located in the southeast corner. Corrugated metal water tanks on timber platforms were located on the south and east sides of the residence.

An important component of Queensland state schools was their grounds. The early and continuing commitment to play-based education, particularly in primary school, resulted in the provision of outdoor play space and sporting facilities, such as ovals and tennis courts. Also, trees and gardens were planted to shade and beautify schools. In the 1870s, schools inspector William Boyd was critical of tropical schools and amongst his recommendations stressed the importance of the adding shade trees to playgrounds. Subsequently, Arbor Day celebrations began in Queensland in 1890. Aesthetically designed gardens were encouraged by regional inspectors, and educators believed gardening and Arbor Days instilled in young minds the value of hard work and activity, improved classroom discipline, developed aesthetic tastes, and inspired people to stay on the land.

The grounds at Maroon State School contain a number of mature trees. The school had project clubs from 1912, which, amongst other horticultural and agricultural activities, planted fruit trees, a Cape chestnut tree (Calodendrum capense) and a pepperina tree (Schinus molle); plus Arbor day plantings over time have included silky oak (Grevillea robusta), camphor laurel (Cinnamomum camphora), silver wattle (Acacia dealbata), wych elm (Ulmus glabra), pine (Pinus sp.), jacaranda (Jacaranda sp.), and bauhinia (Bauhinia sp.) trees.

The school grounds also contain the Maroon War Memorial. Like all other Queensland communities, Maroon was affected by World War I, when 17 men of 42 enlisted from the district died. In September 1919 a committee (primarily the school committee) formed to raise funds for a war memorial wrote to the Department of Public Instruction asking permission to erect a memorial and honour stone, flagpole and avenue of trees in the school grounds. The memorial was unveiled by General Sir William Birdwood on 21 May 1920, and the school children planted flowers and shrubs in the memorial plot. Later, a plaque was added to the memorial, honouring the 35 men and 7 women who enlisted in World War II (2 men did not return).

The Maroon area is still agricultural and pastoral; so the school has experienced relatively little growth or change over the years. Aerial photographs in 1955 and 1970 confirm that the school consisted of the teacher's residence, playshed and small timber school building; with two earth closets (ECs) south of the latter, the Maroon War Memorial in the northeast corner of the school grounds, and a tennis court in the northwest corner.

In September 1958, part of the teaching building's verandah was reportedly enclosed for use as a library. Photographs taken in 1995 show the northern end of the east verandah enclosed with weatherboards, while the northern end of the west verandah was open at that time. Other modifications to the teaching building in recent years include the installation of air conditioning units, security screens to the inside of the banks of casement windows, the replacement and reconfiguration of the eastern timber stairs, and the enclosure of the northern half of the western verandah - first with security screens, and later with metal shutters. This resulted in the relocation of the school bell from the north end of the verandah to the western eave. The southern end of the west verandah (incorporating the former hat room) has been enclosed and lined internally. Modifications to the understorey include a kitchenette to the southeast corner and the enclosure of the north and east sides with aluminium-framed fly screens. There is a storage room in the southwest corner.

Some minor changes have also been made to the teacher's residence. By 1974 the western half of the corner verandah had been enclosed with weatherboard cladding and timber-framed casement windows on the north and west sides. A wall between the kitchen and bathroom passageway had also been removed. In 1991 the timber posts under the residence were replaced with concrete, and the concrete under the teaching building was also replaced at this time. Other alterations include: replacement of the timber battened enclosure and door to the laundry with flat sheeting and a boarded door; and the addition of several water tanks on timber platforms. In recent years, security mesh has been installed to the northern side of the verandah and to some of the windows.

The playshed was moved to its current location by 1961. To facilitate the move, the timber posts were severed at ground level and re-fixed into metal stirrups set into a concrete slab. The early timber seats have also been removed and the tops of the posts have been braced.

In the remainder of the grounds, the ECs were replaced with a toilet block c. 1977. A storage shed was built northeast of the residence c. 1988, and a covered play area existed east of this shed by 2006. More covered play areas, and covered walkways, have been added to the grounds since 2006, and in 2011 a new library building was erected. In 2015 this library is used as the teaching building, while the small timber school building is used as a library and administration offices. The Maroon War Memorial remains the focus of annual ANZAC Day commemorations.

=== War Memorial history ===
The Maroon War Memorial was constructed and unveiled in the grounds of the Maroon State School in 1920, to honour and memorialise the men from the Maroon district who had served in the armed forces during World War I (1914–1918).

At the outbreak of war in Europe in August 1914 Maroon was a small, isolated agricultural community without an urban focus, engaged principally in dairying. Forty-two men from the 35 families resident in the district enlisted and of these, 17 of whom died. This represented a mortality rate for the Maroon community of approximately 40%, compared with the average nationally of 20%.

Maroon was not alone in experiencing the devastating impact of this war. Australia-wide, over 300,000 volunteers from a national population of 4 million served overseas and one fifth, approximately 60,000, made the supreme sacrifice. Virtually every community in every state was affected in some fashion by the "war of attrition" in Europe and Asia Minor.

In the aftermath of the war, and in some instances prior to the cessation of hostilities, memorials honouring those who served in the war were erected in nearly every city, town and community in Australia. They were the expression of a grateful and grieving nation. Maroon was no exception. In 1919 a local committee (again chaired by Thomas de Montmorenci Murray-Prior and composed principally of the local Maroon school committee members) was formed to raise funds by public subscription for a memorial and honour stone to express the community's gratitude to the men from the district who had served during World War I. In September 1919 the committee requested permission from the Department of Public Instruction to erect a memorial, flagstaff and honour avenue of trees within the Maroon State School grounds.

The memorial committee commissioned the Ipswich firm of F Williams & Co., sculptors and stonemasons, to design, sculpt and construct the memorial. This firm was established at Ipswich in 1901. Its founder, Frank Williams, promoted the use of local marble and became noted for his ecclesiastical marblework in the Ipswich and Darling Downs areas. In the wake of World War I, Williams designed a significant number of war memorials in southeast Queensland, including "digger" statues at Ipswich's Western Suburbs (1917), Mount Alford (1918), Booval (1919), Bundamba (1919), Boonah (1920), Maroon (1920), Oxley (1920) and Toombul Shire (1921). Williams also designed the mausoleum and weeping mother statue at Gatton (c. 1922), obelisks at Toogoolawah (1917) and West Ipswich (1917) and a stone honour board at Colinton (1918).

The design for the Maroon War Memorial consisted of a "digger" statue atop a tall column, which in turn rested on a substantial pedestal and plinth. The whole was executed in sandstone, with Queensland marble inscription panels, and stood 17 feet 6 inches (5.33 m) in height. The cost of the monument (£130) plus foundations and extras, totalled £300. A surrounding timber fence was constructed by voluntary labour.

After the war General Sir William Birdwood, who had commanded the Australian Imperial Force during the war, toured many Australian and New Zealand communities, honouring both those who had made the supreme sacrifice and returned soldiers. During his tour General Birdwood unveiled the Maroon War Memorial on 21 May 1920 and presented Maroon Patriotic Committee medals to 14 of the district's returned servicemen.

At a later date a marble plaque was added to the memorial to honour the 42 men and women of the district who served during World War II.The Maroon War Memorial remains the focus for annual Anzac Day commemorations and maintenance of the memorial and enclosure is undertaken by local volunteers. Repairs are funded by an Anzac Day collection.

On 21 September 1991 a time capsule was placed at the base of the memorial to celebrate the centenary of the Maroon State School, 1891–1991.

== Description ==
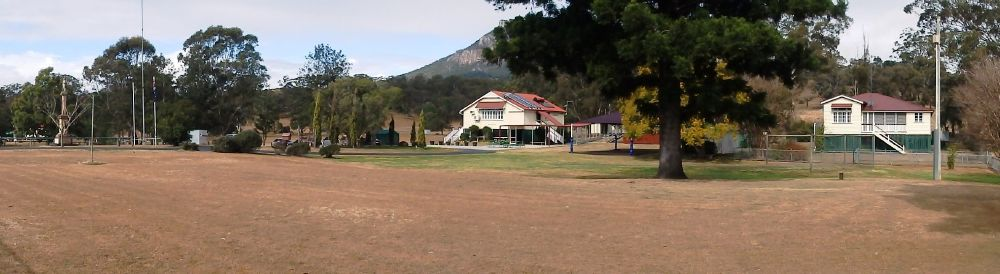
From left, War Memorial, 1938 teaching building and 1937 residence, from NW corner of grounds, 2015

Maroon State School occupies an approximately 0.8 hectares (2.0 acres) rectangular site in the rural locality of Maroon, southwest of Beaudesert and south of Boonah, near the border with New South Wales. Surrounded by paddocks at the foot of Mount Maroon, the site slopes gently down towards Boonah to Rathdowney Road, which forms the northern boundary. A War Memorial is situated in the northeast corner, adjacent to the entrance gate. The school buildings are set back from the road and orientated approximately north–south, with the Teacher's Residence (1937) located in a fenced yard in the southwest corner and the teaching building, a small timber school building (1938), to the east. The playshed (1910) stands to the southeast of the teaching building. The grounds contain open lawns and mature shade trees, and the teaching building is approached from the road via a sealed looped driveway.

Elements not of cultural significance include additions and alterations such as: modern extensions and enclosures; carpet and linoleum floor linings; sheeted partitions; ceiling fans and air conditioning units; modern joinery, fixtures and fittings; metal shutters and aluminium framed windows and screens.

=== Teacher's residence (1937) ===
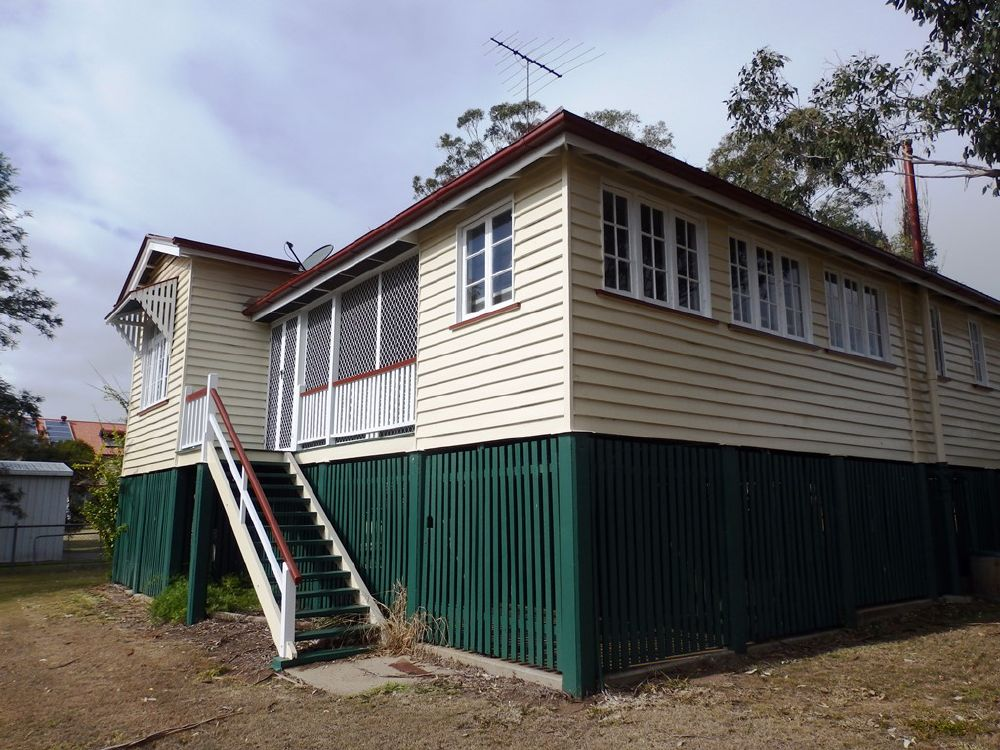
1937 Teacher's residence, from north-west, 2015

The teacher's residence is timber-framed, weatherboard-clad and highset on concrete stumps. The building has a hipped roof, with a projecting gable to the northeast corner and an enclosed L-shaped verandah to the northwest corner. Timber stairs provide access to the front verandah and an enclosed landing to the rear.

Early timber joinery is retained throughout the building including: casement windows with four-light fanlights and corrugated metal-clad hoods to the north, east and south elevations; a high-waisted panelled front door with glazed inserts and fanlight; and low-waisted French doors with four-light fanlights opening onto the front verandah. The enclosed verandah is weatherboard-clad with casement windows. A section of battened timber balustrade remains to the north. The verandah wall is single-skin with external post and belt rails supporting v-jointed (VJ) timber boards.

The interior layout comprises three bedrooms accessed via a central hallway at the front, with a living room, kitchen and bathroom to the rear. The kitchen retains its stove alcove. Interior walls and ceilings are lined with VJ timber boards, with simple-profile timber skirting and cornices.

The understorey has a concrete slab floor and is enclosed with timber battened screens. A laundry in the southeast corner is enclosed with flat sheeting and has a boarded door to the east. Early corrugated-metal water tanks on timber platforms, set on concrete stumps, are located to the east and south of the residence.

=== Small timber school building (1938) ===
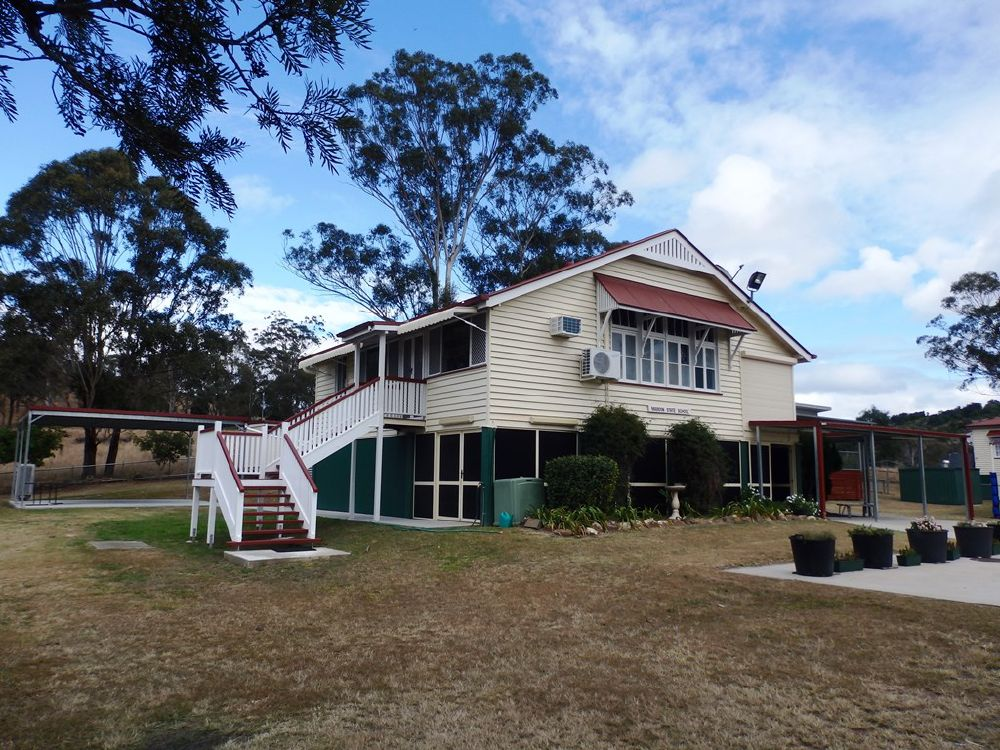
1938 teaching building from north-east, 2015

The teaching building is a highset, timber-framed and weatherboard-clad building. The roof is gabled, with timber batten infills, and is clad in corrugated metal sheeting. The north and south end walls each have large banks of casements with horizontal centre-pivoting fanlights, protected by hoods with battened timber brackets.

The walls and ceiling of the classroom are lined with VJ boards. The coved ceiling features an exposed metal tie rod and a latticed vent. The east and west facing verandahs have been enclosed (with weatherboard and aluminium framed windows) and are accessed by timber stairs. Both verandahs have raked ceilings lined with VJ boards and the verandah walls are single-skin with externally exposed studwork, except for the southern end of the west verandah, which is lined with flat sheeting. Doorways occupy their original positions in the verandah walls - slightly north of centre - and align with the modern external verandah doors. Most of the east verandah is used as office space, and the hat room enclosure at the south end of the verandah has been adapted for use as a store room. A modern partition divides the western verandah, with the hat room at the south end of the verandah converted to office space. An early school bell hangs by the western external door.

The understorey has a concrete slab floor and concrete stumps, some of which have been replaced with metal posts. The area is enclosed with corrugated-metal sheeting and modern aluminium-framed mesh screens. A storage room clad with vertical boards is located in the southwest corner.

=== Playshed (1910) ===
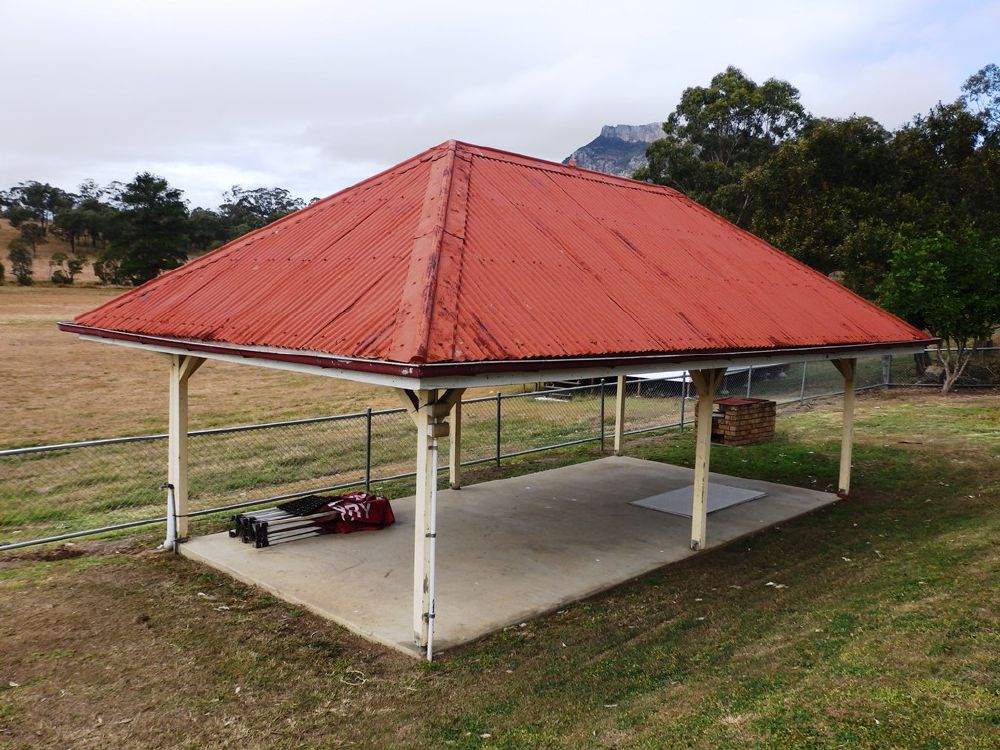
1910 playshed, from the north-west, 2015

The playshed is a small six-post timber structure with a hipped roof clad in corrugated metal sheeting. The posts are braced to the roof framing by brackets and the roof framing is exposed. Metal stirrups at the base of each post are set into a modern concrete slab. The posts retain evidence of where the original timber seat fixtures were located (now removed).

=== Grounds and views ===
The sloping site, open lawns, trees and gardens of the grounds form an attractive setting for the early school buildings.

A mature hoop pine (Araucaria cunninghamii) is located near the northwest corner of the site, south of the levelled lawn of the former tennis court. Another mature tree is located in the northwest corner of the grounds. Various plantings are located along the eastern boundary, and several mature gums (Eucalypt sp.) are positioned along the southern boundary, behind the 2011 building. A jacaranda (Jacaranda sp.) surrounded by timber bench seats is situated to the northeast corner of the fenced residence yard.

Positioned at the foot of Mt Maroon the school complex is prominent in its location and, combined with the War Memorial in the northeast corner, has picturesque qualities when viewed from Boonah to Rathdowney Road. Attractive views of the surrounding countryside and Mt Maroon are obtained from within the school grounds.

=== War Memorial ===
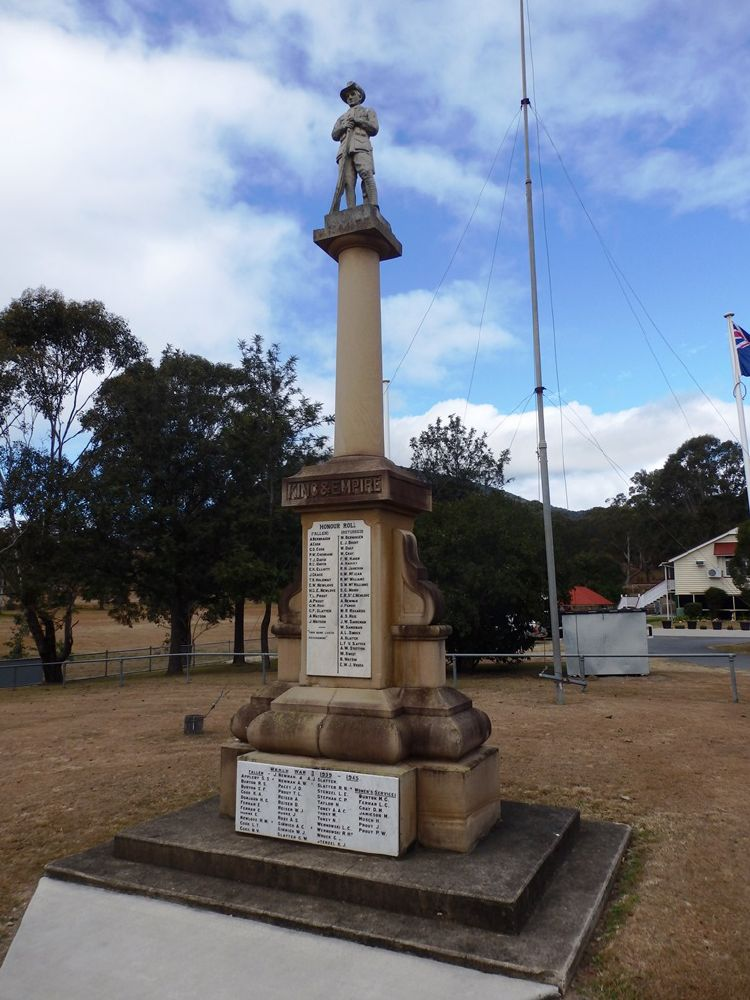
Maroon War Memorial from the north, 2015

The Maroon War Memorial is located within a small enclosure just inside the grounds of Maroon State School. The memorial is a tall structure consisting of a sandstone pedestal, column and "digger" statue, resting on a stepped concrete base.

The sandstone pedestal is substantial. It has a two-tiered lower section on which rests a narrower 4-sided shaft with decorative flanking scrolls. Tall leaded marble plaques are attached to the front (north) and back (south) faces of the shaft. The front plaque contains an honour roll bearing the names of the 42 local men who served in World War One. Beneath this, on the lowest tier of the pedestal, is another plaque bearing the names of the 42 local men and women who served in World War Two. The plaque on the back face of the shaft bears the inscription: 'This memorial was erected by the residents of Maroon as a tribute of gratitude and respect to the local volunteers in the Great War 1914–19.'

Attached to the lowest tier of the pedestal, on separate faces, are two small oblong marble plaques with the inscriptions: "Unveiled by General Sir William Birdwood, May 21, 1920" and "Time capsule placed 21-9-91 commemorating the Maroon State School centenary 1891-1991". With the exception of the latter, the other commemorative inscriptions are leaded.

The pedestal cornice bears raised lettering "King & Empire" on the front face. Above is a tall, plain column which in turn supports a half life-sized statue of an Australian infantry soldier or "digger", standing at ease in the distinctive pose used by sculptor Frank Williams for his "digger" statues. A carved tree stump immediately behind the left leg, often seen in such statues, was added to give the statue stability at the base.

Within the enclosure there is a concrete path leading toward the memorial and some tree plantings. Two small but mature trees, possibly Cupressus sp, flank the path and frame the approach to the memorial. Pines or Cypresses traditionally are associated with First World War memorials, symbolising the August 1915 battle of Lone Pine Ridge, one of the most savage in the Gallipoli campaign.

A tall metal flagstaff is located directly behind the memorial, within the enclosure. A perimeter fence of extruded galvanised iron pipe has replaced an earlier timber fence and is not of cultural heritage significance. Mt Maroon towers in the distance to the southeast and forms a dramatic visual background to the memorial.

=== Other buildings ===
Other buildings and structures on the site, including modern classroom and toilet blocks, shade structures and sheds, are not of cultural heritage significance.

== Heritage listing ==
Maroon State School and Maroon War Memorial was listed on the Queensland Heritage Register on 9 October 2015 having satisfied the following criteria.

The place is important in demonstrating the evolution or pattern of Queensland's history.

Maroon State School (established in 1891 as a provisional school) is important in demonstrating the evolution of state education and its associated architecture in Queensland. The place retains a collection of good representative examples of standard government designs that were architectural responses to prevailing government educational philosophies.

These standard Department of Public Works-designed buildings include: a teacher's residence (1937), which is evidence of the Departmental policy of providing residences for married male head teachers in rural areas, as an inducement and to provide a resident caretaker on the site; and a small timber school building (1938), demonstrating the evolution of timber school buildings in providing adequate lighting and ventilation, and the provision of small teaching buildings in regional Queensland.

The playshed (1910), and large grounds with mature trees, demonstrates the Queensland education system's recognition of the importance of play and aesthetics in the education of children.

The Maroon War Memorial (1920), located at the front of the school, is important in demonstrating the school community's involvement in a major world event, and its size and presence in the landscape is a reflection of the magnitude of the loss suffered by the district. War memorials are a tribute to those who served, and those who died, from a particular community. They are an important element of Queensland's towns and cities and are also important in demonstrating a common pattern of commemoration across Queensland and Australia. The Maroon War Memorial also exemplifies the work of Ipswich stonemason and sculptor, Frank Williams, who designed and constructed a significant number of southeast Queensland World War I memorials.

The place is important in demonstrating the principal characteristics of a particular class of cultural places.

Maroon State School is important in demonstrating the principal characteristics of Queensland state schools with their later modifications. These include: timber-framed buildings constructed to standard designs by the Queensland Government; and generous, landscaped sites with mature shade trees and play areas. The school is a good example of a modest, regional school complex.

The teacher's residence is an intact example of the residence type of the interwar period, retaining its highset character, hipped roof with projecting gable, weatherboard-clad form, three bedrooms and early joinery.

The teaching building is a good example of an interwar small timber school building and is important in demonstrating the principal characteristics of its type. It retains its gable roof; early timber joinery; single large classroom; generous verandahs (now enclosed) with hat rooms; coved ceiling with latticed vent and tie rod; VJ board linings; and single skin verandah walls. An early school bell hangs from the eaves of the western verandah.

The playshed is a good example of its type and retains its hipped timber-framed roof, supported on six braced timber posts.

The Maroon War Memorial is important in demonstrating the principal characteristics of its class of cultural places, being a substantial and highly intact commemorative structure erected as an enduring record of a major historical event. This is achieved through the use of appropriate materials and design elements.

The place is important because of its aesthetic significance.

Maroon State School is of aesthetic significance for its setting. Set against the backdrop of Mt Maroon and surrounded by open pastoral land, the complex of timber-framed school buildings with generous grounds and mature trees, combined with the War Memorial, provides a contrast between natural and built elements in a rural setting.

The place has a strong or special association with a particular community or cultural group for social, cultural or spiritual reasons.

Schools have always played an important part in Queensland communities. They typically retain significant and enduring connections with former pupils, parents, and teachers; provide a venue for social interaction and volunteer work; and are a source of pride, symbolising local progress and aspirations. Maroon State School has a strong and ongoing association with the Maroon community. It was established in 1891 through the fundraising efforts of the community and generations of local children have been taught there. The place is important for its contribution to the educational development of Maroon and district and is a prominent community focal point and gathering place for social and commemorative events with widespread community support.

The Maroon War Memorial is of social and spiritual significance for the local community, having a strong and continuing association with that community as evidence of the impact of a major historical event and as the focus for annual remembrance of that event in local Anzac Day commemorative ceremonies.
