= Wallaces Creek, Queensland =

Wallaces Creek
- Suburb
- Interactive map of Wallaces Creek
- Coordinates: 28.0658°S 152.6566°E
- Country: Australia
- State: Queensland
- LGA: Scenic Rim Region
- Location: 9.2 km (5.7 mi) SW of Boonah; 48.7 km (30.3 mi) WSW of Beaudesert; 57.6 km (35.8 mi) SSW of Ipswich; 96.7 km (60.1 mi) SW of Brisbane CBD

Government
  - State electorate: Scenic Rim
  - Federal division: Wright

Area
  - Total: 12.1 km^{2} (4.7 sq mi)

Population
  - Total: 74 (2021 census)
  - Density: 6.12/km^{2} (15.84/sq mi)
- Time zone: UTC+10:00 (AEST)
Suburbs around Wallaces Creek
Bunjurgen	Dugandan	Bunburra
Mount Alford	Wallaces Creek	Bunburra
Coochin	Coochin	Coochin

Wallaces Creek is a rural locality in the Scenic Rim Region, Queensland, Australia. In the 2021 census, Wallaces Creek had a population of 74 people.

== Geography ==
Wallace Creek (the watercourse) rises in the south of the locality and flows through to the north.

The Boonah – Rathdowney Road (State Route 93) runs through from north to south.

There is a quarry at 851 Boonah Rathdowney Road (28.0598°S 152.6533°E). Apart from the quarry, the land use is almost entirely grazing on native vegetation.

== Demographics ==
In the 2016 census, Wallaces Creek had a population of 58 people. The locality contained 24 households, in which 46.4% of the population were males and 53.6% of the population were females, with a median age of 49, 11 years above the national average. The average weekly household income was $1,562, $124 above the national average.

In the 2021 census, Wallaces Creek had a population of 74 people.

== Education ==
There are no schools in Wallaces Creek. The nearest government primary schools are Mount Alford State School in neighbouring Mount Alford to the west and Boonah State School in Boonah to the north-east. The nearest government secondary school is Boonah State High School in Boonah to the north-east.
