= Kooralbyn International School =

The Kooralbyn International School

Location
- Kooralbyn, Queensland; Australia; 28.0942°S 152.8431°E

Information
- Type: P–12 (co-educational)
- Motto: Latin: Absol Fiducia (Believe in yourself)
- Denomination: Non-denominational
- Established: 1985 (original)
- Staff: 34 teachers
- Enrollment: 285 (2017)
- Colours: Maroon, grey, white
- Website: http://www.tkis.qld.edu.au

The Kooralbyn International School (TKIS) is an independent, co-educational, boarding and day school, located in Kooralbyn, an area within the Gold Coast hinterland about 64 km south of Brisbane, Queensland, Australia. TKIS is the only school in Australia to have produced two Young Australian of the Year recipients (Cathy Freeman and Scott Hocknull).

== History ==
The school was founded in 1985, at a site on the banks of Cannon Creek now known as the 'Lower campus'. However, in the mid-1990s, it was largely relocated to a nearby hillside after flooding incidents in 1990 and 1991 caused extensive damage to the school. A wooden pillar from one of the school's original buildings still stands on the grounds, as a monument to these events.

The original TKIS closed in 2002 due to funding issues. In 2004 TKIS was re-opened with a new Board, Principal (Geoff Mills), new staff and new financial backing.

Former school principal of the original school Bryan Andrew and other senior staff members are also responsible for the creation of the Spring Hill-based company 'International Education Services' (IES). This company has, since 1998 successfully run the University of Queensland's Foundation Year program in Spring Hill.

== Notable alumni ==
- Steven Bowditch, golfer, class of 2000
- Andrew Buckle, golfer, class of 1999
- Jason Day, golfer, class of 2002
- Cathy Freeman OAM, athlete, class of 1990
- Scott Hocknull, palaeontologist, class of 1994
- Adam Scott, golfer, class of 1997
- Lev Susany, powerlifter and Commonwealth record holder, class of 1996

== See also ==
- List of schools in Queensland
