= Cannon Creek, Queensland (Scenic Rim Region) =

Rural locality in Queensland, Australia

Cannon Creek
- Suburb
- Interactive map of Cannon Creek
- Coordinates: 28.0777°S 152.7344°E
- Country: Australia
- State: Queensland
- LGA: Scenic Rim Region
- Location: 13.2 km (8.2 mi) S of Boonah; 49.5 km (30.8 mi) WSW of Beaudesert; 56.8 km (35.3 mi) S of Ipswich; 95.7 km (59.5 mi) SW of Brisbane

Government
  - State electorate: Scenic Rim
  - Federal division: Wright

Area
  - Total: 45.5 km^{2} (17.6 sq mi)

Population
  - Total: 75 (2021 census)
  - Density: 1.648/km^{2} (4.27/sq mi)
- Time zone: UTC+10:00 (AEST)
- Postcode: 4310
Suburbs around Cannon Creek
Milford	Allandale	Allandale
Bunburra	Cannon Creek	Kooralbyn
Coochin	Maroon	Knapp Creek

Cannon Creek is a rural locality in the Scenic Rim Region, Queensland, Australia. In the 2021 census, Cannon Creek had a population of 75 people.

== History ==
St John's Anglican Church was dedicated on 18 November 1911 by Venerable Henry Le Fanu, the Archdeacon of Toowoomba. It was beside Cannon Creek and was 25 by 14 feet (7.6 by 4.3 m), capable of seating 35 people (there were six or seven Anglican families in the district). The chancel was 9 by 7 feet (2.7 by 2.1 m). The land was donated by John Saville and other local people donated building materials and volunteered their labour. The church was at 691 Cannon Creek Road (28.0783°S 152.7318°E). It closed circa 1952. In 1976, the church was relocated to the Templin Historical Village.

Cannon Vale State School opened on 19 March 1917. It closed in 1956. The school was on Cannon Creek Road (approx 28.0708°S 152.7279°E).

Cannon Creek was in Shire of Boonah until it was amalgamated into Scenic Rim Region in 2008.

== Demographics ==
In the 2016 census, Cannon Creek had a population of 78 people. The locality contained 39 households, in which 47.4% of the population were males and 52.6% of the population were females with a median age of 51, 13 years above the national average. The average weekly household income was $1,562, $124 above the national average.

In the 2021 census, Cannon Creek had a population of 75 people.

== Education ==
There are no schools in the locality. The nearest government primary schools are Boonah State School in Boonah to the north and Maroon State School in neighbouring Maroon to the south. The nearest government secondary school is Boonah State High School in Boonah.
