= Bunjurgen, Queensland =

Bunjurgen
- Suburb
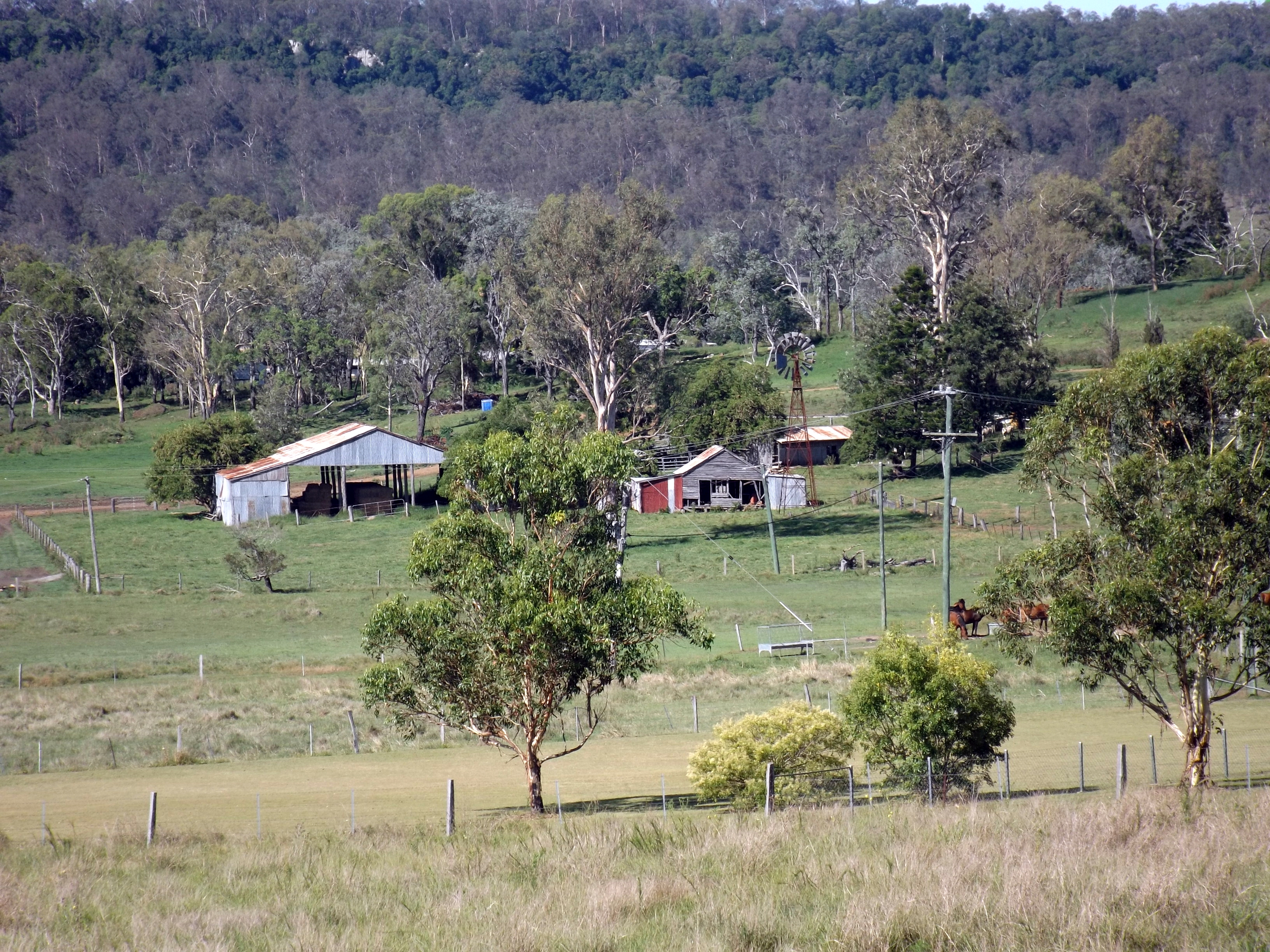
- Farm buildings at Bunjurgen, 2016

- Interactive map of Bunjurgen
- Coordinates: 28.0397°S 152.6172°E
- Country: Australia
- State: Queensland
- LGA: Scenic Rim Region
- Location: 8.5 km (5.3 mi) SW of Boonah; 48.0 km (29.8 mi) WSW of Beaudesert; 56.9 km (35.4 mi) SSW of Ipswich CBD; 97.6 km (60.6 mi) SW of Brisbane CBD

Government
  - State electorate: Scenic Rim
  - Federal division: Wright

Area
  - Total: 16.5 km^{2} (6.4 sq mi)

Population
  - Total: 107 (2021 census)
  - Density: 6.48/km^{2} (16.80/sq mi)
- Time zone: UTC+10:00 (AEST)
- Postcode: 4310
Suburbs around Bunjurgen
Charlwood	Mount French	Frenches Creek
Mount Alford	Bunjurgen	Dugandan
Mount Alford	Mount Alford	Wallaces Creek

Bunjurgen is a rural locality in the Scenic Rim Region, Queensland, Australia. In the 2021 census, Bunjurgen had a population of 107 people.

== Geography ==
Teviot Brook flows into the locality from the south-west (Mount Alford) and exits to the east (Frenches Creek / Dugandan).

The land use is a mixing of cropping (mostly around Teviot Brook) and grazing on native vegetation.

== History ==
Mount French Provisional School opened on 26 September 1887. In 1901, it was renamed Coochin Lower Provisional School. On 1 January 1909, it became Coochin Lower State School. On 29 April 1926, it was renamed Bunjurgen State School. It closed on 11 April 1968. It was on Mount Alford Road (approx 28.0412°S 152.6220°E). (It should not be confused with another Mount French State School which opened in 1900.)

== Demographics ==
In the 2016 census, Bunjurgen had a population of 116 people. The locality contained 56 households, in which 51.3% of the population were males and 48.7% of the population were females with a median age of 49, 11 years above the national average. The average weekly household income was $1,463, $25 above the national average. None of Bunjurgen's population was either of Aborigional or Torres Strait Islander descent. 77.1% of the population aged 15 or over were either registered or de facto married, while 22.9% of the population were not married. 24.3% of the population were attending some form education. The most common nominated ancestries were English (39.3%), Australian (26.0%) and Irish (14.0%), while the most common countries of birth are Australia (87.9%), New Zealand (7.1%) and England (2.7%), and the most commonly spoken language at home was English (96.4%). The most common nominated religions were Anglican (24.1%), No religion (20.7%) and Catholic (19.0%). The most common occupation was a tie between a cleric/administration worker and a machinery operator/driver (16.9%) the majority/plurality of residents worked 40 or more hours per week (49.1%).

In the 2021 census, Bunjurgen had a population of 107 people.

== Education ==
There are no schools in Bunjurgen. The nearest government primary school is Mount Alford State School in neighbouring Mount Alford to the south-west. The nearest government secondary school is Boonah State High School in Boonah to the north-east.

== Attractions ==
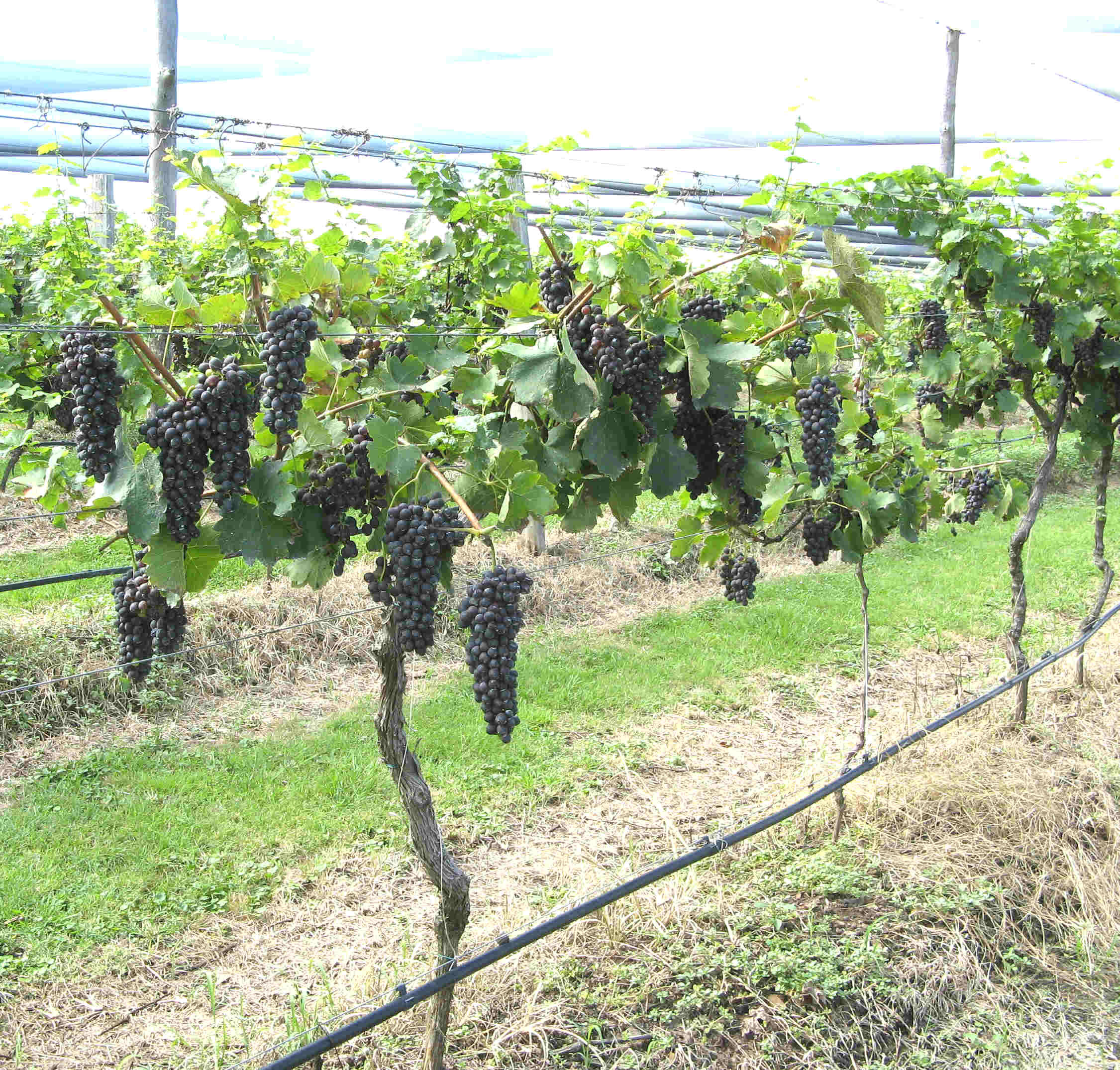
Grapes growing, Bunjurgen Estate Vineyard and Winery, 2009

Bunjurgen Estate Vineyard and Winery is a 60-acre (24 ha) property at 121 Brent Road. Tastings and purchases are available at the cellar door. There is a picnic area.
