= Coochin, Queensland =

Coochin
- Suburb
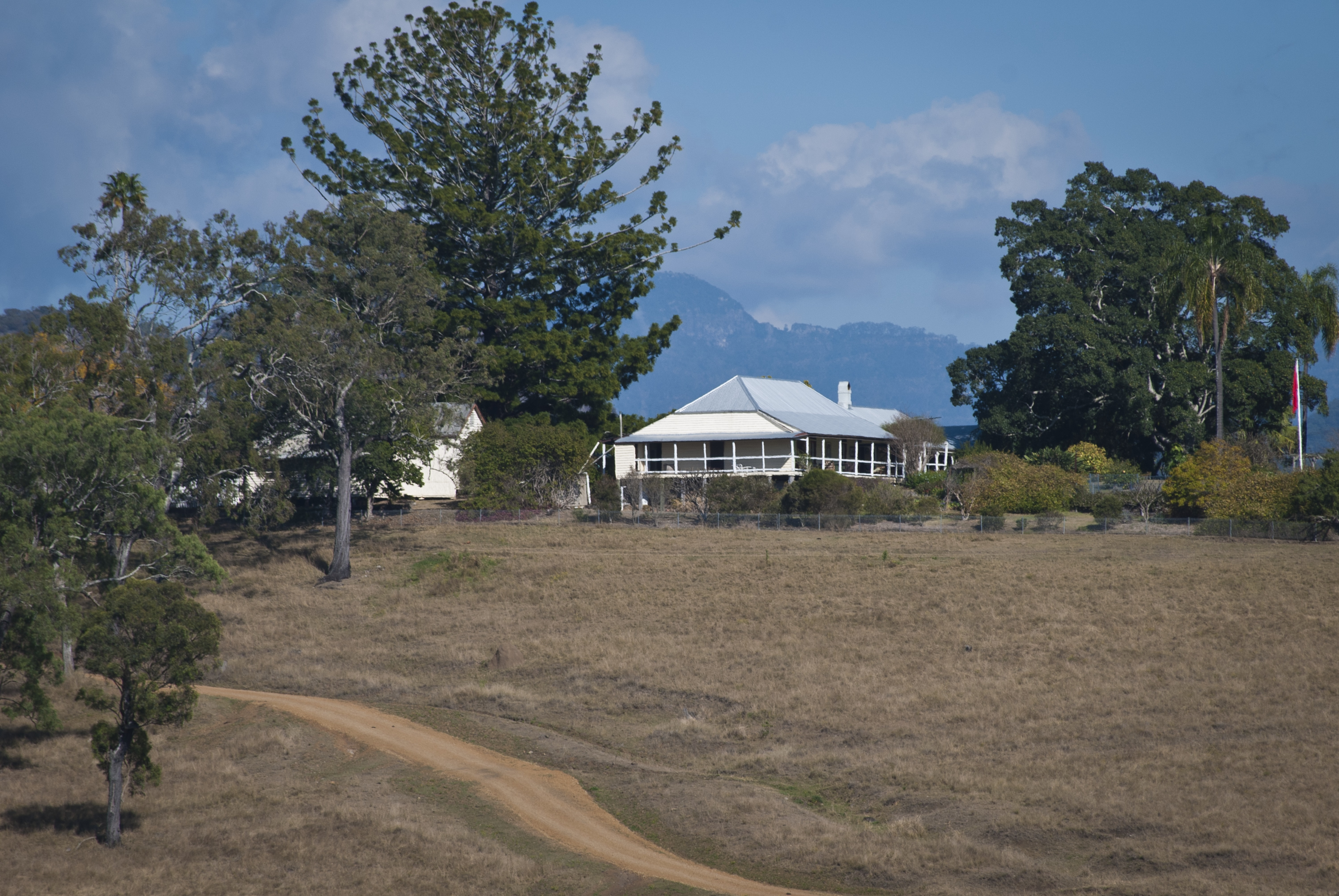
- Coochin Coochin homestead at Coochin, 2013

- Interactive map of Coochin
- Coordinates: 28.1216°S 152.6472°E
- Country: Australia
- State: Queensland
- LGA: Scenic Rim Region
- Location: 12.7 km (7.9 mi) SSW of Boonah; 52.1 km (32.4 mi) SW of Beaudesert; 100 km (62 mi) SSW of Brisbane

Government
  - State electorate: Scenic Rim
  - Federal division: Wright

Area
  - Total: 44.3 km^{2} (17.1 sq mi)

Population
  - Total: 115 (2021 census)
  - Density: 2.596/km^{2} (6.72/sq mi)
- Time zone: UTC+10:00 (AEST)
- Postcode: 4310
Suburbs around Coochin
Mount Alford	Wallaces Creek	Bunburra
Mount Alford	Coochin	Cannon Creek
Croftby	Maroon	Maroon

Coochin is a rural locality in the Scenic Rim Region, Queensland, Australia. In the 2021 census, Coochin had a population of 115 people.

== History ==
In 1877, 8,500 acres (3,400 ha) were resumed from the Coochin Coochin pastoral run and offered for selection on 19 April 1877.

== Demographics ==
In the 2016 census, Coochin had a population of 96 people. The locality contained 54 households, in which 50.5% of the population were males and 49.5% were females, with a median age of 51, 13 years above the national average. The average weekly household income was $1,021, $417 below the national average.

In the 2021 census, Coochin had a population of 115 people.

== Heritage listings ==
Coochin has a number of heritage listings, including:

- Coochin Coochin Homestead, J Bell Road (28.1066°S 152.6303°E)

== Education ==
There are no schools in Coochin. The nearest government primary schools are Mount Alford State School in neighbouring Mount Alford to the north-west and Maroon State School in neighbouring Maroon to the south-east. The nearest government secondary school is Boonah State High School in Boonah to the north-east.
