= Kooralbyn, Queensland =

Kooralbyn
- Suburb
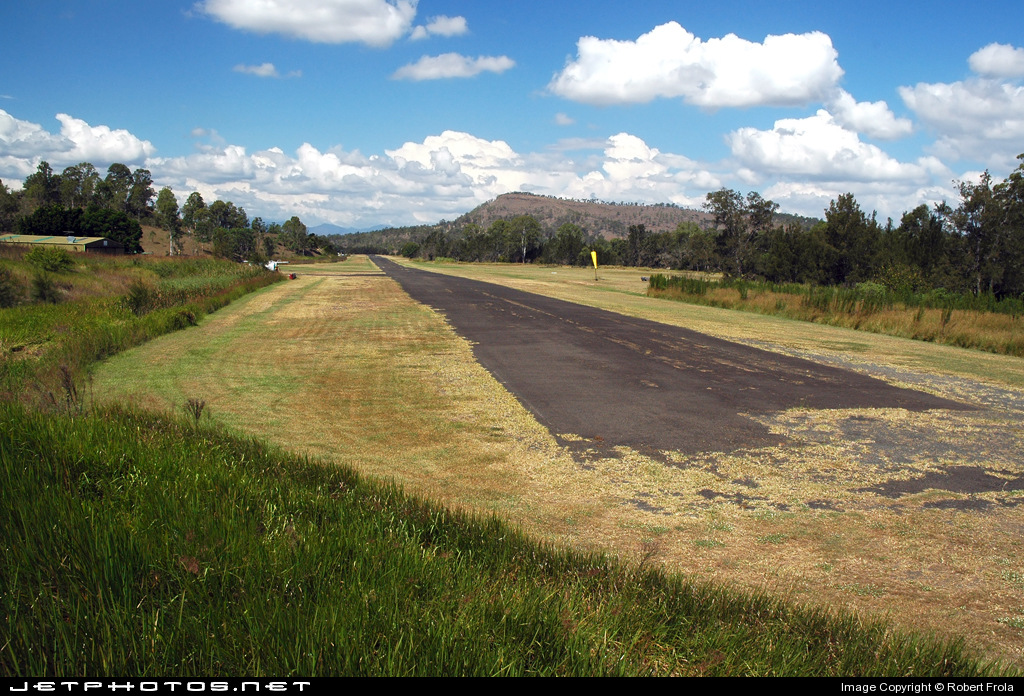
- Kooralbyn Airstrip runway, 2011

- Interactive map of Kooralbyn
- Coordinates: 28.0725°S 152.8208°E
- Country: Australia
- State: Queensland
- LGA: Scenic Rim Region
- Location: 27.0 km (16.8 mi) SW of Beaudesert; 95.6 km (59.4 mi) SSW of Brisbane CBD
- Established: 1830s

Government
  - State electorate: Scenic Rim
  - Federal division: Wright

Area
  - Total: 87.4 km^{2} (33.7 sq mi)

Population
  - Total: 1,697 (2021 census)
  - Density: 19.416/km^{2} (50.29/sq mi)
- Time zone: UTC+10:00 (AEST)
- Postcode: 4285
Suburbs around Kooralbyn
Allandale	Bromelton	Josephville
Cannon Creek	Kooralbyn	Laravale
Cannon Creek	Knapp Creek	Knapp Creek

Kooralbyn is a rural locality in the Scenic Rim Region, Queensland, Australia. In the 2021 census, Kooralbyn had a population of 1,697 people.

== Geography ==
Kooralbyn has the following mountains:

- Mount Kooralbyn (28.1036°S 152.8603°E) 281 metres (922 ft)
- Mount Tilley (28.0503°S 152.8901°E) 351 metres (1,152 ft)

The land use is predominantly grazing on native vegetation with the residential land and golf course in the south-east of the locality.

== History ==
Kooralbyn is a Yugambeh word meaning the place of the copperhead snake.

John "Tinker" Campbell established the Kooralbyn pastoral station in the 1840s.

Kooralbyn International School opened on 30 January 1985. The school suffered a number of problems including major flooding, rebuilding, and economic impacts over the years, resulting in some periods of closure. However, the school community was determined to succeed and overcame these obstacles.

== Demographics ==
Kooralbyn has a population of 1725 people at the 2016 census. The locality contained 820 households, in which 49.9% of the population were male and 50.1% of the population were female with a median age of 46, 8 years above the national average. The average weekly household income was $844, $594 below the national average. 5.2% of Kooralbyn's population were either of Aborigional or Torres Strait Islander descent. 60.1% of the population aged 15 or over were either registered or de facto married, while 39.9% of the population were not married. 27.7% of the population were attending some form of a compulsory education. The most common nominated ancestries were English (32.5%), Australian (28.2%) and Irish (9.0%), while the most common country of birth was Australia (71.7%), and the most commonly spoken language at home was English (89.4%). The most common nominated religions were No religion (32.2%), Anglican (22.8%) and Catholic (16.2%). The most common occupation was a technician/trades worker (18.1%) and the majority/plurality of residents worked 40 or more hours per week (43.0%).

In the 2021 census, Kooralbyn had a population of 1,697 people.

== Education ==
The Kooralbyn International School is a private primary and secondary (Prep-12) school for boys and girls at 62-80 Ogilvie Place (28.0939°S 152.8447°E). In 2017, the school had an enrolment of 285 students with 24 teachers (21 full-time equivalent) and 24 non-teaching staff (16 full-time equivalent).

There are no government schools in Kooralbyn. The nearest government primary schools are Tamrookum State School in Tamrookum and Boonah State School in Boonah. The nearest government secondary schools are Boonah State High School in Boonah and Beaudesert State High School in Beaudesert.

== Amenities ==
The Scenic Rim Regional Council operates a mobile library service which visits Salisbury Avenue.

The Scenic Rim Aerodrome (ICAO:YSRA) is in the south-east of the locality on Wellington Bundock Drive (28.0884°S 152.8448°E). It is privately owned and was formerly known as Kooralbyn Aerodrome.

== Resort ==
In 1979, work began on a resort that featured a diverse range of recreational facilities. 55 hillside holiday houses were completed in 1982 and designed by Harry Seidler. In 1991 a new hotel was added to the resort. In July 2008 the resort and golf course closed and went into liquidation. In June 2014 Peter Huang, founder of the Yong Real Estate group, settled on the purchase of the Kooralbyn Resort.

After a lengthy restoration costing over $7m, the newly-renamed Ramada Resort Kooralbyn Valley re-opened to visitors in June 2016.
