= Bromelton railway station =

Former railway station in Queensland, Australia

Bromelton

General information
- Location: Boonah-Beaudesert Road, Bromelton
- Coordinates: 27°58′14″S 152°55′34″E
- Owner: Queensland Rail
- Operator: NSW TrainLink
- Line: North Coast
- Distance: 931.70 kilometres from Central
- Platforms: 1
- Tracks: 1

Construction
- Structure type: Ground

History
- Opened: 1930
- Closed: 1994
Location

Bromelton railway station was a former station on the NSW North Coast line in Queensland, Australia. It served the rural locality of Bromelton.

== Platforms and services ==
Bromelton was served by a northbound XPT service to Roma Street and a southbound service to Sydney. However, these services ceased operation in 1994, leading to the station's closure.
