= Milford, Queensland =

Milford
- Suburb
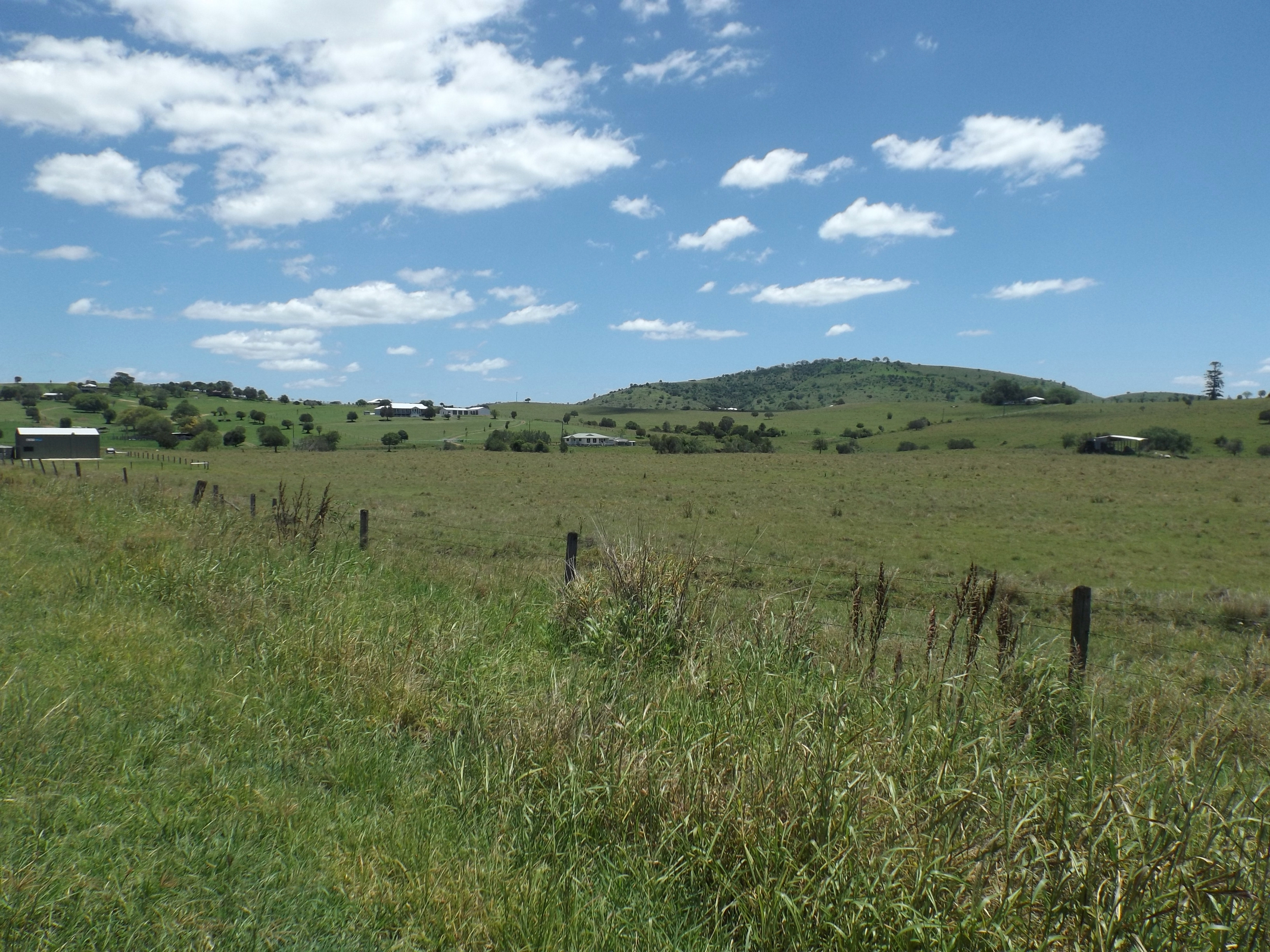
- Fields, 2016

- Interactive map of Milford
- Coordinates: 28.0313°S 152.7075°E
- Country: Australia
- State: Queensland
- LGA: Scenic Rim Region
- Location: 5.6 km (3.5 mi) SE of Boonah; 41.8 km (26.0 mi) W of Beaudesert; 50.8 km (31.6 mi) S of Ipswich; 99.6 km (61.9 mi) SW of Brisbane CBD

Government
  - State electorate: Scenic Rim
  - Federal division: Wright

Area
  - Total: 18.3 km^{2} (7.1 sq mi)

Population
  - Total: 190 (2021 census)
  - Density: 10.38/km^{2} (26.9/sq mi)
- Time zone: UTC+10:00 (AEST)
- Postcode: 4310
Suburbs around Milford
| Dugandan | Allandale | Allandale |
| Dugandan | Milford | Cannon Creek |
| Bunburra | Bunburra | Cannon Creek |

Milford is a rural locality in the Scenic Rim Region, Queensland, Australia. In the 2021 census, Milford had a population of 190 people.

== Geography ==
Rural residential properties predominate in mostly open fields and hilly paddocks with no major roads or geographical features.

== History ==
The locality takes its name from a local farm, which in turn was named by a selector Andrew Mahaffey circa 1877.

A Primitive Methodist church opened in Milford on Tuesday 10 December 1889. After the amalgamation of the Methodist Church of Australasia into the Uniting Church in Australia in 1977, it became Milford Uniting Church. It was sold in 2000 and was used a weekender before becoming a bed-and-breakfast in 2007. It is at 438 Milford Road (28.0260°S 152.7112°E).

Milford Provisional School opened on 12 April 1886. On 6 July 1900, it was officially opened by Mr J Haygarth of Boonah as the new Milford State School. It closed on 14 December 1984. It was located at 382 Milford Road (28.0250°S 152.7054°E) and is now used as a private home.

== Demographics ==
In the 2016 census, Milford had a population of 207. The locality contained 93 households, in which 50.5% of the population were males and 49.5% of the population were females with a median age of 46, 8 years above the national average. The average weekly household income was $1,375, $63 below the national average. 1.5% of Milford's population is either of Aborigional or Torres Strait Islander descent. 73.5% of the population aged 15 or over was either registered or de facto married, while 26.5% of the population was not married. 37.4% of the population was attending some form of education. The most common nominated ancestries were Australian (32.7%), English (27.4%) and German (16.0%), while the most common country of birth was Australia (84.2%), and the most commonly spoken language at home was English (88.8%). The most common nominated religions were Catholic (28.1%), Anglican (19.8%) and the Uniting Church (16.7%). The most common occupation was a sales worker (18.3%) and the majority/plurality of residents worked 40 or more hours per week (40.6%).

In the 2021 census, Milford had a population of 190 people.

== Education ==
There are no schools in Milford. The nearest government primary and secondary schools are Boonah State School and Boonah State High School, both in neighbouring Boonah to the north-west.
