= Dugandan, Queensland =

Dugandan
- Town
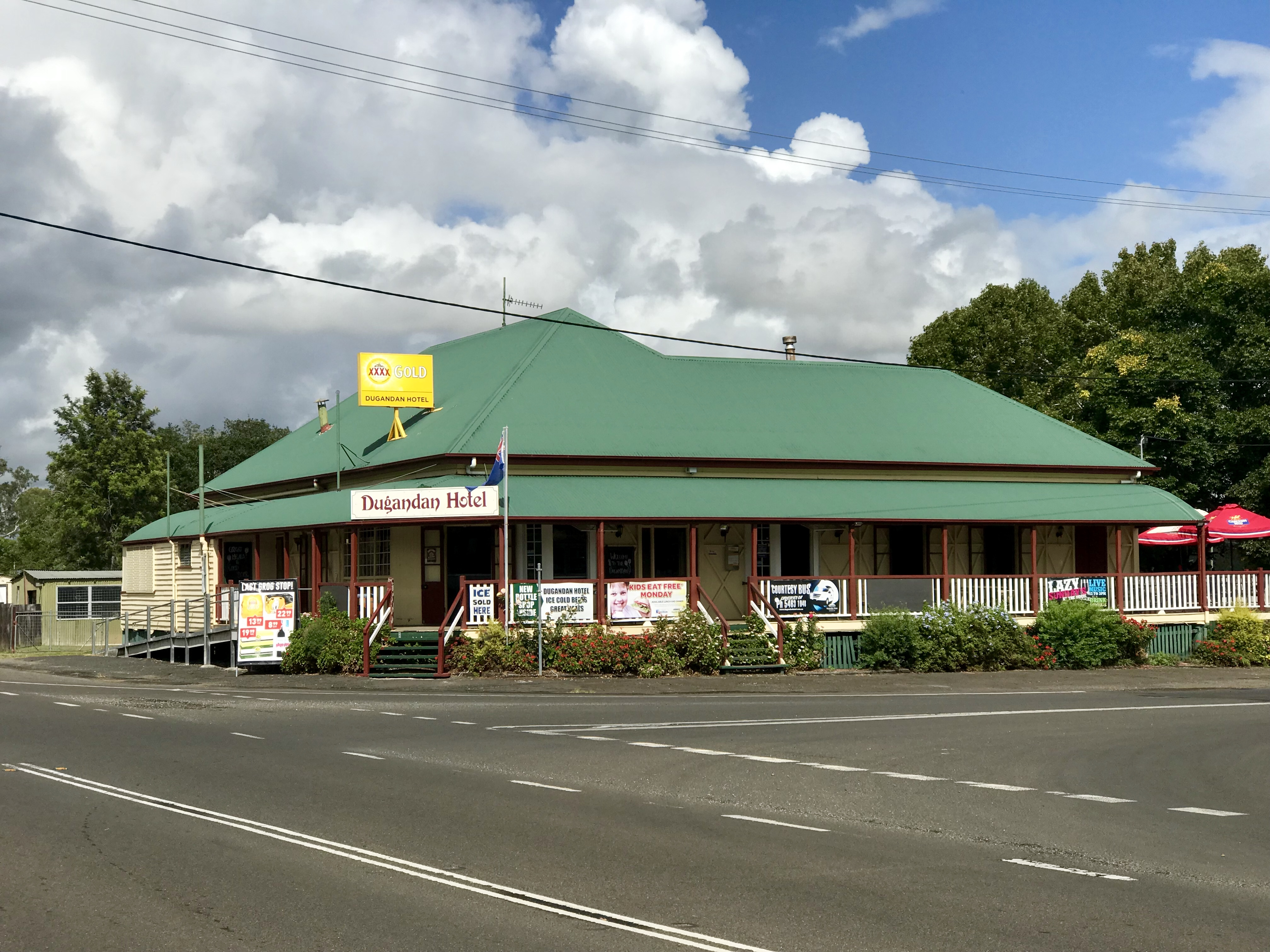
- Dugandan Hotel, 2018

- Interactive map of Dugandan
- Coordinates: 28.0100°S 152.6813°E
- Country: Australia
- State: Queensland
- City: Boonah
- LGA: Scenic Rim Region
- Location: 5.1 km (3.2 mi) S of Boonah; 44.2 km (27.5 mi) W of Beaudesert; 51.5 km (32.0 mi) S of Ipswich; 91.3 km (56.7 mi) SW of Brisbane CBD

Government
  - State electorate: Scenic Rim
  - Federal division: Wright

Area
  - Total: 14.5 km^{2} (5.6 sq mi)

Population
  - Total: 602 (2021 census)
  - Density: 41.52/km^{2} (107.5/sq mi)
- Time zone: UTC+10:00 (AEST)
- Postcode: 4310
Localities around Dugandan
Mount French	Boonah	Allandale
Frenches Creek	Dugandan	Milford
Bunjurgen	Wallaces Creek	Bunburra

Dugandan (pronounced Doog-an-dan) is a rural town and locality in the Scenic Rim Region, Queensland, Australia. In the 2021 census, the locality of Dugandan had a population of 602 people.

== Geography ==
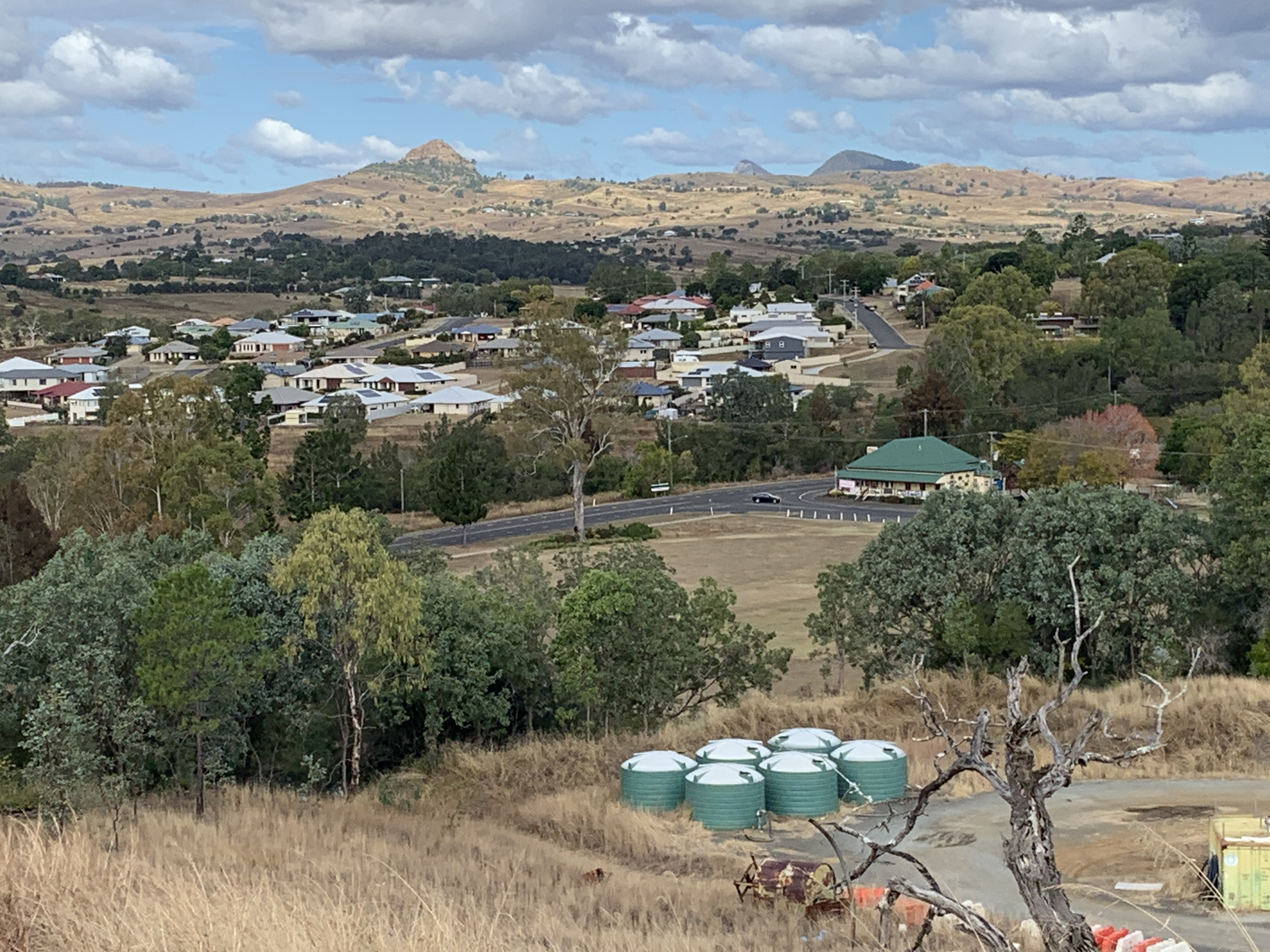
View over Dugandan, hotel is centre right, 2020

Teviot Brook forms part of the western boundary before flowing through to the north.

The Boonah – Rathdowney Road (State Route 93) runs through from north to south.

== History ==
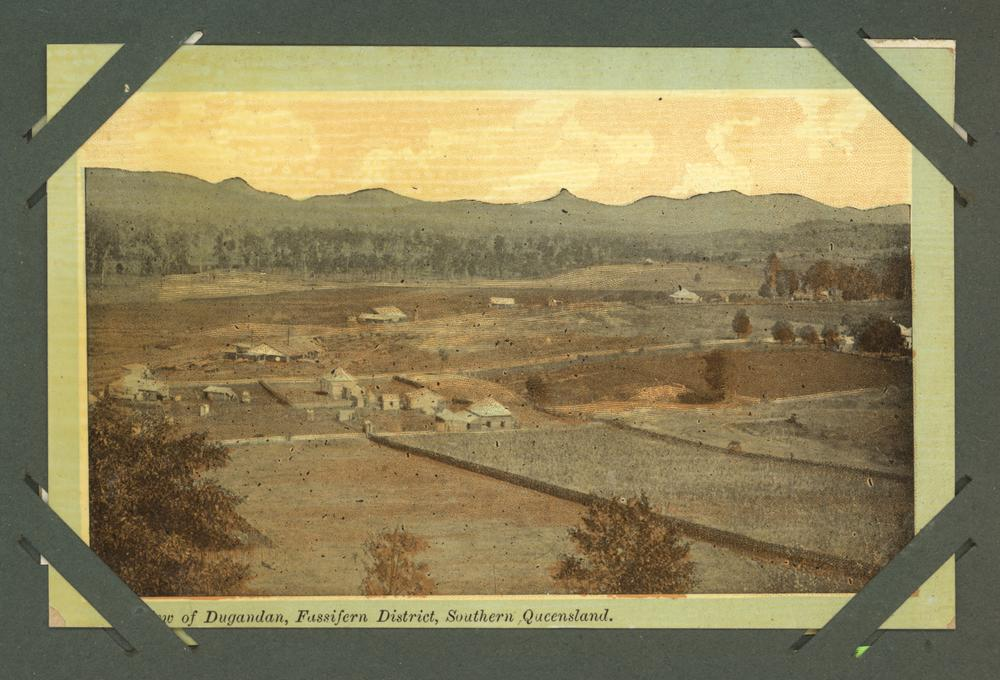
Town of Dugandan, circa 1907

The name Dugandan is believed to be a Ugarapul word dugai/tugai meaning mountain spur place. Originally the name was used for a large pastoral run established in 1884, covering a much larger area than the current locality from Boonah to Mount Joyce. As a result, the name Dugandan was used for the present day town of Boonah until the 1880s when it acquired its present name.

In January 1861, a native police detachment led by Lieutenant Frederick Walker was dispatched to Dugandan Scrub, to the south of the present town, to "disperse" the local aboriginals who were camped in the area. This was in response to a request from the settler John Hardie. When the native police ambushed their camp during the night, at least two were killed, with possibly as many as 40 being killed.

The Dugandan Provisional School which opened in 1878 was located in (present day) Boonah. This school was renamed Boonah State School in 1895.

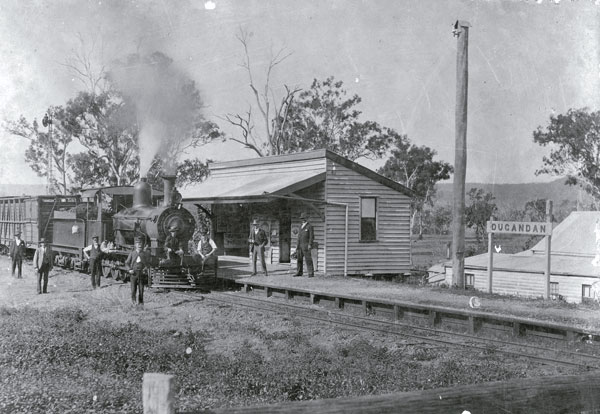
Dugandan railway station, circa 1930

In 1886 Carl Stumer erected the Dugandan General Store. It was raised following flooding in 1887. In 1913 it was renovated and became the Dugandan Hotel. There was an earlier hotel in Boonah called the Dugandan Hotel but it was not operating in 1913.

The Fassifern railway line (Queensland's first branch railway line) was extended from Harrisville to Dugandah and opened on 12 September 1887 with the town being served by Dugandan railway station (28.0042°S 152.6768°E). (The line originally opened from Ipswich to Harrisville on 10 July 1882.) The line closed in June 1964.

By 1887, a sawmill was already established in Dugandan under the combined partnership of Josias Hancock and James Cossart. The mill burned down in 1897. Cossart's Mill became one of the major employers in the region and contributed significantly to the prosperity of Boonah and Dugandan into the twentieth century. It was located at (28.0056°S 152.6753°E) to the south of the Dugandan railway station.

Dugandan Post Office opened on 11 September 1887 (a receiving office had been open from 1881) and closed in 1929.

In 1882, the Primitive Methodist Church congregation had grown too large to continue to use the Provisional School. Thomas Hardcastle donated 1 acre (0.40 ha) of land for a church on Old Mount Alford Road near the former Dugandan Bridge. There was a ceremonial cutting of the first sod on Saturday 23 December 1882 by Miss Jessie Hardcastle. The church was 22 by 14 feet (6.7 by 4.3 m) and built by George Beverley and T. Austin. It was officially opened on 4 November 1883. In 1892 concerns about flooding led to fundraising to relocate the church to the southern end of High Street in Boonah (now the location of the manse).

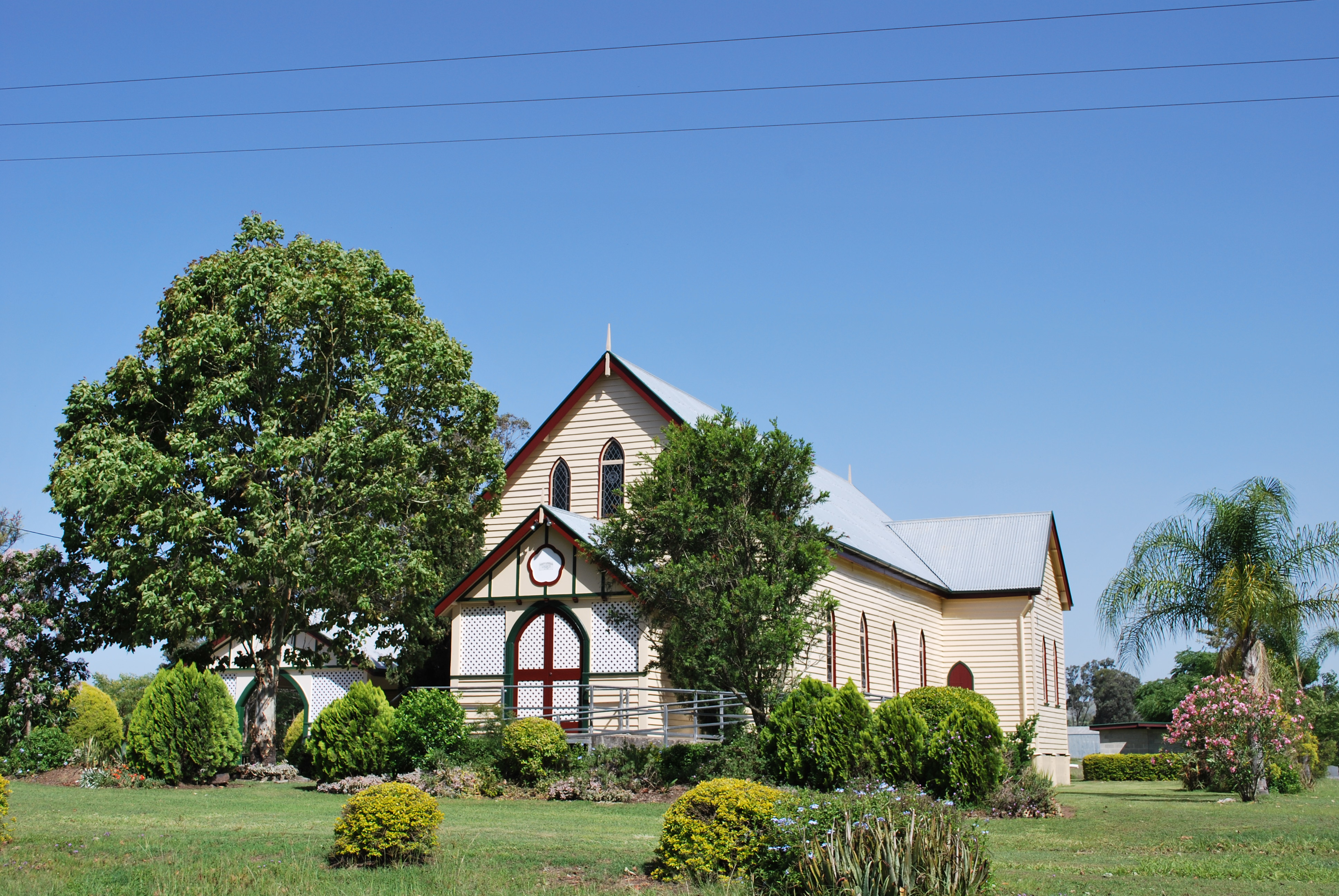
Trinity Lutheran Church, 2008

The Trinity Lutheran church opened on 23 April 1889.

Dugandan State School opened in Dugandan on 13 January 1917 (and is not related to the school which opened in 1878). It closed in 1966. It was at 551 Boonah Rathdowney Road (28.0361°S 152.6581°E).

== Demographics ==
In the 2016 census, the locality of Dugandan had a population of 593 people. The locality contains 254 households, in which 47.7% of the population are males and 52.3% of the population are females with a median age of 45, 7 years above the national average. The average weekly household income is $1,125, $313 below the national average.

In the 2021 census, the locality of Dugandan had a population of 602 people.

== Heritage listings ==
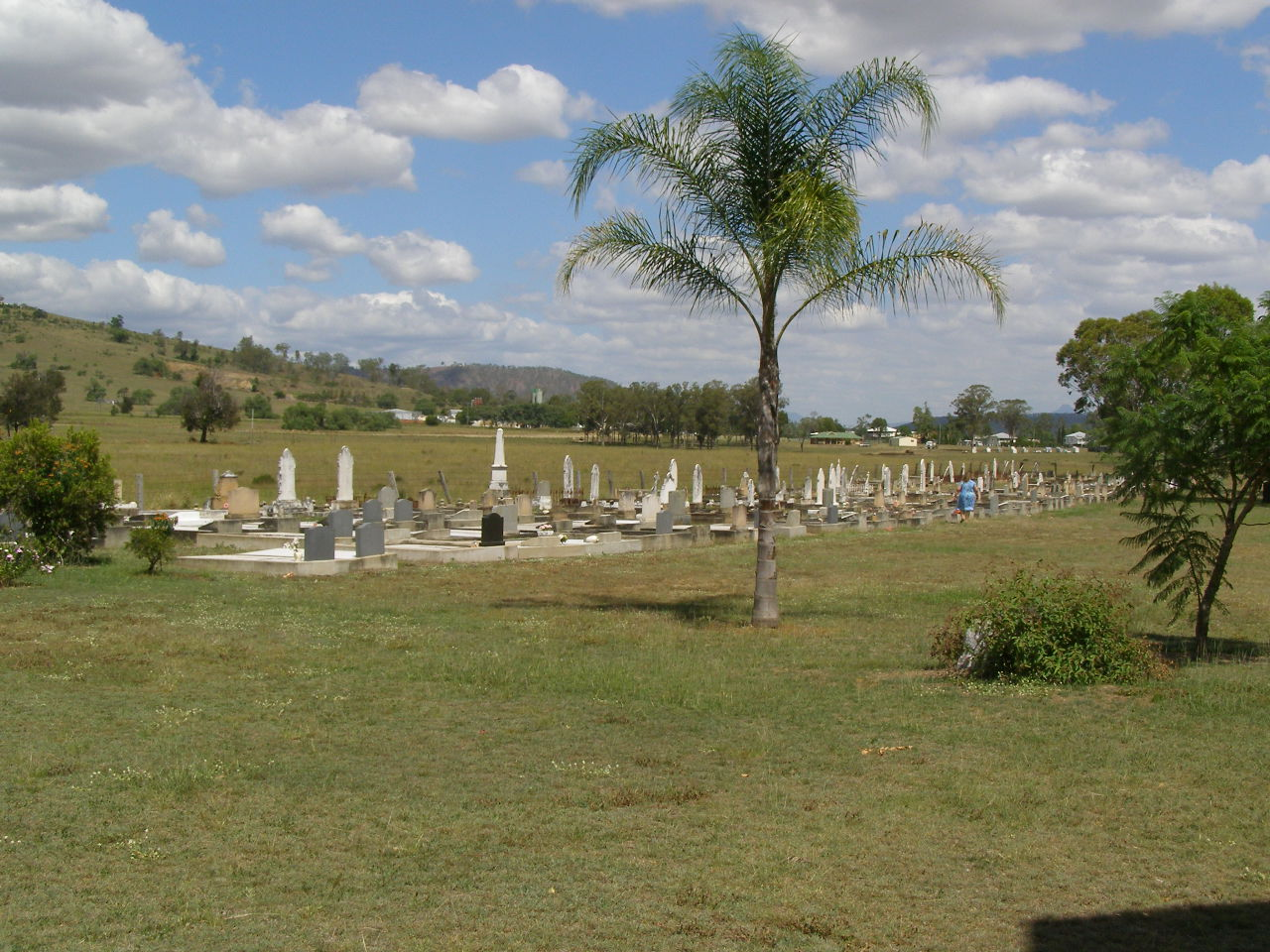
Trinity Lutheran cemetery, 2007

Dugandan has the following heritage sites:

- 124 Boonah-Rathdowney Road: Dugandan Hotel
- 237 Boonah-Rathdowney Road: Trinity Lutheran Church and Cemetery

== Education ==
There are no schools in Dugandan. The nearest government primary schools are Boonah State School in neighbouring Boonah to the north and Mount Alford State School in Mount Alford to the south-west. The nearest government secondary school is Boonah State High School in Boonah.

== Amenities ==
Dugandan Hotel is at 124 Boonah-Rathdowney Road (28.0045°S 152.6808°E).

Trinity Lutheran Church is at 237 Boonah-Rathdowney Road (28.01355°S 152.67569°E).
