= Allandale, Queensland =

Allandale
- Suburb
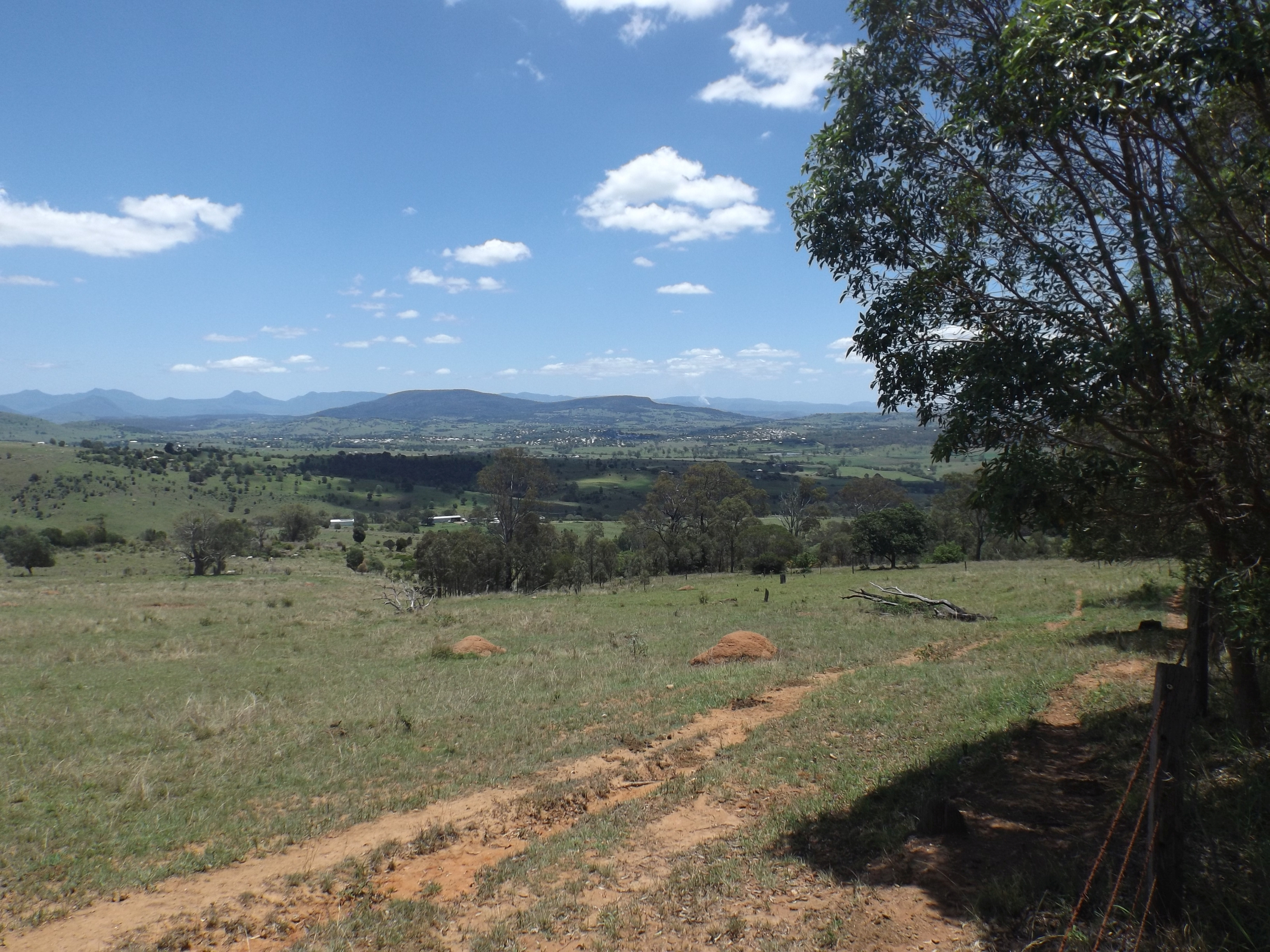
- Paddocks and Mount French, 2016

- Interactive map of Allandale
- Coordinates: 28.0061°S 152.7641°E
- Country: Australia
- State: Queensland
- Location: 5.0 km (3.1 mi) E of Boonah; 39.2 km (24.4 mi) E of Beaudesert; 87.2 km (54.2 mi) SSW of Brisbane CBD

Government
  - State electorate: Scenic Rim
  - Federal division: Wright

Area
  - Total: 48.8 km^{2} (18.8 sq mi)

Population
  - Total: 69 (2021 census)
  - Density: 1.414/km^{2} (3.662/sq mi)
- Time zone: UTC+10:00 (AEST)
- Postcode: 4310
Suburbs around Allandale
Boonah	Coulson	Bromeltom
Dugandan	Allandale	Bromeltom
Milford	Cannon Creek	Kooralbyn

Allandale is a rural locality in the Scenic Rim Region, Queensland, Australia. In the 2021 census, Allandale had a population of 69 people.

== Geography ==
There are no major roads in Allandale.

Teviot Brook flows through the north of Allandale. Some of the land is used for agricultural purposes. The southeast portion is hilly, undeveloped and mostly cleared of natural vegetation. This catchment area is separate from the Teviot Brook watershed, with run-off flowing in to Allan Creek, a tributary of the Logan River to the east.

== History ==
Allandale State School opened on 27 February 1928. It closed on 24 March 1963. It was located near the intersection of Radcliffe/Geiger Road and Hutchinson Road (28.0025°S 152.7297°E).

== Demographics ==
In the 2016 census, Allandale had a population of 56 people. The locality contained 33 households, in which 60.0% of the population are males and 40.0% of the population are females with a median age of 53, 15 years above the national average. The average weekly household income is $850, $588 below the national average.

In the 2021 census, Allandale had a population of 69 people.

== Education ==
There are no schools in Allandale. The nearest government primary schools are Boonah State School in neighbouring Boonah to the north-west and Beaudesert State School in Beaudesert to the east. The nearest government secondary school is Boonah State High School, also in Boonah.
