= Bromelton, Queensland =

Bromelton
- Town
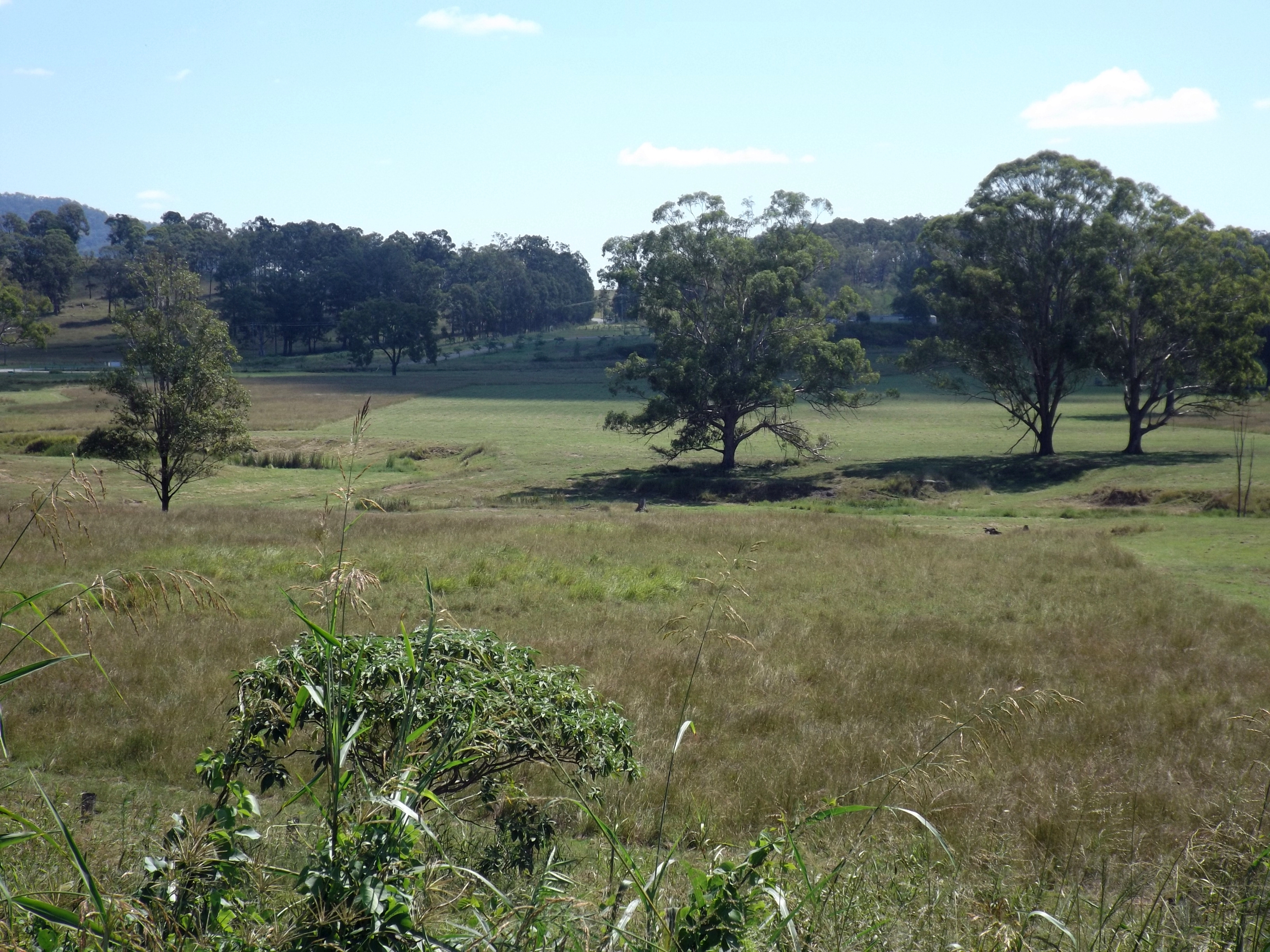
- Paddocks, 2016

- Interactive map of Bromelton
- Coordinates: 27.9866°S 152.8836°E
- Country: Australia
- State: Queensland
- LGA: Scenic Rim Region
- Location: 3.7 km (2.3 mi) NW of Beaudesert; 35.9 km (22.3 mi) E of Boonah; 65.9 km (40.9 mi) S of Brisbane CBD

Government
  - State electorate: Scenic Rim
  - Federal division: Wright

Area
  - Total: 113.7 km^{2} (43.9 sq mi)

Population
  - Total: 129 (2021 census)
  - Density: 1.135/km^{2} (2.939/sq mi)
- Time zone: UTC+10:00 (AEST)
- Postcode: 4285
Localities around Bromelton
Wyaralong	Allenview	Gleneagle
Coulson	Bromelton	Beaudesert
Allandale	Kooralbyn	Josephville

Bromelton is a rural locality in the Scenic Rim Region, Queensland, Australia. In the 2021 census, the locality of Bromelton had a population of 129 people.

== Geography ==
The Beaudesert–Boonah Road (State Route 90) runs through from east to north.

== History ==
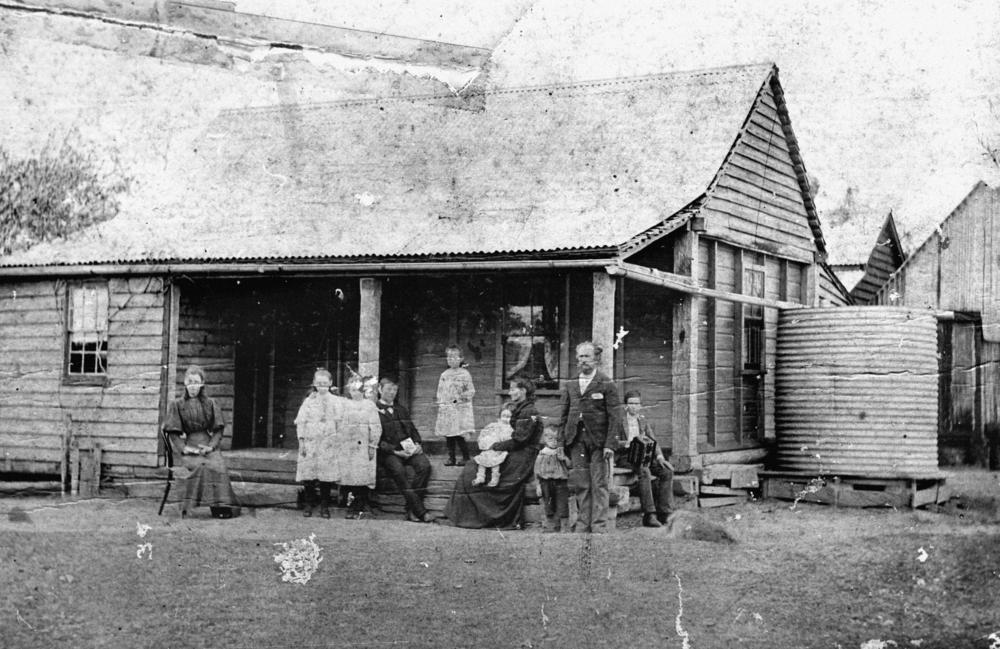
Moloney family, ~1897

Bromelton Post Office opened on 1 July 1927 (a receiving office had been open by 1883) and closed in 1938. In 1842, Hugh Henry Robertson settled a run at Bromelton, becoming the first European to reside in the Logan River valley.

Bromelton Provisional School opened on 25 October 1880. On 1 January 1909 it became Bromelton State School. It closed in 1953. It was on a 30-acre (12 ha) site on the western side of Sandy Creek Road (27.9869°S 152.9389°E).

Allen's Creek Provisional School opened on 4 October 1927 and closed on 18 September 1929. It was a railway camp school and provided schooling for children of workers building the Sydney–Brisbane rail corridor. Allan's Creek (as it is currently spelled) crosses the railway line at the intersection of three present-day localities: Allenview, Bromelton and Gleneagle.

Bromelton railway station was served by a northbound XPT service to Roma Street and a southbound service to Sydney until that service closed in 1994. The station is to the north of Beaudesert-Boonah Road (27.9705°S 152.9262°E).

Bromelton State Development Area (SDA) was declared in 2008, covering 15,000 hectares of land approximately 6 kilometres (3.7 mi) west of Beaudesert. About 1,800 hectares (4,400 acres) was earmarked for industrial development of regional, state and national significance, maximising the use of the area's existing standard gauge railway line which connects Bromelton to the Port of Brisbane, to other parts of Queensland, and to other states of Australia. Mirvac has commenced work on a site bordered by Sandy Creek Road and Beaudesert Boonah Road. The Bromelton SDA applications are reviewed by the Co-ordinator General for approval. The Scenic Rim Regional Council is responsible for operational works, clearing of vegetation, plumbing and Reconfiguration of Lots (ROLs) applications after the MCUs have been approved by the Queensland Government.

In 2016, SCT Logistics commenced building a transport hub adjacent to the Sydney-Brisbane railway line. It opened in January 2017.

== Demographics ==
In the 2016 census, the locality of Bromelton had a population of 155 people. The locality contains 58 households, in which 51.6% of the population are males and 48.4% of the population are females with a median age of 40, 2 years above the national average. The average weekly household income is $1,771, $333 below the national average. 4.0% of Bromelton's population is either of Aborigional or Torres Strait Islander descent. 66.4% of the population aged 15 or over is either registered or de facto married, while 33.6% of the population is not married. 28.8% of the population is currently attending some form of a compulsory education. The most common nominated ancestries were Australian (48.2%), English (25.6%) and Irish (13.1%), while the most common country of birth was Australia (90.3%), and the most commonly spoken language at home was English (94.7%). The most common nominated religions were Catholin (37.4%), Anglican (23.9%) and No Religion (16.6%). The most common occupation was a manager (21.8%) and the majority/plurality of residents worked 40 or more hours per week (39.7%).

In the 2021 census, the locality of Bromelton had a population of 129 people.

== Education ==
There are no schools in Bromelton. The nearest government primary schools are Beaudesert State School in neighbouring Beaudesert to the east, Gleneagle State School in neighbouring Gleneagle to the north-east, and Boonah State School in Boonah to the west. The nearest government secondary schools are Beaudesert State High School in Beaudesert and Boonah State High School in Boonah.

== Transport ==
The town has a crossing loop on the Sydney to Brisbane standard gauge line.

SCT Logistics operates a rail-road transport hub at 2603 Beaudesert Boonah Road (27.9642°S 152.9219°E).

The Australian Rail Track Corporation has also purchased land in Bromleton.

== Notable people ==
- Thomas de Montmorency Murray-Prior, born in Bromelton, Member of the Queensland Legislative Assembly
- Rosa Campbell Praed, born in Bromelton, Australian novelist

== See also ==
- List of rail yards
