= Mount Alford, Queensland =

Mount Alford
- Town
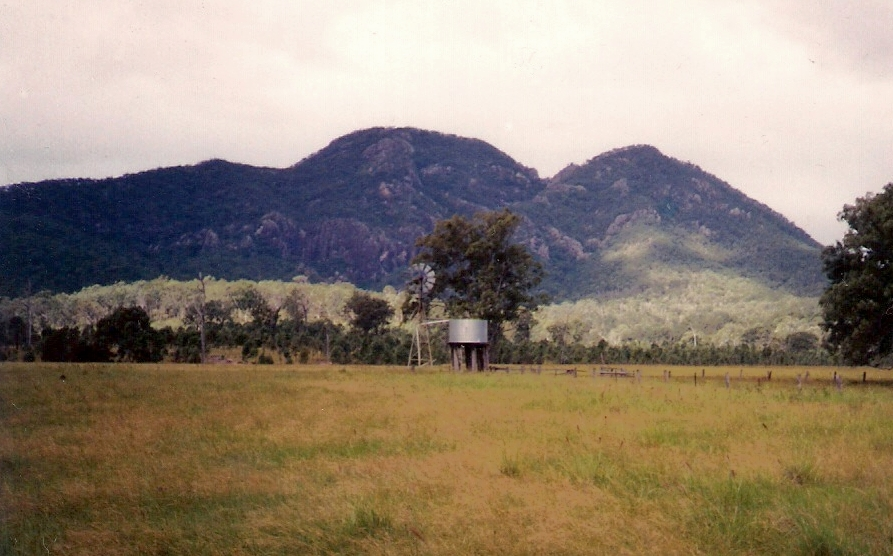
- Paddocks to the north east of Mount Moon

- Interactive map of Mount Alford
- Coordinates: 28.0652°S 152.5963°E
- Country: Australia
- State: Queensland
- LGA: Scenic Rim Region
- Location: 13.9 km (8.6 mi) SW of Boonah; 53.0 km (32.9 mi) W of Beaudesert; 60.3 km (37.5 mi) SSW of Ipswich; 100 km (62 mi) SW of Brisbane

Government
  - State electorate: Scenic Rim
  - Federal division: Wright

Area
  - Total: 40.1 km^{2} (15.5 sq mi)
- Elevation: 120 m (390 ft)

Population
  - Total: 294 (2021 census)
  - Density: 7.332/km^{2} (18.99/sq mi)
- Time zone: UTC+10:00 (AEST)
- Postcode: 4310
Localities around Mount Alford
Moogerah	Charlwood; Bunjurgen	Wallaces Creek
Moogerah	Mount Alford	Coochin
Moogerah	Croftby	Croftby

Mount Alford is a rural town and locality in the Scenic Rim Region, Queensland, Australia. In the 2021 census, the locality of Mount Alford had a population of 294 people.

== Geography ==
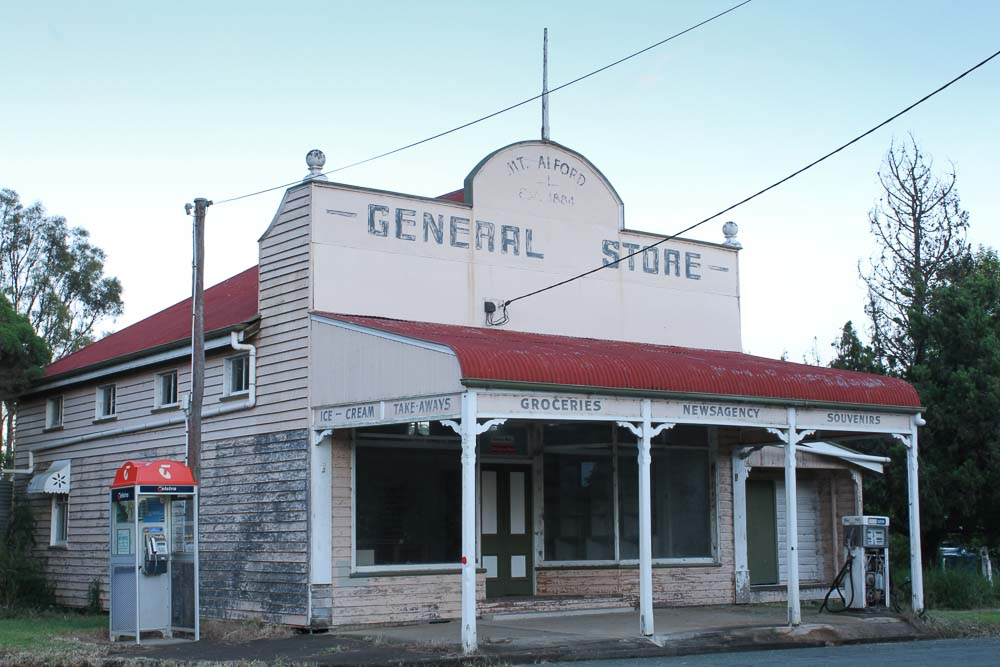
Mount Alford General Store

Mount Alford is a typical scenic Rim community surrounded by rich agricultural land. Teviot Brook passes just to the east of the town. Downstream is the Wyaralong Dam. Erosion along Blackrock Creek has prompted the Scenic Rim Regional Council and SEQ Catchments to implement on-farm infrastructure and land management practice changes to reduce sediment runoff and improve water quality. In the south west of the locality the land slopes upwards towards Mount Moon. Directly to the north and west of Mount Alford is Moogerah Dam and the Moogerah Peaks. The larger settlement of Boonah is located nearby with main roads linking to Ipswich and Beaudesert.

== History ==
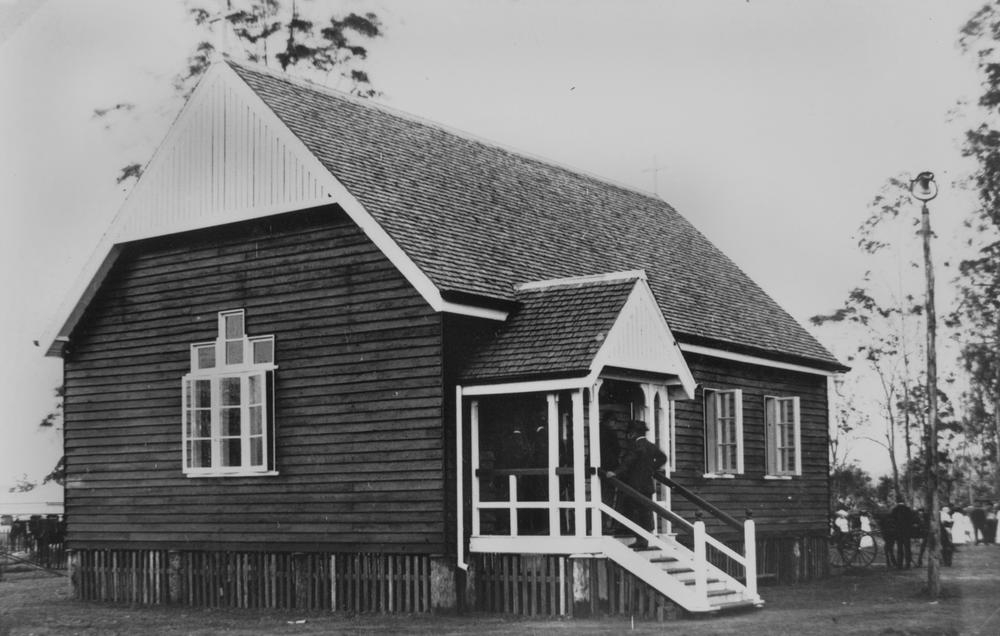
St Peters Church of England, circa 1919

Mount Alford was previously known as Reckumpilla. It was renamed after Thomas Alford who managed Coochin Coochin station from 1868 onwards.

A general store opened in the town in c1888 by August Anders.The building was rebuilt in 1913 upon sale by the Anders family. The building is now home to the Scenic Rim Brewery.

Mount Alford Provisional School opened on 4 April 1888. On 1 January 1901, it became Mount Alford State School.

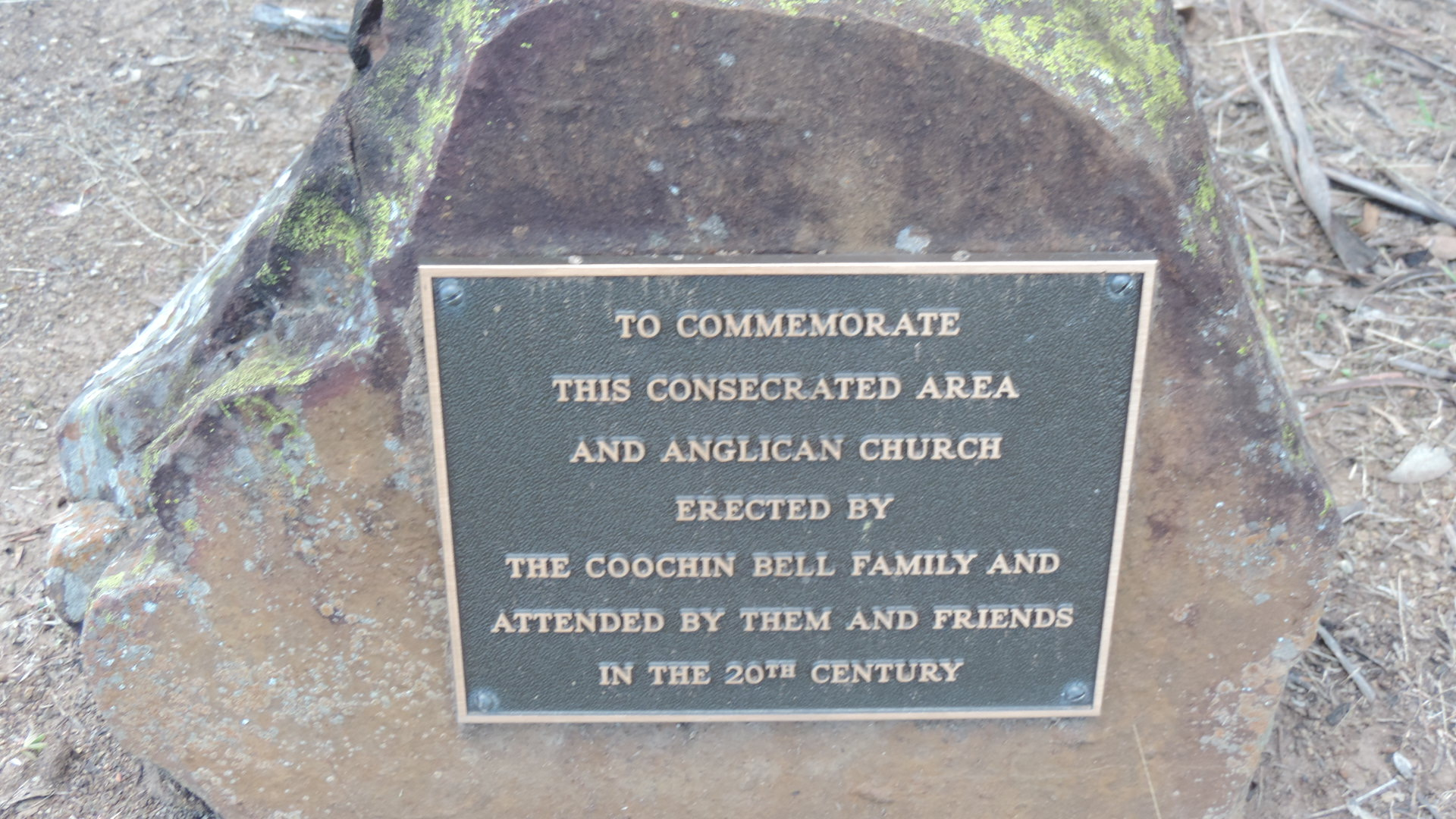
Plaque marking the location of St Peter's Anglican Church and cemetery, Mount Alford, 2017

From 1898, Anglican church services were held at the school, led by A.J.C. Rivett. In April 1914, Mrs Gertude Augusta Bell of Coochin Coochin donated £30 to commence a building fund for an Anglican church in Mount Alford. On 16 November 1918, Bishop Henry Le Fanu laid the foundation stone for the Anglican church on the northeastern corner of Reckumpilla Street and Cavanagah Street (28.0655°S 152.5952°E). Tenders were called for a builder in January 1919; it was built by Mr Kelleher. St Peter's Anglican church was dedicated on Saturday 25 November 1919 by the Anglican Archbishop of Brisbane St Clair Donaldson. The church was made from wood with a shingle roof and all its furnishings were made from silky oak. It was 46 feet long and 26 feet wide with a chancel of 12 feet by 8 feet. The cost of the church was about £900 of which £150 remained unpaid when the church was opened.

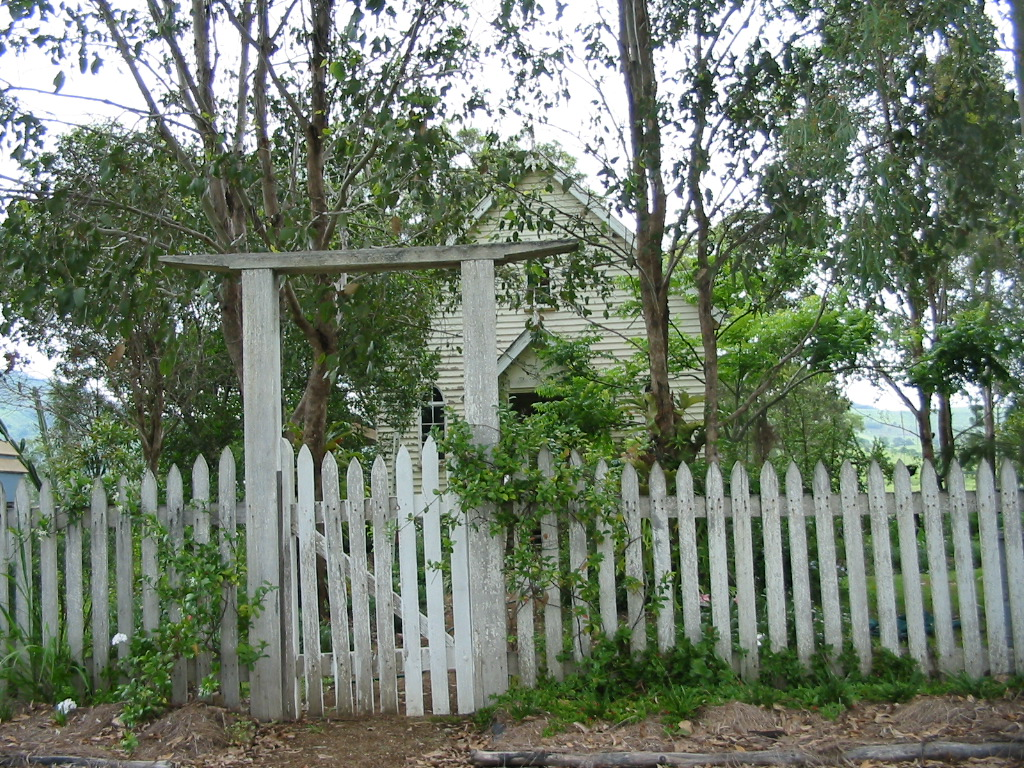
Former St John's Lutheran Church, Mount Alford, 2005

The first Lutheran services in Mount Alford were held in the School of Arts by Pastor Christian Wilhelm Seybold. On 23 October 1908, a meeting was held that decided to build a church. Mr Wissemann offered an acre of land. By December 1908, local Lutherans had raised £120 towards a church building. The church was built by the Behrendorff family (Ambrosius Victor, Wilhelm Carl Johann, and Carl) using sawn timber for the Behrendorff sawmill. The finished church was 30 feet long and 24 feet wide and cost £155 (including the fence). The Lutheran church in Mount Alford was opened and dedicated on 7 May 1909. The original trust for the church stipulated that only married men and widowers could be trustees (but not bachelors). An English Sunday School commenced on 26 August 1911 (most Lutheran churches conducted their activities entirely in German until World War I at which time many switched to the use of English to avoid suspicion about their loyalties). The first baptism in the church was W. Behrendorff. The first couple to be married in the church were Wilhelm Labuschewski and Mary Louisa Kaden on 27 September 1911. The church building was lined in 1936 for its 25th anniversary. A bible was presented by Mr and Mrs J. Gesler in 1943. In 1956 Charles Behrendorff made a baptismal font and a new altar was built in 1959. The pastors of the church (until 1988) were Christian Wilhelm Seybold, Rudolf Monz, Anton Hiller, Martin Frederick Prenzler, Alfred Hugo Schubert, Gerald David Dahlenberg, David Frederick Siegle, J. Perkins, R. Goldhardt, and K.D. Kotzur. The church subsequently closed and is in use as a private residence, but a notice over its doorway says "St John's Lutheran Church – Estd 1909".

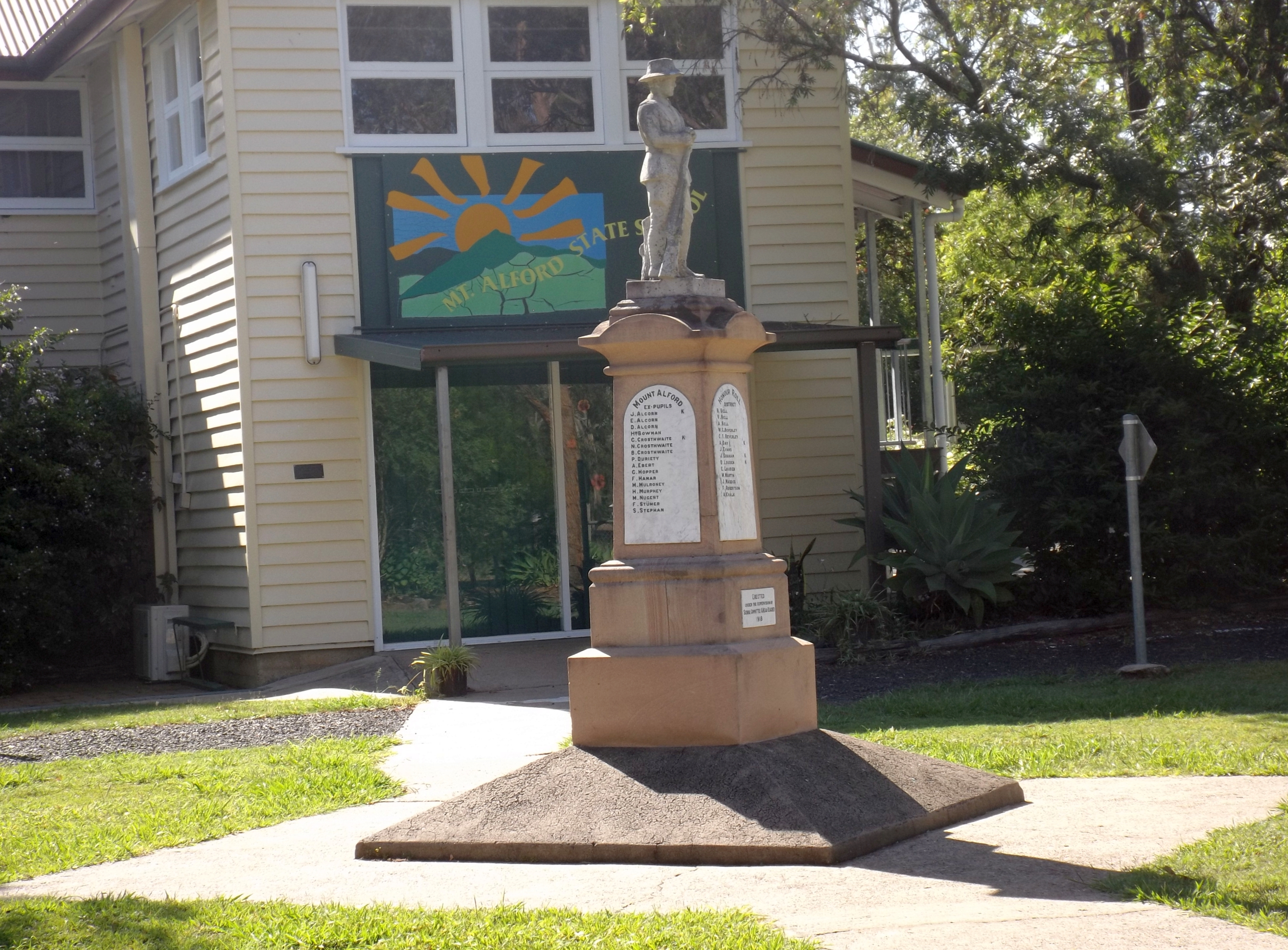
War memorial at Mount Alford State School, 2016

A monument to those who served and who were killed in World War I was unveiled at Mount Alford State School on Saturday 25 May 1918 by John Douglas Story, (Undersecretary for Education in Queensland). It is the smallest "digger" statue on a war memorial in Queensland. The Methodist church opened in December 1921.

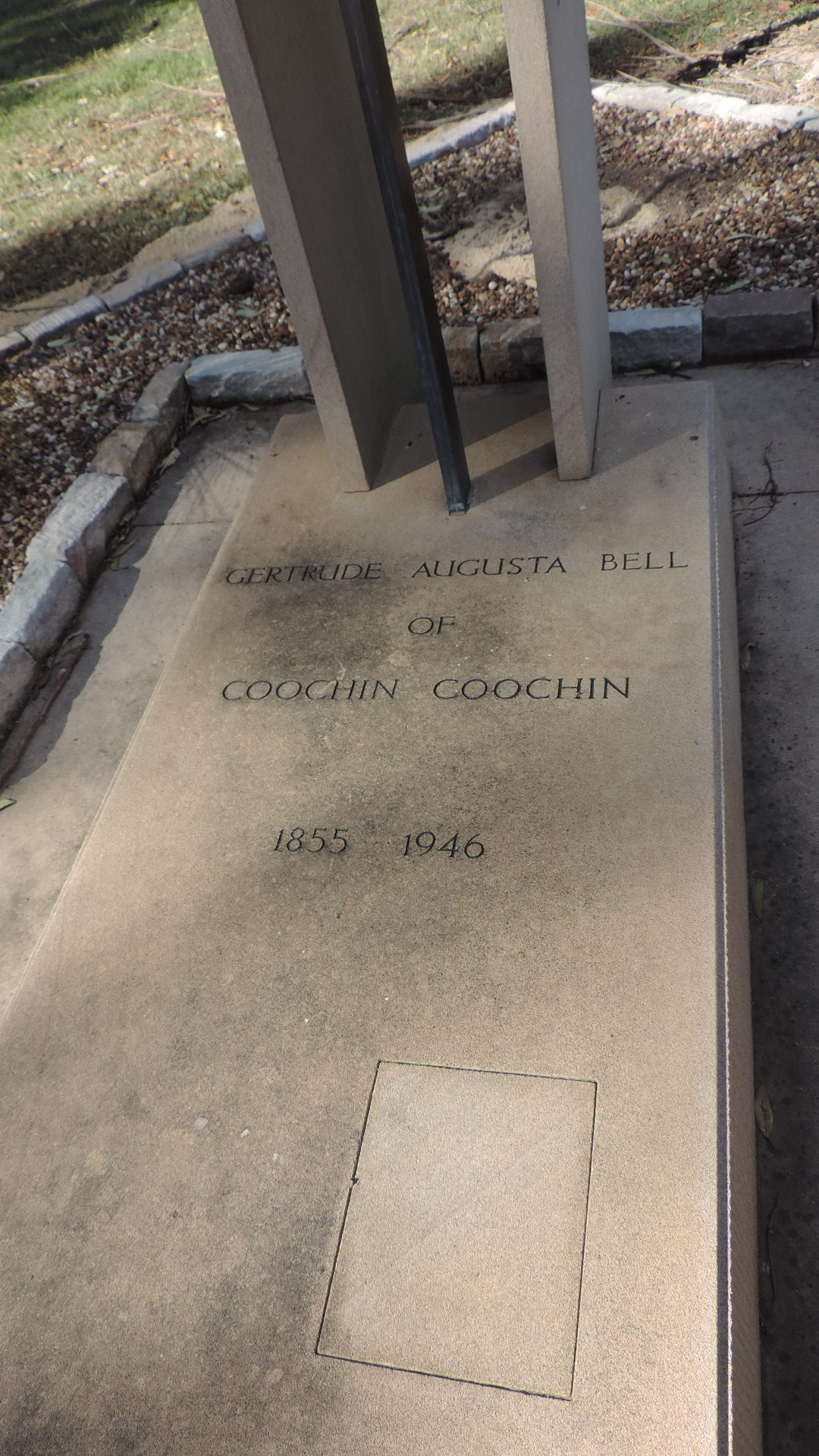
Memorial for Gertrude Augusta Bell, Bowman Park, Mount Alford, 2017

An Anglican cemetery was established with its first burial (Gertrude Augusta Bell) on Sunday 11 August 1946. The church held its last service on 25 December 1969. On 11 December 1973, it was decided to sell the church building for removal. In 2017, Bowman Park occupies the site of the church and cemetery. A plaque commemorates the church and a memorial commemorates the Bell family members who were buried there.

== Demographics ==
In the 2016 census, the locality of Mount Alford had a population of 268 people. The locality contained 123 households, in which 47.5% of the population were males and 52.5% of the population were females with a median age of 53, 15 years above the national average. The average weekly household income was $1,218, $220 below the national average. 3.0% of Mount Alford's population was either of Aboriginal or Torres Strait Islander descent. 75.6% of the population aged 15 or over was either registered or de facto married, while 24.4% of the population is not married. 21.3% of the population was attending some form of education. The most common nominated ancestries were English (32.1%), Australian (27.1%) and German (15.6%), while the most common country of birth was Australia (88.3%), and the most commonly spoken language at home was English (94.4%). The most common nominated religions were No religion (32.9%), Anglican (20.8%) and Catholic (12.5%). The most common occupation was a labourer (21.9%) and the majority/plurality of residents worked 40 or more hours per week (36.4%).

In the 2021 census, the locality of Mount Alford had a population of 294 people.

== Heritage listings ==
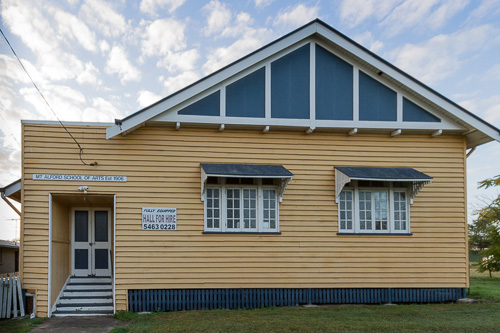
Mount Alford School of Arts established 1906

Mount Alford has the following heritage-listed sites:

- Mount Alford School of Arts, 889 Reckumpilla Street
- Mount Alford General Store, 898 Reckumpilla Street

== Education ==
Mount Alford State School is a government primary (Prep–6) school for boys and girls at 942 Reckumpilla Street (28.0682°S 152.5947°E). In 2018, the school had an enrolment of 62 students with 9 teachers (4 full-time equivalent) and 11 non-teaching staff (5 full-time equivalent).

There are no secondary schools in Mount Alford. The nearest government secondary school is Boonah State High School in Boonah to the north-east.
