= Greater Flagstone =

Greater Flagstone is a district and development area located within the Logan City local government area in south-east Queensland, Australia. Greater Flagstone is situated along the Sydney–Brisbane rail corridor between two future employment precincts at North Maclean and Bromelton. Greater Flagstone is expected to provide approximately 50,000 dwellings to house a population of up to 120,000 people with a development plan expected to take 30–40 years. The suburb of Flagstone was gazetted in 1997 and district suburbs were gazetted from 2016.

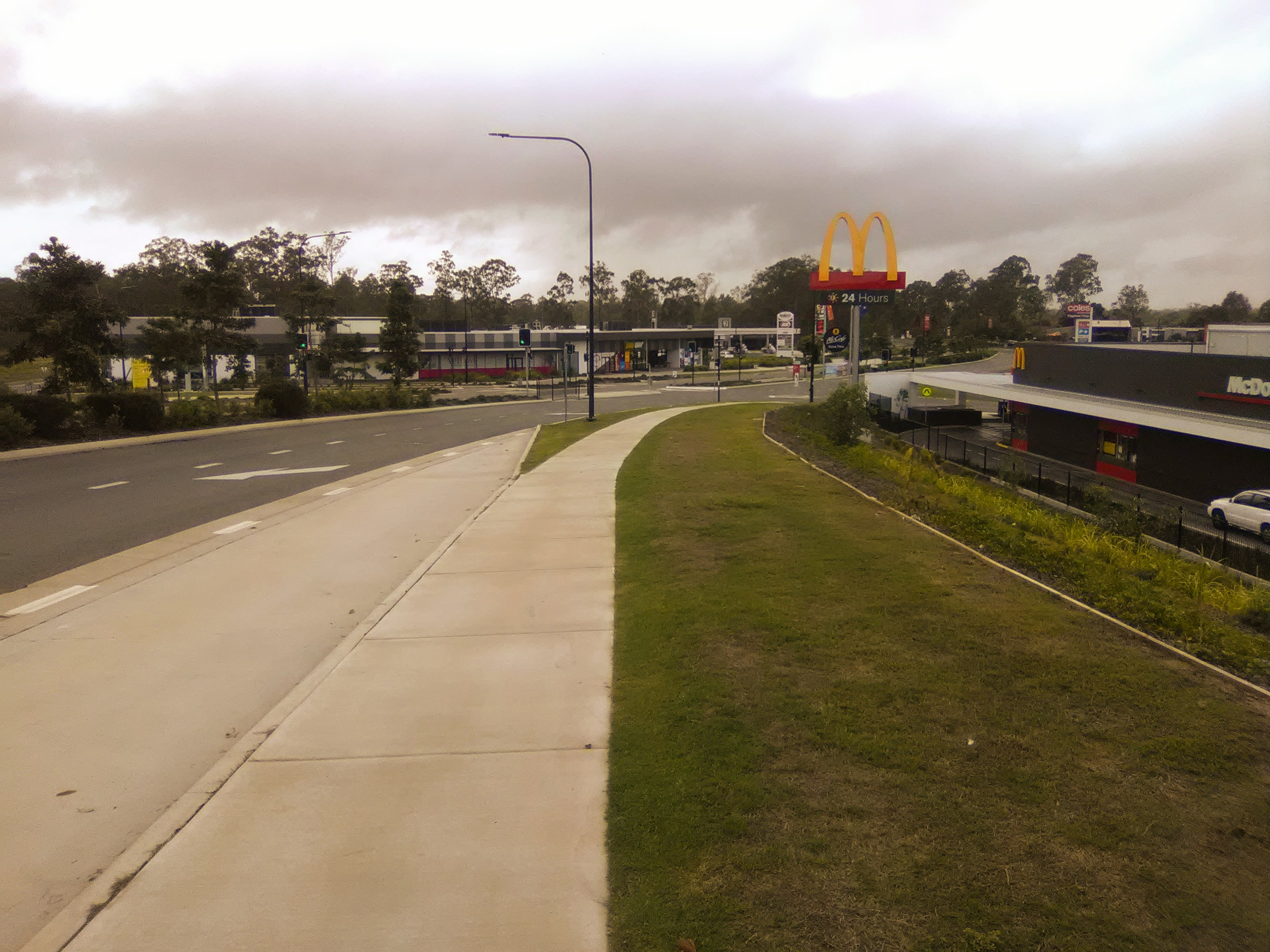
Homestead Drive, Flagstone, Queensland

== History ==
Greater Flagstone is situated in the Bundjalung traditional Indigenous Australian country. The name Flagstone is from Flagstone Creek which flows into the Logan River just south of Chadwick Drive in South Maclean (27.8017°S 153.0053°E). Greater Flagstone was previously part of the Undullah and Jimboomba areas before being excised into Flagstone and district suburbs.

== Suburbs ==
- Flagstone
- Flinders Lakes
- Monarch Glen
- Silverbark Ridge
- Glenlogan
- Riverbend
