= Jimboomba =

- Town
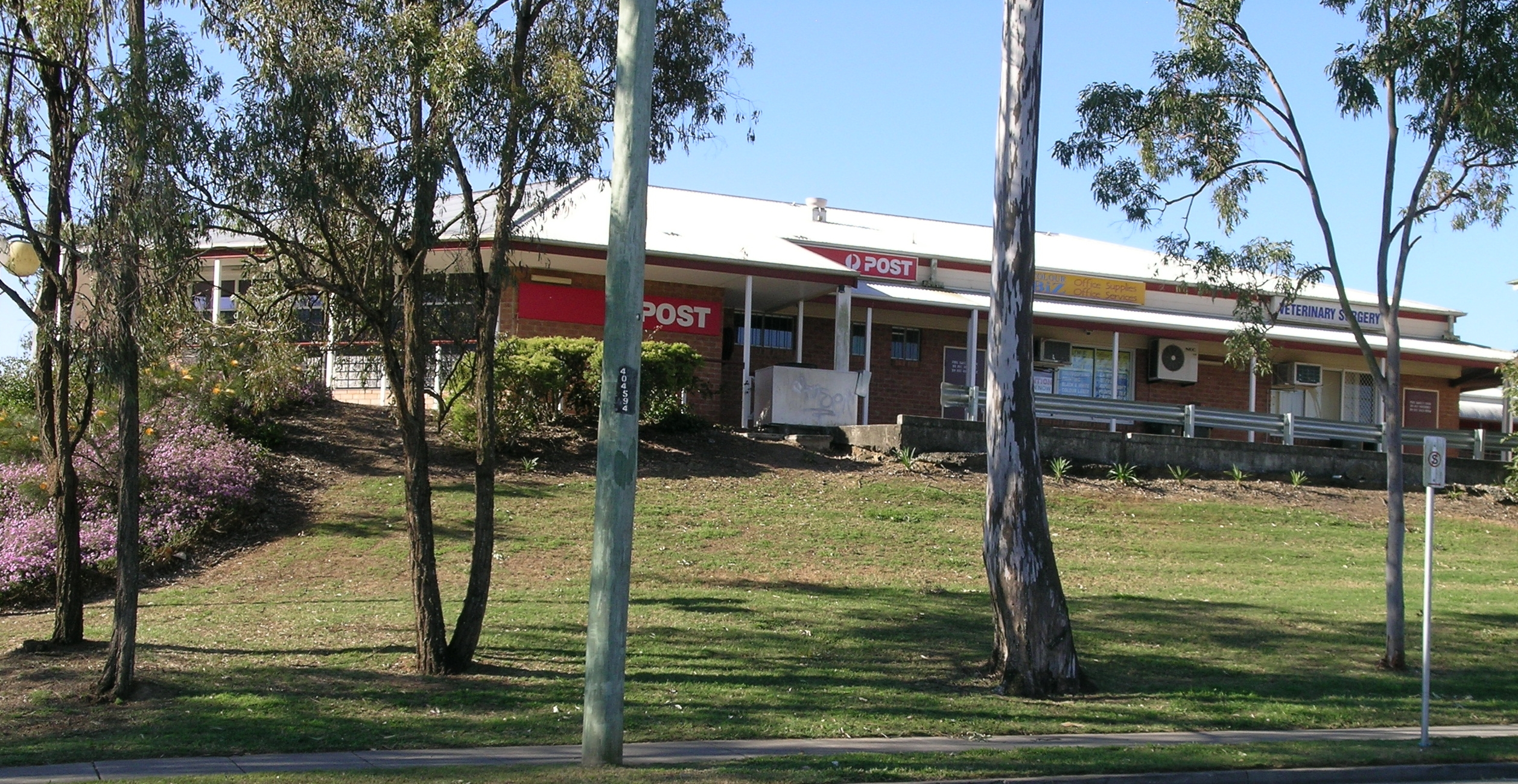
- The post office and veterinary surgery, Jimboomba

- Interactive map of Jimboomba
- Coordinates: 27.8300°S 153.0313°E
- Country: Australia
- State: Queensland
- LGA: Logan City
- Location: 29.6 km (18.4 mi) SSE of Logan Central; 48.7 km (30.3 mi) S of Brisbane CBD
- Established: 1845

Government
  - State electorate: Logan
  - Federal division: Wright

Area
  - Total: 54.2 km^{2} (20.9 sq mi)

Population
  - Total: 7,423 (2021 census)
  - Density: 136.96/km^{2} (354.7/sq mi)
- Time zone: UTC+10:00 (AEST)
- Postcode: 4280
Localities around Jimboomba
South Maclean	Stockleigh	Logan Village
Riverbend; Glenlogan	Jimboomba	Tamborine
Cedar Grove	Cedar Vale	Mundoolun

Jimboomba is a town and locality in the City of Logan, Queensland, Australia. In the 2021 census, the locality of Jimboomba had a population of 7,423 people.

== Geography ==
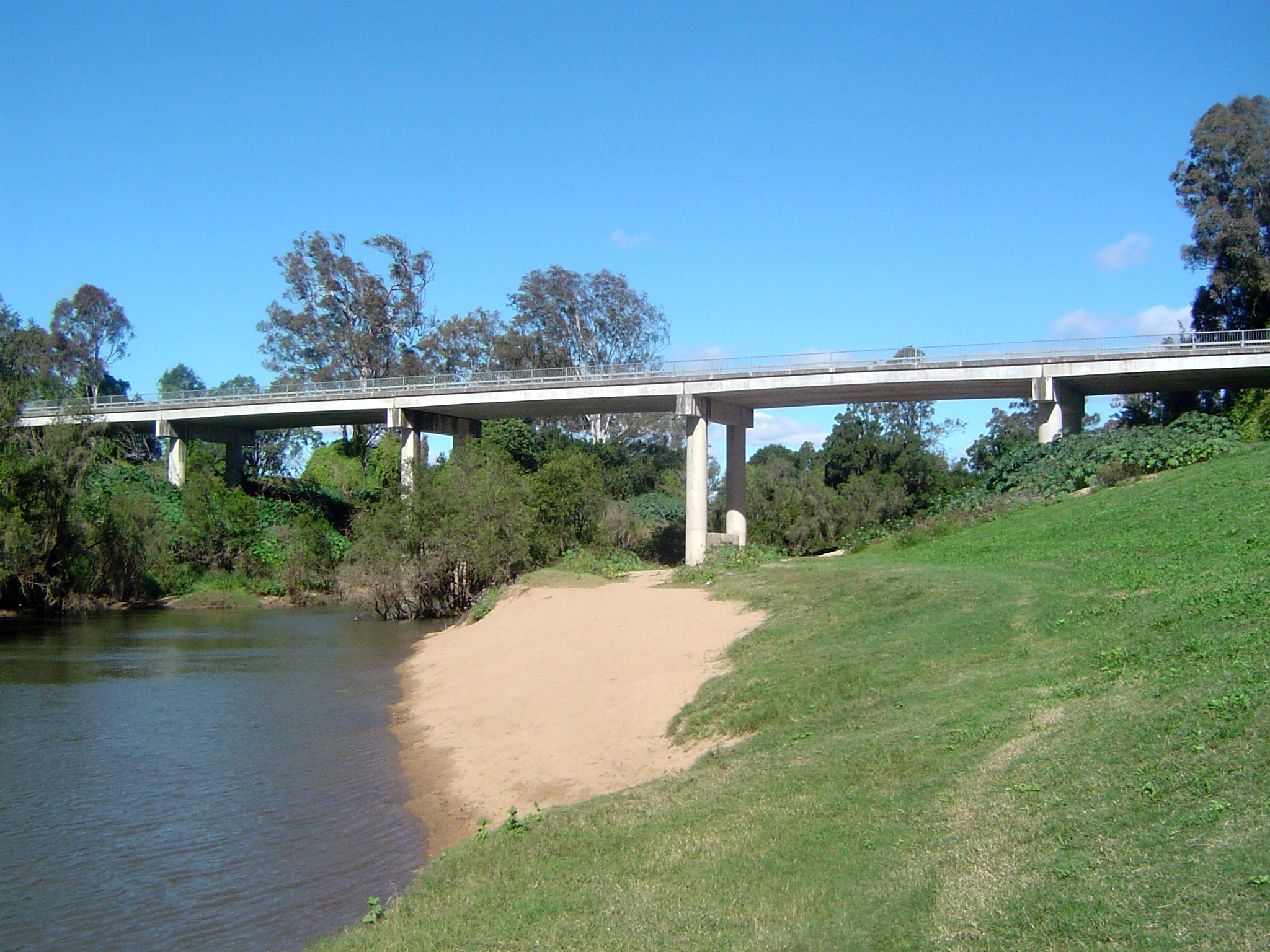
Payne Bridge over the Logan River, 2011

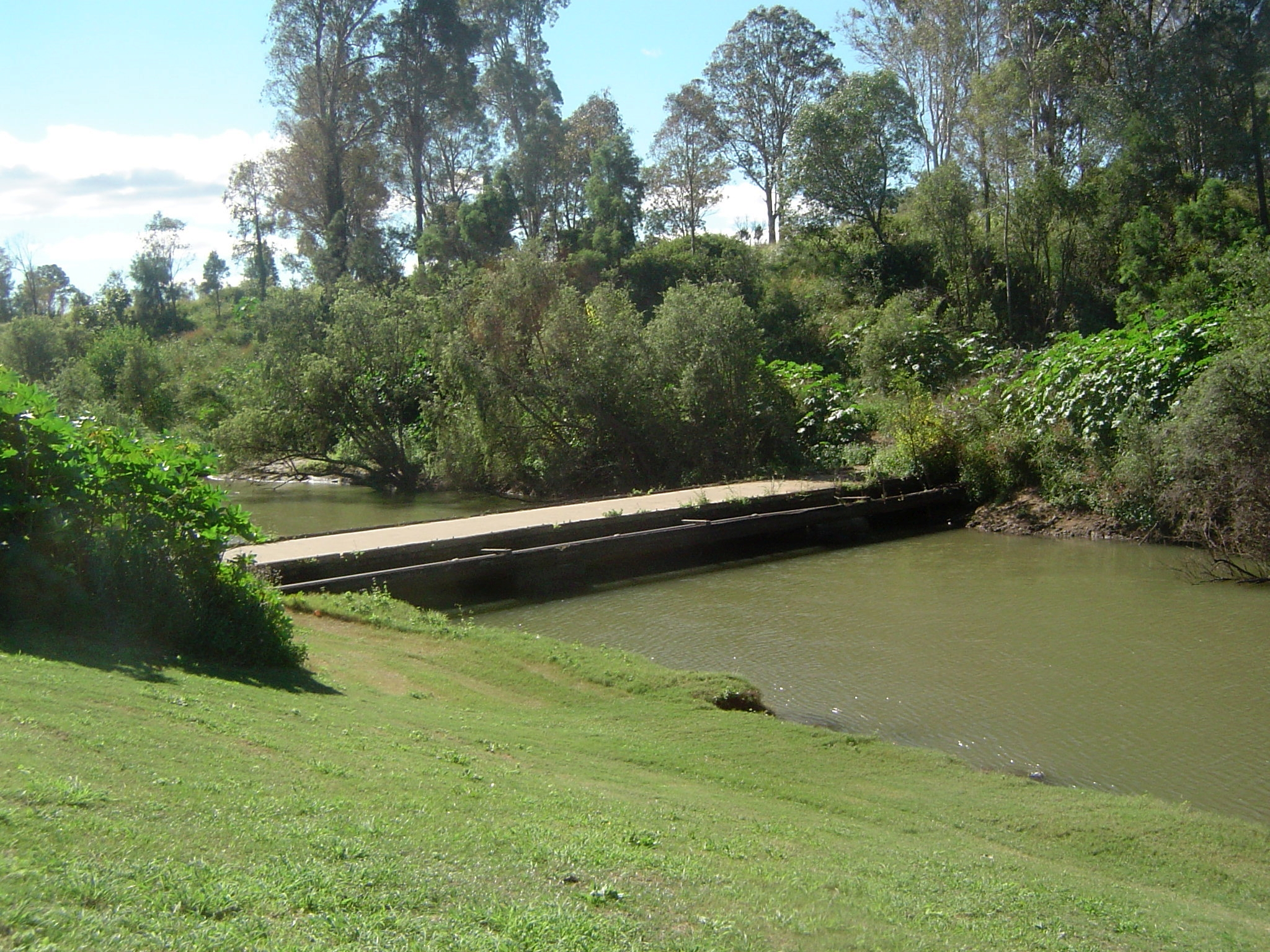
Old low-level bridge across the Logan River, 2011

Jimboomba is situated on the Mount Lindesay Highway, 29.6 kilometres (18.4 mi) by road south-east of Logan Central and 48.7 kilometres (30.3 mi) by road south of Brisbane central business district. The western part of Jimboomba is bordered by the new suburb of Glenlogan and the Logan River; the only bridge within the locality is Payne Bridge on Cusack Lane (27.82068°S 153.00428°E). There is a low-level older bridge immediately to the north of Payne Bridge, but this cannot be used by vehicular traffic.

The Queensland Government's current plan is that Jimboomba will become a major residential and business area within the Brisbane metropolitan region, as part of the Greater Flagstone Priority Development Area, which will house up to 150,000 additional residents in coming decades.

Although historically a rural area, as at 2021, the land use in Jimboomba is almost entirely residential.

== History ==
The original spelling was Gimboomba, named after a sheep and livestock station based where the township is today, stretching some distance north, east and south to neighbouring areas. Gimboomba is a Gugingin word (the First Australian peoples of the area, of Yugambeh country) meaning place of loud thunder and little rain. It was leased for grazing in those days and was taken up by Thomas Dowse during 1845–48. It was then transferred to Sydney publican Robert Rowlands and was later taken up by Andrew Inglis Henderson in 1851 to be used as a sheep run and subsequently for cattle grazing.

Jimboomba railway station (27.8300°S 153.0333°E) was on the disused Beaudesert railway line from Bethania to Beaudesert that was established to service the abattoir in Beaudesert. The line opened on 16 May 1888. The line was closed in 1995 and then reopened and operated as a tourist service as far as Logan Village by railway enthusiasts from 1999 until mid-2004. Funds were harder to raise and depleted quickly for the line so it was closed permanently.

Jimboomba Timber Reserve Provisional School opened circa 1899. In 1906 it was renamed Martindale Provisional School. On 1 January 1909 it became Martindale State School. It was in the area of Gittins Road (now in Riverbend, approx 27.8340°S 152.9541°E). It closed in 1922. The school building was then relocated to Cedar Grove, where it opened as Cedar Grove State School in 1923. It closed in 1965.

Jimboomba Provisional School opened on 12 May 1890, becoming Jimboomba State School on 1 June 1900.

Emmaus Primary School opened in 2002. Sponsored by Brisbane Catholic Education, the school was established as an ecumenical school in association with the local Anglican, Lutheran and Uniting Church communities. In 2005, it was renamed Emmaus College in preparation for adding secondary education in 2006.

Formerly in the Shire of Beaudesert, Jimboomba became part of Logan City following the local government amalgamations in March 2008.

South Queensland Academy (SQA), a Japanese international school, opened in Jimboomba in 1992. It closed in 2006. It was located at Lot 4, Johanna Street. It was replaced by the Hills International College.

On 29 September 2017, areas in the east of the locality were excised to create the new localities of Glenlogan and Riverbend and to allow for the expansion of the boundaries of Flagstone and South Maclean.

== Demographics ==
In the 2016 census, the locality of Jimboomba had a population of 13,201 people, 49.4% female and 50.6% male. The median age of the Jimboomba population was 34 years, 4 years below the national median of 38. 78.75% of people living in Jimboomba were born in Australia. The other top responses for country of birth were New Zealand 5.2%, England 4.8%, Scotland 0.6%, South Africa 0.6%, Scotland 0.5%, Netherlands 0.4%. 91% of people spoke only English at home; the next most common languages were 0.5% Hmong, 0.3% Cantonese, 0.2% Dutch, 0.2% German, 0.2% Japanese.

In the 2021 census, the locality of Jimboomba had a population of 7,423 people. This was lower than the 2016 census, reflecting the excision of land from the locality in 2017.

== Economy ==
Historic industries are timber-getting and the grazing of sheep and cattle.

== Education ==
Jimboomba State School is a government primary (Prep-6) school for boys and girls at Mount Lindesay Highway (27.8299°S 153.0265°E). In 2018, the school had an enrolment of 837 students with 60 teachers (54 full-time equivalent) and 38 non-teaching staff (22 full-time equivalent). It includes a special education program.

Emmaus College is an ecumenical primary and secondary (Prep-12) school for boys and girls at 48 East Street (27.8339°S 153.0379°E). In 2018, the school had an enrolment of 1,379 students with 86 teachers (83 full-time equivalent) and 49 non-teaching staff (41 full-time equivalent).

Hills International College is a private primary and secondary (Prep-12) school for boys and girls at Lot 4 Johanna Street (27.8165°S 153.0179°E). In 2018, the school had an enrolment of 487 students with 45 teachers (42 full-time equivalent) and 29 non-teaching staff (26 full-time equivalent).

There are no government secondary schools in Jimboomba. The nearest government secondary schools are Flagstone State Community College in Flagstone to the west and Park Ridge State High School in Park Ridge to the north.

== Facilities ==
The Logan City Council operate a public library at 18 - 22 Honora Street.

== Greater Flagstone urban development ==
The suburb of Flagstone started off on the eastern side of the Sydney to Brisbane railway line and has now expanded west over the railway line where the proposed town centre will be constructed. More residential developments are starting in Undullah and will expand north into South Maclean, Monarch Glen, Flinders Lakes, Silverbark Ridge, New Beith and Greenbank. This is known as the Greater Flagstone development area. The total area encompassed by the project is 7,188 hectares (17,760 acres). Final approval for the project was granted in October 2011.
