= North Maclean, Queensland =

North Maclean
- Suburb
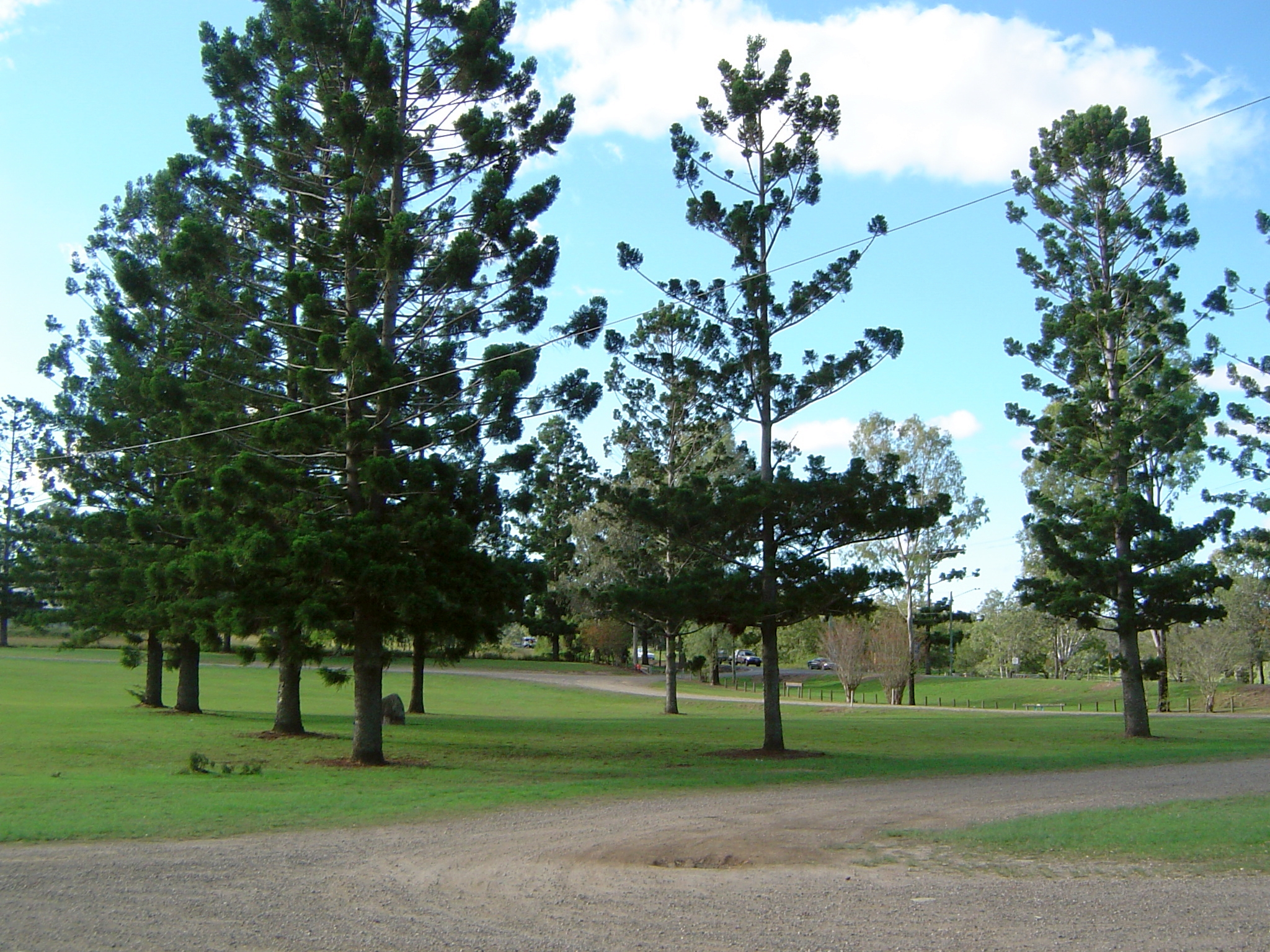
- Tully Memorial Park, 2014

- Interactive map of North Maclean
- Coordinates: 27.7663°S 152.9977°E
- Country: Australia
- State: Queensland
- City: City of Logan
- LGA: City of Logan
- Location: 7.6 km (4.7 mi) NE of Flagstone; 20.4 km (12.7 mi) SW of Park Ridge; 24.2 km (15.0 mi) SW of Logan Central; 45.4 km (28.2 mi) SSW of Brisbane CBD

Government
  - State electorate: Logan
  - Federal divisions: Forde; Wright

Area
  - Total: 20.5 km^{2} (7.9 sq mi)

Population
  - Total: 1,581 (2021 census)
  - Density: 77.12/km^{2} (199.7/sq mi)
- Time zone: UTC+10:00 (AEST)
- Postcode: 4280
Suburbs around North Maclean
New Beith	Greenbank	Munruben
New Beith	North Maclean	Stockleigh
New Beith	South Maclean	South Maclean

North Maclean is a locality in the City of Logan, Queensland, Australia. In the 2021 census, North Maclean had a population of 1,581 people.

== Geography ==
North Maclean is on the Mount Lindesay Highway with the Logan River as part of its eastern and southern boundary. South Maclean is immediately to the south of North Maclean. The western boundary of North Maclean is marked by the Sydney–Brisbane rail corridor.

== History ==
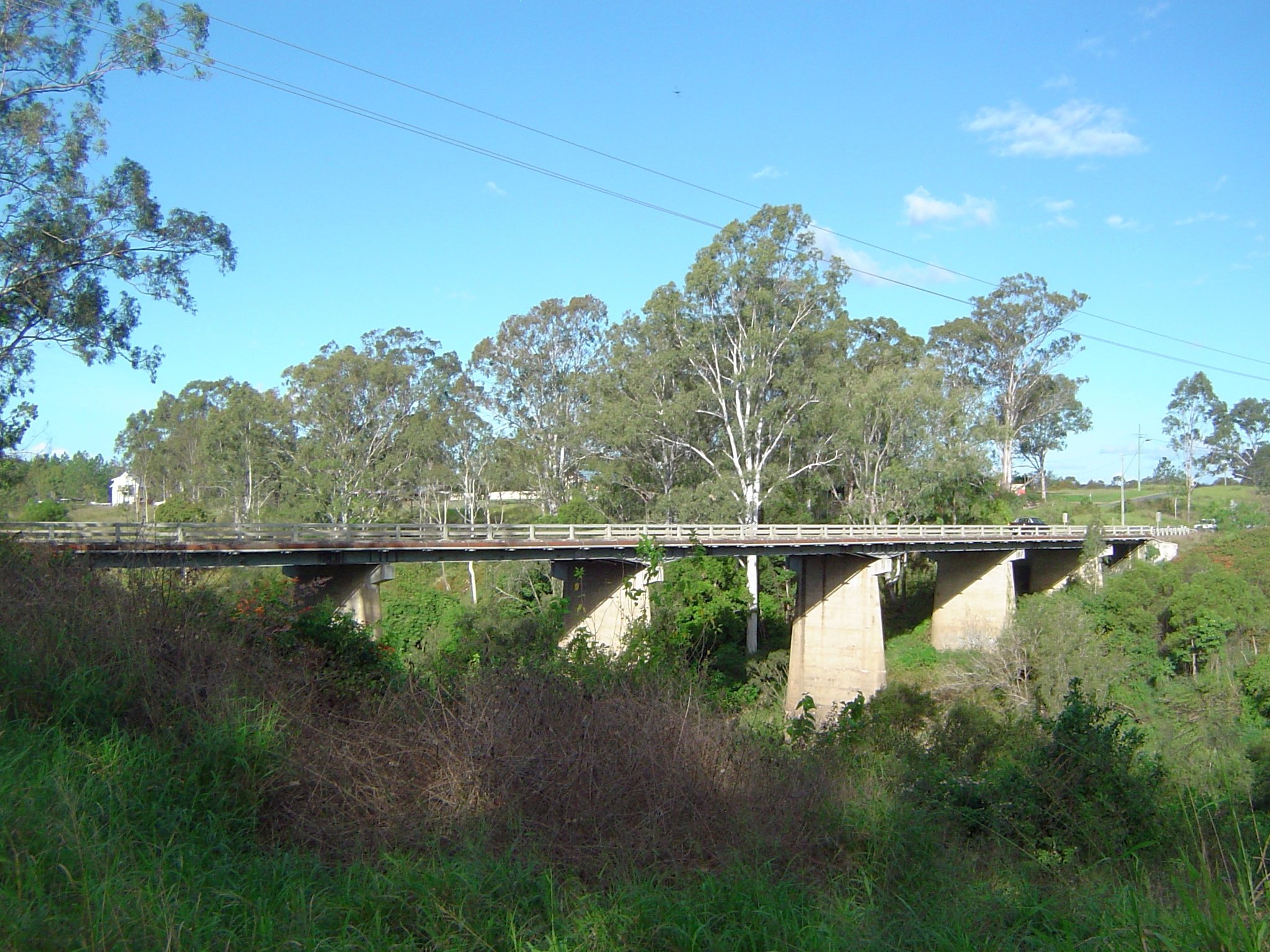
Maclean Bridge from Tully Memorial Park, 2014

North and South Maclean were once a single district originally known as Logan Bridge, as there was a low-level bridge across the Logan River at this location since 1860. The district later acquired the name Maclean, probably after Alexander Grant McLean, the acting Surveyor General of New South Wales from 1856—1861.

The township with blocks on both sides of the river was surveyed in 1863.

North Maclean Provisional School opened on 18 July 1882 and closed in 1912.

Maclean Provisional School opened on 16 April 1926 with teacher Ruby Eunice Dunn. Later that year it was upgraded to Maclean State School. It closed in 1963. It was at 4805-4831 Mount Lindesay Highway (27.7783°S 153.0117°E).

Formerly in the Shire of Beaudesert, North Maclean became part of Logan City following the local government amalgamations in March 2008.

== Demographics ==
In the 2016 census, North Maclean had a population of 1,536 people.

In the 2021 census, North Maclean had a population of 1,581 people.

== Education ==
Australian Technology and Agricultural College is a private secondary (10–12) school for boys and girls on the corner of Mount Lindesay Highway and Trace Road (27.7777°S 153.0128°E). The school provides alternative educational pathways for students interested in agricultural and industrial careers. In 2018, the school had an enrolment of 16 students with 3 teachers and 3 non-teaching staff.

There are no mainstream schools in North Maclean. The nearest government primary schools are Greenbank State School in neighbouring Greenbank to the north-west, Park Ridge State School in Park Ridge to the north, Jimboomba State School in Jimboomba to the south-east, and Flagstone State School in Flagstone to the south-west. The nearest government secondary schools are Park Ridge State High School in Park Ridge to the north and Flagstone State Community College in Flagstone to the south-west.

== Amenities ==
There are a number of parks in the area:

- Giesemann Park (27.7610°S 153.0290°E)
- Olson Road Park (27.7652°S 152.9800°E)
- Scottdale Park (27.7797°S 152.9965°E)
- Skerman Park (27.7692°S 152.9814°E)
- Trace Road Park (27.7807°S 153.0155°E)
- Tully Memorial Park (27.7839°S 153.0109°E)

The Tully Memorial Park on the Mount Lindesay Highway on the north bank of the Logan River provides a number of sporting fields. It also has a plaque commemorating the crossing of the Logan River by Patrick Logan in July 1828.

== Facilities ==
The Logan City Council operates the Maclean Cemetery at Scott Lane (27.7720°S 152.9861°E).

== See also ==
- South Maclean which has a shared history
