= Kagaru, Queensland =

Kagaru
- Suburb
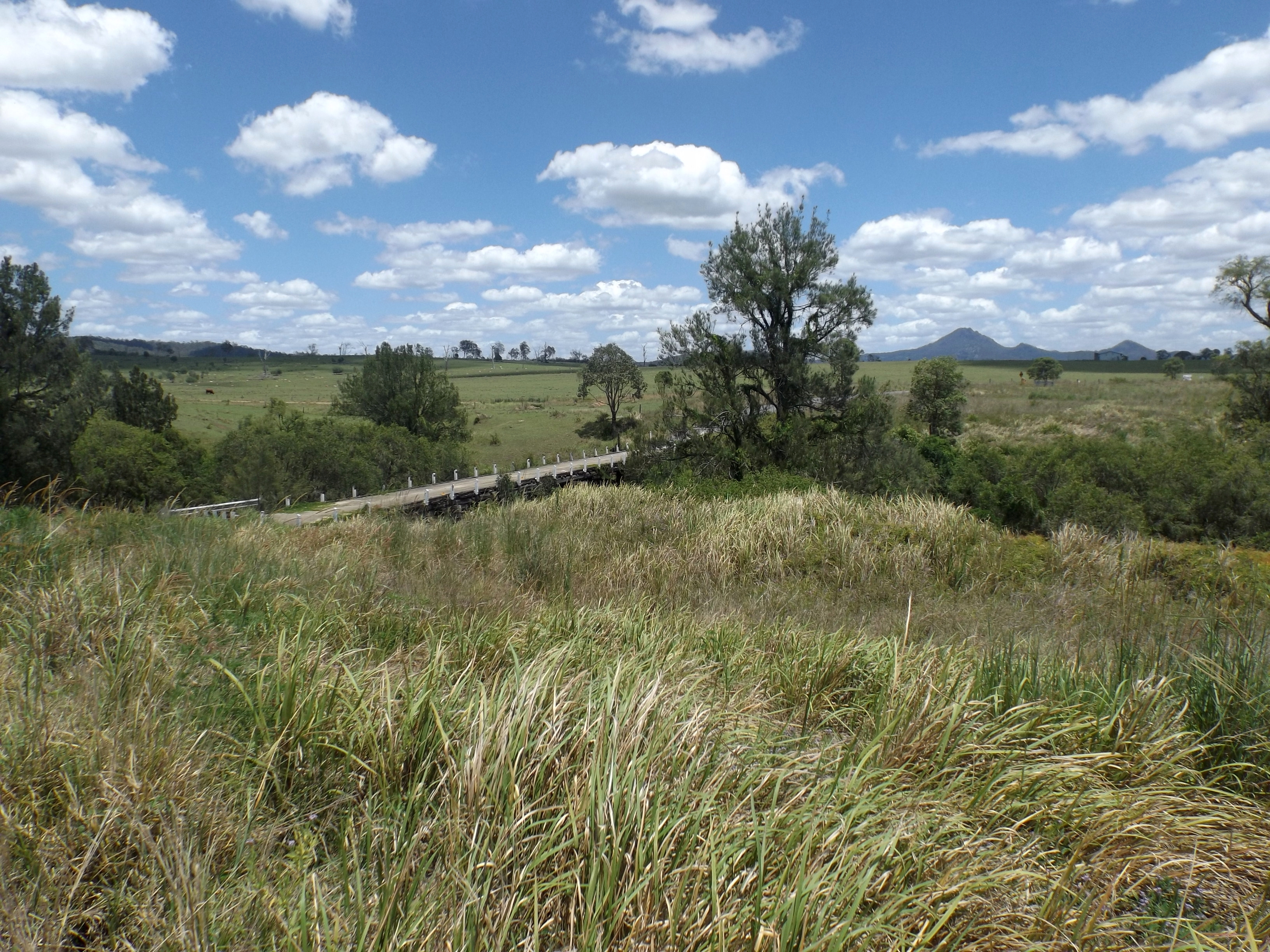
- Teviot Brook crossing, 2016

- Interactive map of Kagaru
- Coordinates: 27.8612°S 152.9109°E
- Country: Australia
- State: Queensland
- LGAs: Scenic Rim Region; City of Logan
- Location: 10.7 km (6.6 mi) SW of Flagstone; 21.8 km (13.5 mi) NNW of Beaudesert; 39.4 km (24.5 mi) SW of Logan Central; 60.5 km (37.6 mi) SSW of Brisbane CBD
- Established: 1997

Government
  - State electorates: Scenic Rim; Jordan
  - Federal division: Wright

Area
  - Total: 29.0 km^{2} (11.2 sq mi)

Population
  - Total: 19 (2021 census)
  - Density: 0.655/km^{2} (1.70/sq mi)
- Time zone: UTC+10:00 (AEST)
- Postcode: 4285
Suburbs around Kagaru
| Flinders Lakes | Monarch Glen | Flagstone; Riverbend |
| Undullah | Kagaru | Cedar Grove |
| Wyaralong | Allenview | Woodhill |

Kagaru is a rural locality split between Scenic Rim Region and City of Logan, Queensland, Australia. In the 2021 census, Kagaru had a population of 19 people.

== Geography ==
Kagaru's eastern border follows the Sydney–Brisbane rail corridor, the Logan River and Teviot Brook.

In the 1930s, a railway station in the area was named Kagaru, a Ugarapul word for the blue-winged kookaburra. On the 24 April 1997, the locality was formally bounded and took the name of the railway station. Formerly in the Shire of Beaudesert, Kagaru became split between Logan City and Scenic Rim Region following the local government amalgamations in March 2008.

The land use is mostly grazing on native vegetation with crop growing also occurring in the northern part of the loacality.

== History ==
The name Kagaru is an Aboriginal word for the blue-winged kookaburra (Dacelo leachii) in the Yuggera language, Yugarabul dialect.

In September 1930, a new railway line from South Brisbane to Kyogle (New South Wales) was opened as part of establishing a faster rail route between Brisbane to Sydney avoiding the break-of-gauge that occurred at Wallangarra on the Queensland-New South Wales border. The new line cut six hours from the journey from Brisbane to Sydney. Kagaru railway station (27.8602°S 152.9235°E) was built to enable the steam locomotives to take on water, but is not in use any more. It was named by the Queensland Railways Department on 14 February 1930. The railway station is now abandoned.

== Demographics ==
In the 2016 census, Kagaru had a population of 13 people. The locality contains 6 households, in which 45.0% of the population are males and 55.0% of the population are females with a median age of 57, 19 years above the national average. The average weekly household income is $1,375, $63 below the national average.

In the 2021 census, Kagaru had a population of 19 people.

== Education ==
There are no schools in Kagaru. The nearest government primary schools are Flagstone State School in neighbouring Flagstone to the north-east, Woodhill State School in neighbouring Woodhill to the south-east, and Gleneagle State School in Gleneagle to the south-east. The nearest government secondary schools are Flagstone State Community College, also in Flagstone, and Beaudesert State High School in Beaudesert to the south-east.

There are also Catholic schools in Flagstone and Beaudesert.
