= South Maclean, Queensland =

South Maclean
- Suburb
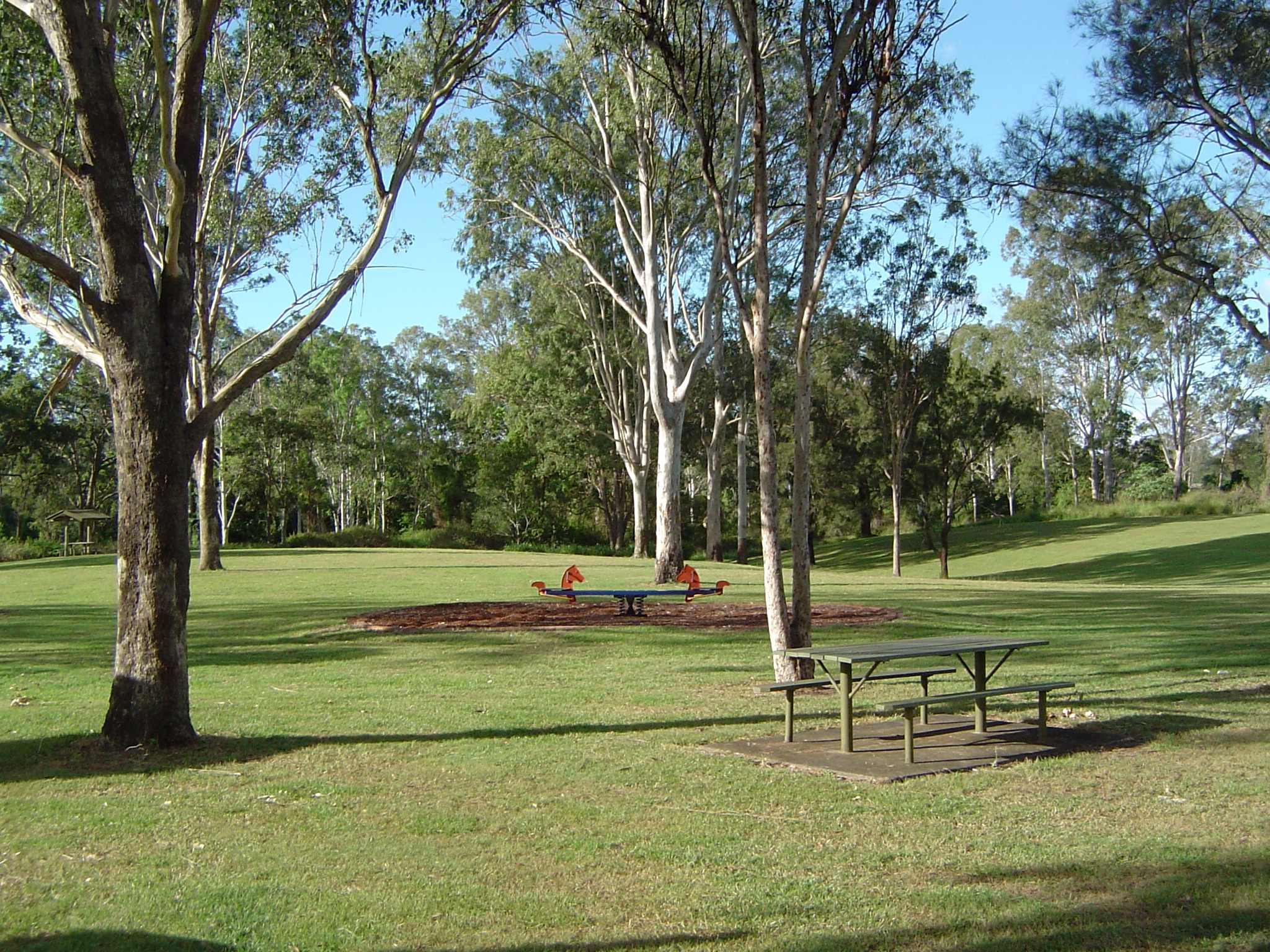
- Maclean Park, 2014

- Interactive map of South Maclean
- Coordinates: 27.7972°S 152.9922°E
- Country: Australia
- State: Queensland
- LGA: Logan City
- Location: 5.4 km (3.4 mi) NE of Flagstone; 18.0 km (11.2 mi) W of Yarrabilba; 27.4 km (17.0 mi) SW of Logan Central; 42.8 km (26.6 mi) SSW of Brisbane CBD

Government
  - State electorate: Logan
  - Federal division: Wright

Area
  - Total: 19.5 km^{2} (7.5 sq mi)

Population
  - Total: 2,232 (2021 census)
  - Density: 114.5/km^{2} (296.5/sq mi)
- Time zone: UTC+10:00 (AEST)
- Postcode: 4280
Suburbs around South Maclean
New Beith	North Maclean	Stockleigh
New Beith	South Maclean	Jimboomba
Flagstone	Riverbend	Jimboomba

South Maclean is a rural locality in the City of Logan, Queensland, Australia. In the 2021 census, South Maclean had a population of 2,232 people.

== Geography ==
North Maclean is on the Mount Lindesay Highway with the Logan River as part of its northern and southern boundaries as well as passing through the locality. North Maclean is immediately to the north of South Maclean. A small section of South Maclean's western border aligns with the Sydney–Brisbane rail corridor.

== History ==
In 1997, the locality of Maclean was replaced by North and South Maclean; prior to this date, they have shared history.

Formerly in the Shire of Beaudesert, South Maclean became part of Logan City following the local government amalgamations in March 2008.

On 29 September 2017, South Maclean was extended eastward taking land from the west of Jimboomba as part of creating the new localities of Riverbend and Glenlogan.

== Demographics ==
In the 2011 census, South Maclean had a population of 1,255.

In the 2016 census, South Maclean had a population of 1,362 people.

In the 2021 census, South Maclean had a population of 2,232 people.

== Education ==
There are no schools in South Maclean. The nearest government primary schools are Flagstone State School in neighbouring Flagstone to the south-west, Jimboomba State School in neighbouring Jimboomba to the south-east, and Everleigh State School in Greenbank to the north. The nearest government secondary schools are Flagstone State Community College in Flagstone, Yarrabilba State Secondary College in Yarrabilba to the east, and Park Ridge State High School in Parkridge to the north.

== See also ==
- North Maclean which has a shared history
