= Glenlogan, Queensland =

Glenlogan
- Suburb
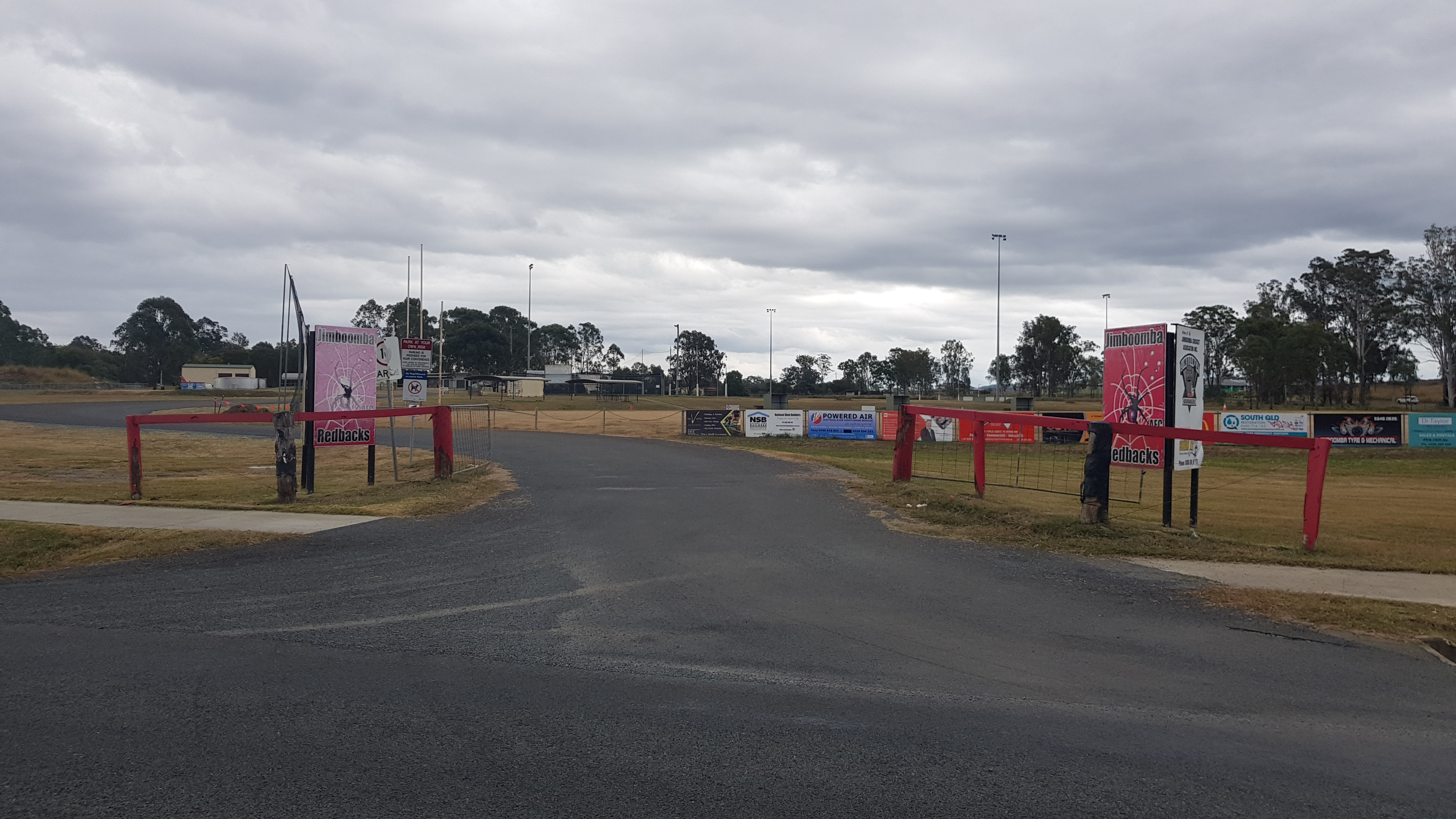
- Glenlogan Park, 2023

- Interactive map of Glenlogan
- Coordinates: 27.8341°S 153.0025°E
- Country: Australia
- State: Queensland
- City: Logan City
- LGA: Logan City
- Location: 2.4 km (1.5 mi) W of Jimboomba; 8.0 km (5.0 mi) SE of Flagstone; 31.6 km (19.6 mi) SW of Logan Central; 50.8 km (31.6 mi) S of Brisbane CBD
- Established: 2017

Government
  - State electorate: Jordan
  - Federal division: Wright

Area
  - Total: 6.7 km^{2} (2.6 sq mi)

Population
  - Total: 1,122 (2021 census)
  - Density: 167.5/km^{2} (434/sq mi)
- Time zone: UTC+10:00 (AEST)
- Postcode: 4280
Suburbs around Glenlogan
| Riverbend | Riverbend | Jimboomba |
| Riverbend | Glenlogan | Jimboomba |
| Cedar Grove | Cedar Grove | Jimboomba |

Glenlogan is a rural locality in the City of Logan, Queensland, Australia. It is part of the suburban development corridor south of Brisbane in the Greater Flagstone development area. In the 2021 census, Glenlogan had a population of 1,122 people.

== Geography ==
The Logan River forms the western and north-western boundaries. The Sydney–Brisbane rail corridor follows the south-eastern boundary.

Mount Lindesay Highway passes to the east.

== History ==
Glenlogan is situated in the Bundjalung traditional Indigenous Australian country.

The locality takes its name from the former Glenlogan Park thoroughbred stud farm on Lance Road. Glenlogan was designated a locality within the Logan City by the Department of Natural Resources and Mines in September 2017. It was excised from land formerly in Jimboomba.

== Demographics ==
In the 2021 census, Glenlogan had a population of 1,122 people.

== Education ==
There are no schools in Glenlogan. The nearest government primary school is Jimboomba State School in neighbouring Jimboomba to the east. The nearest government secondary school is Flagstone State Community College in Flagstone to the north-west.
