= Cedar Grove, Queensland =

Cedar Grove
- Suburb
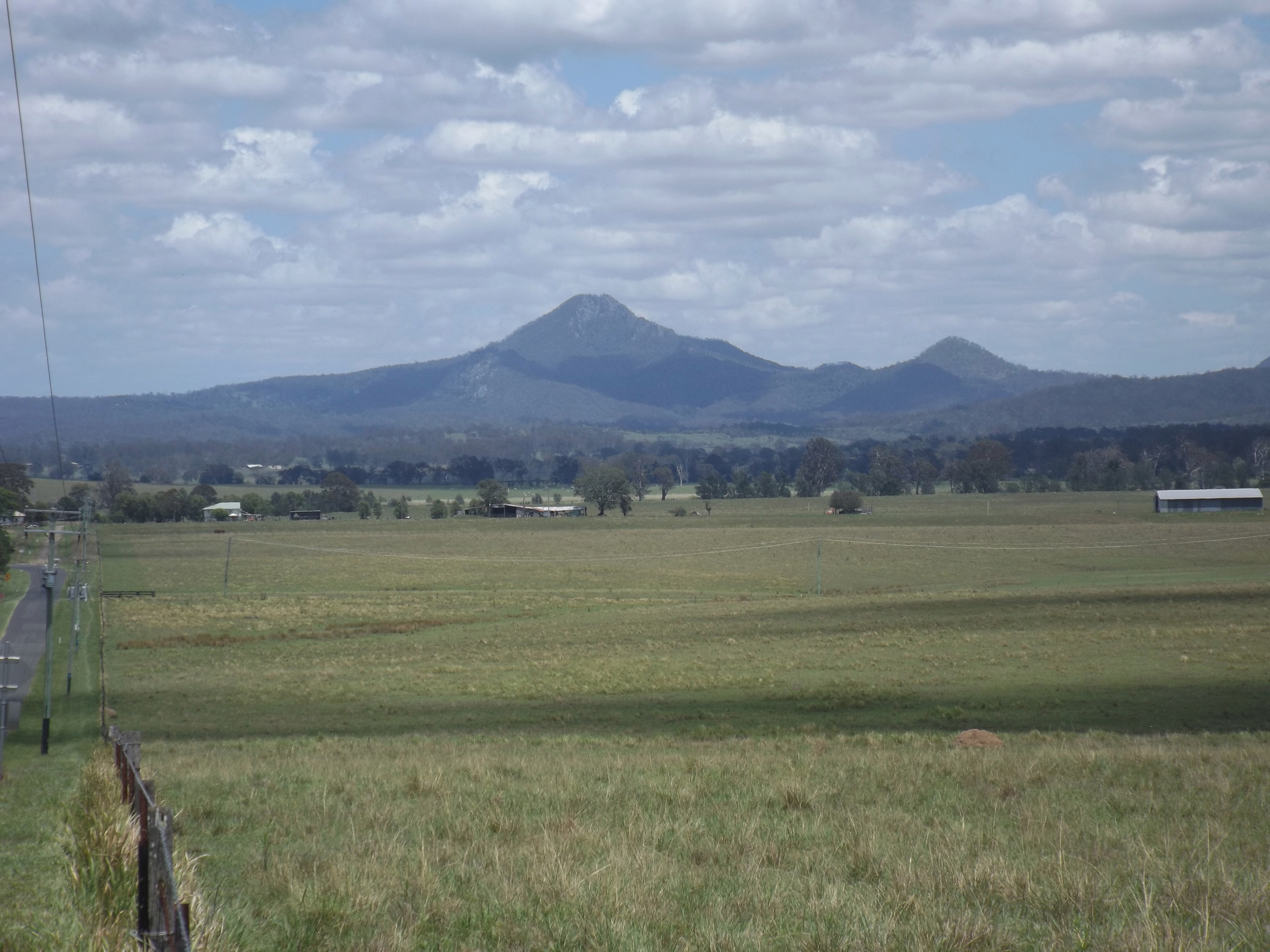
- Flinders Peak from Cedar Grove, 2016

- Interactive map of Cedar Grove
- Coordinates: 27.8600°S 152.9744°E
- Country: Australia
- State: Queensland
- City: Logan City
- LGA: Logan City
- Location: 36.4 km (22.6 mi) SW of Logan Central; 55.4 km (34.4 mi) S of Brisbane CBD

Government
  - State electorate: Scenic Rim
  - Federal division: Wright

Area
  - Total: 18.0 km^{2} (6.9 sq mi)

Population
  - Total: 1,992 (2021 census)
  - Density: 110.7/km^{2} (286.6/sq mi)
- Time zone: UTC+10:00 (AEST)
- Postcode: 4285
Suburbs around Cedar Grove
| Riverbend | Riverbend | Glenlogan |
| Kagaru | Cedar Grove | Jimboomba |
| Allenview | Woodhill | Cedar Vale |

Cedar Grove is a mixed-use locality in the City of Logan, Queensland, Australia. In the 2021 census, Cedar Grove had a population of 1,992 people.

== Geography ==
The western and part of the northern boundary of Cedar Grove follows the Logan River. On the river on the northern boundary is the Cedar Grove Weir. The Mount Lindesay Highway loosely forms the eastern boundary of the locality.

The eastern edge of the locality and the west of the locality are used for agriculture, a mixture of grazing on native vegetation and crop growing. A strip through the centre of the locality between the eastern and western agricultural areas is residential.

== History ==
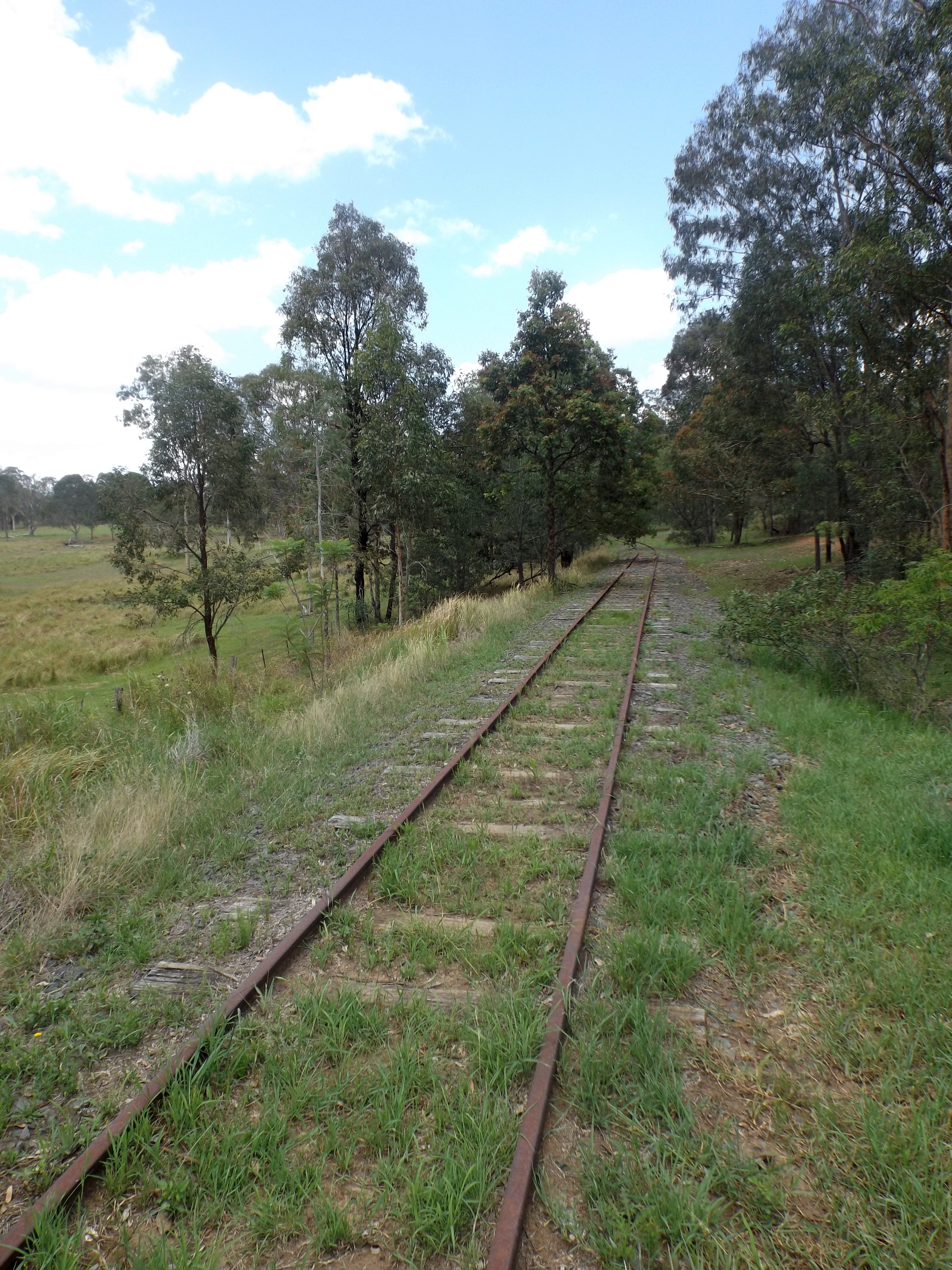
Disused Beaudesert railway line, 2016

Cedar Grove railway station (27.8617°S 152.991944°E) was on the disused Beaudesert railway line from Bethania to Beaudesert. The line opened on 16 May 1888. When the railway line to Beaudesert was built in 1888, the station was built in the area known as Cedar Pocket. The station appears on an 1888 map as Cedar Pocket South railway station.

Jimboomba Timber Reserve Provisional School opened circa 1899. In 1906, it was renamed Martindale Provisional School. On 1 January 1909, it became Martindale State School. It was in the area of Gittins Road (now in Riverbend). It closed in 1922. The school building was then relocated to 19-29 Cedar Grove Road (27.8622°S 152.9975°E), where it opened as Cedar Grove State School in 1923. It closed in 1965.

The Cedar Grove Weir on the Logan River was built between March 2007 and January 2008. It supplies water into the South East Queensland Water Grid.

Formerly in the Shire of Beaudesert, Cedar Grove became part of Logan City following the local government amalgamations in March 2008.

== Demographics ==
In the 2011 census, Cedar Grove had a population of 2,020 people.

In the 2016 census, Cedar Grove had a population of 2,041 people.

In the 2021 census, Cedar Grove had a population of 1,992 people.

== Education ==
There are no schools in Cedar Grove. The nearest government primary school is Woodhill State School in neighbouring Woodhill to the south. The nearest government secondary schools are Flagstone State Community College in Flagstone to the north and Beaudesert State High School in Beaudesert to the south.
