= Riverbend, Queensland =

Riverbend
- Suburb
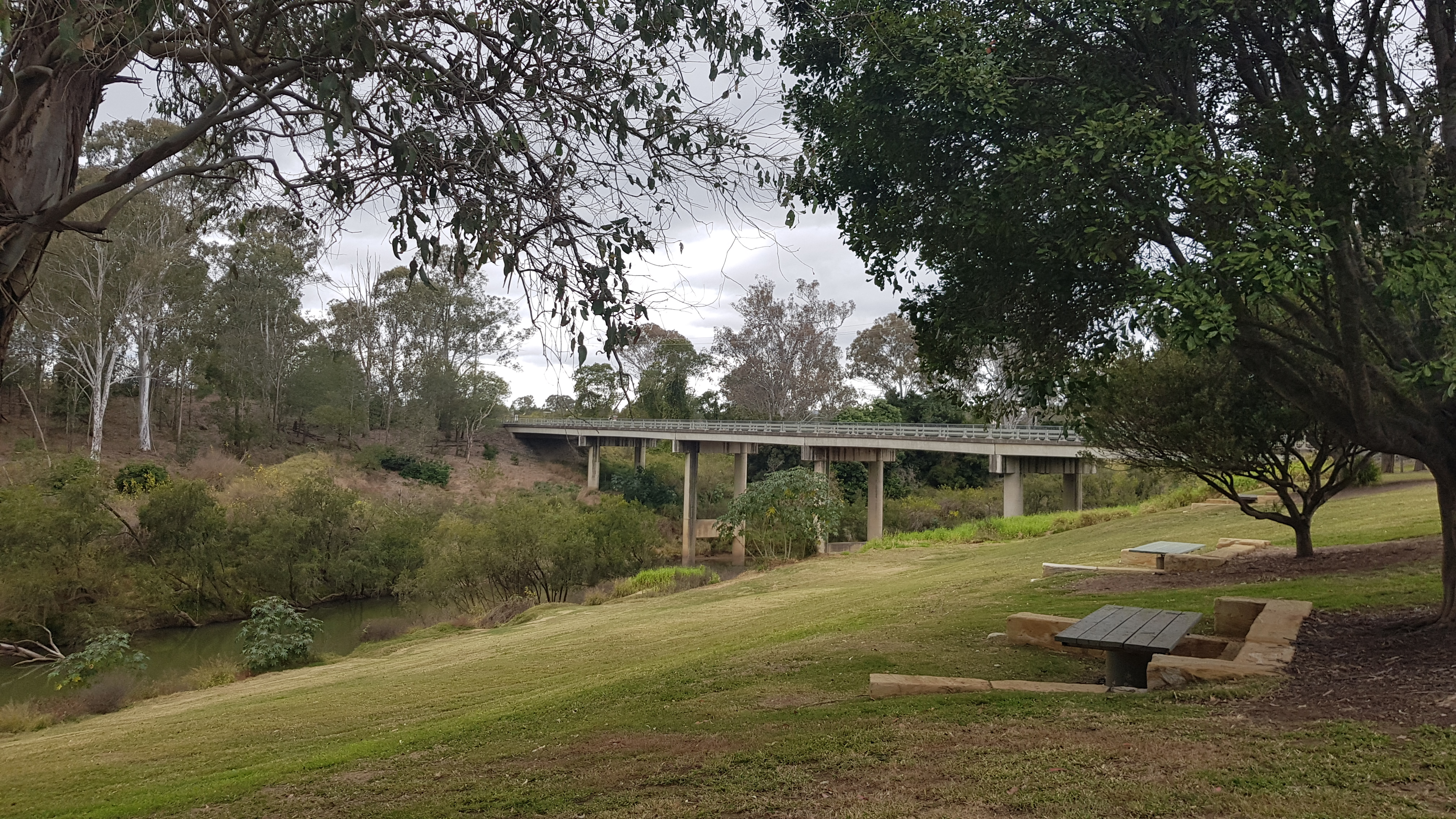
- Lions Riverside Park, 2023

- Interactive map of Riverbend
- Coordinates: 27.8277°S 152.9722°E
- Country: Australia
- State: Queensland
- City: Logan City
- LGA: Logan City
- Location: 2.9 km (1.8 mi) SE of Flagstone; 6.0 km (3.7 mi) WNW of Jimboomba; 31.2 km (19.4 mi) SSW of Logan Central; 50.2 km (31.2 mi) S of Brisbane CBD
- Established: 2017

Government
  - State electorate: Logan
  - Federal division: Wright

Area
  - Total: 16.0 km^{2} (6.2 sq mi)

Population
  - Total: 661 (2021 census)
  - Density: 41.31/km^{2} (107.0/sq mi)
- Time zone: UTC+10:00 (AEST)
- Postcode: 4280
Suburbs around Riverbend
Flagstone	South Maclean	South Maclean
Flagstone	Riverbend	Jimboomba
Monarch Glen; Kagaru	Cedar Grove	Glenlogan

Riverbend is a rural locality in the City of Logan, Queensland, Australia. Designated as a separate locality in 2017, it will be progressively developed for residential use as the population of the city grows. In the 2021 census, Riverbend had a population of 661 people.

== Geography ==
Riverbend is situated along the development corridor south of Brisbane in the Greater Flagstone development area. The locality takes its name from the bend in the Logan River on the southern boundary of the suburb.

On the river on the southern boundary is the Cedar Grove Weir.

== History ==
Riverbend is situated in the Bundjalung traditional Indigenous Australian country.

Jimboomba Timber Reserve Provisional School opened circa 1899. In 1906, it was renamed Martindale Provisional School. On 1 January 1909, it became Martindale State School. It was in the area of Gittins Road (approx 27.8340°S 152.9541°E). It closed in 1922. The school building was then relocated to Cedar Grove, where it opened as Cedar Grove State School in 1923 and closed in 1965.

Riverbend was approved and designated as a locality within Logan City by the Department of Natural Resources and Mines in September 2017. It was excised from land formerly in Jimboomba.

== Demographics ==
In the 2021 census, Riverbend had a population of 661 people. This was the first census for Riverbend.

== Education ==
There are no schools in Riverbend. The nearest government primary schools are Flagstone State School in neighbouring Flagstone to the north-west and Jimboomba State School in neighbouring Jimboomba to the east. The nearest government secondary school is Flagstone State Community College in Flagstone.
