= Flinders Lakes, Queensland =

Flinders Lakes
- Suburb
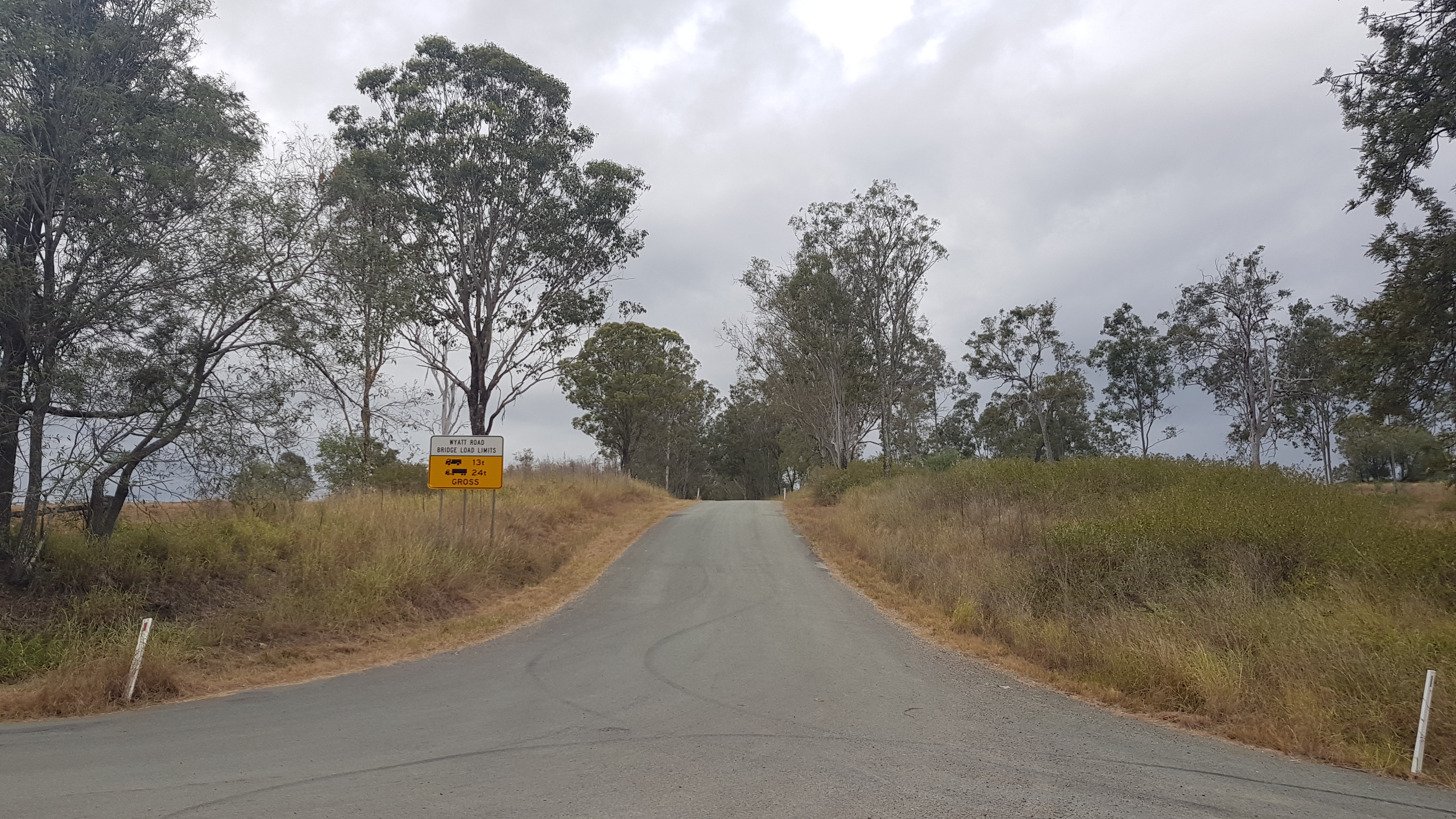
- Wyatt Road, 2023

- Interactive map of Flinders Lakes
- Coordinates: 27.8291°S 152.8888°E
- Country: Australia
- State: Queensland
- City: Logan City
- LGA: Logan City
- Location: 10.3 km (6.4 mi) SW of Flagstone; 34.2 km (21.3 mi) SE of Ipswich; 39.1 km (24.3 mi) SW of Logan Central; 58.2 km (36.2 mi) SW of Brisbane CBD

Government
  - State electorate: Jordan
  - Federal division: Wright

Area
  - Total: 11.9 km^{2} (4.6 sq mi)
- Time zone: UTC+10:00 (AEST)
- Postcode: 4285
Suburbs around Flinders Lakes
Undullah	Undullah	Undullah
Undullah	Flinders Lakes	Monarch Glen
Undullah	Kagaru	Kagaru

Flinders Lakes is a rural locality in the City of Logan, Queensland, Australia. It is situated along the development corridor south of Brisbane in the Greater Flagstone development area and is one of four new suburbs that have been created in Logan to house a predicted population boom between Brisbane and the Gold Coast.

== Geography ==
Flinders Lakes is located at the most southerly point of the City of Logan.

== History ==
Flinders Lakes is situated in the Bundjalung traditional Indigenous Australian country. The origin of the locality name is based upon the views of nearby Flinders Peak. It was designated as a locality within Logan City by the Department of Natural Resources and Mines on 20 May 2016. The redistribution of the state's electoral boundaries in 2017 led to the suburb being part of the Jordan electoral district.

== Demographics ==
The population of Flinders Lakes was not separately reported in the 2021 Australian census. It was included in the census data for its neighbouring locality Undullah.

== Future plans ==
Planned development in Flinders Lakes includes a mixed-use zoned central area, residential, parks and recreation, and knowledge-based industries and services focusing on health, education, tourism and agriculture.

Planned transportation projects that would service Flinders Lakes and the Greater Flagstone development areas include passenger railway links between Salisbury and Beaudesert.

== Education ==
There are no schools in Flinders Lake. The nearest government primary schools are Flagstone State School in Flagstone to the east and Ripley Valley State School in South Ripley to the north-west. The nearest government secondary schools are Flagstone State Community College in Flagstone and Ripley Valley State Secondary College in South Ripley.
