= SQA =

SQA may refer to:

- Scottish Qualifications Authority, accrediting educational awards
- Software quality assurance
- Santa Ynez Airport, California, US, IATA code
- Shama language (ISO 639-3 code sqa), a Kainji language of Nigeria
- South Queensland Academy, a former Japanese school in Australia
- Sugar Quota Administration, later Sugar Regulatory Administration, Philippines
- Status quo ante (disambiguation)
