= Silverbark Ridge, Queensland =

Silverbark Ridge
- Suburb
- Interactive map of Silverbark Ridge
- Coordinates: 27.7897°S 152.9233°E
- Country: Australia
- State: Queensland
- City: Logan City
- LGA: Logan City

Government
  - State electorate: Jordan
  - Federal division: Wright

Area
  - Total: 5.3 km^{2} (2.0 sq mi)

Population
  - Total: 0 (2021 census)
  - Density: 0.00/km^{2} (0.00/sq mi)
- Time zone: UTC+10:00 (AEST)
- Postcode: 4124
Suburbs around Silverbark Ridge
New Beith	New Beith	New Beith
Lyons	Silverbark Ridge	Flagstone
Monarch Glen	Monarch Glen	Flagstone

Silverbark Ridge is a rural locality in the City of Logan, Queensland, Australia. It is situated along the development corridor south of Brisbane in the Greater Flagstone development area and is one of four new suburbs in Logan to house a predicted population boom between Brisbane and the Gold Coast. In the 2021 census, Silverbark Ridge had "no people or a very low population".

== Geography ==
Flagstone Creek forms the locality's northern boundary.

As at 2025, the south-east of the locality has been cleared in preparation for housing construction, but there is no road access.he land use of the remainder of the locality is grazing on native vegetation.

== History ==
. Silverbark Ridge is situated in the Bundjalung traditional Indigenous Australian country.

The origin of the suburb name is from the name of the flora found in the district. It was approved and designated as a locality within Logan City by the Department of Natural Resources and Mines on 20 May 2016.

The redistribution of the state's electoral boundaries in 2017 led to the suburb being part of the Jordan electoral district.

== Demographics ==
In the 2021 census, Silverbark Ridge had "no people or a very low population". This is the first census for Silverbark Ridge.

== Education ==
There are no schools in Silverbark Ridge. The nearest government primary school is Flagstone State School in neighbouring Flagstone to the south-east. The nearest government secondary school is Flagstone State Community College, also in Flagstone. There is also a Catholic primary-and-secondary school in Flagstone.
