= New Beith, Queensland =

New Beith
- Suburb
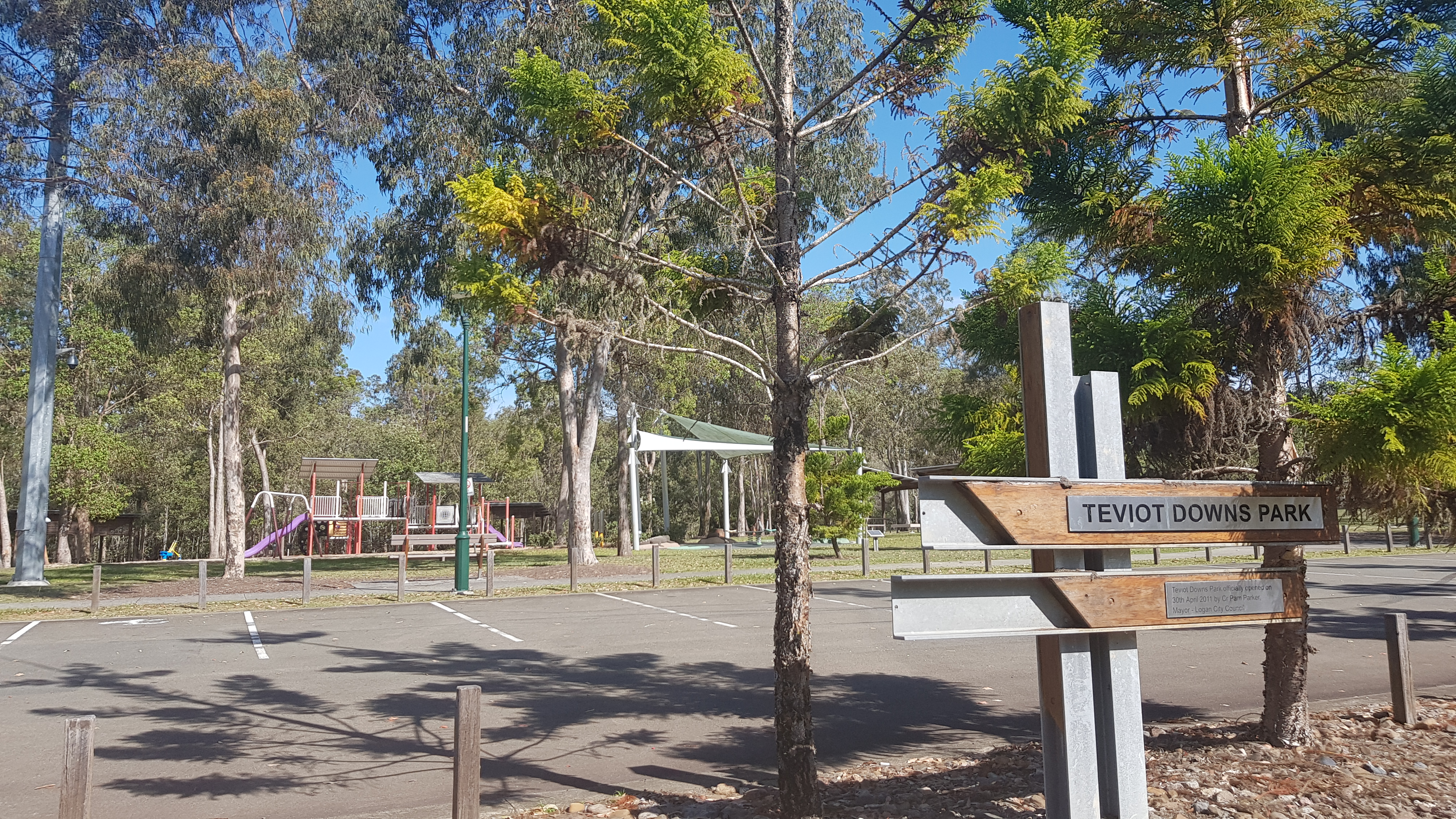
- Teviot Downs Park, 2022

- Interactive map of New Beith
- Coordinates: 27.7638°S 152.9388°E
- Country: Australia
- State: Queensland
- LGA: Logan City
- Location: 17.8 km (11.1 mi) SW of Park Ridge; 24.3 km (15.1 mi) SW of Logan Central; 39.2 km (24.4 mi) SSW of Brisbane CBD

Government
  - State electorate: Jordan
  - Federal division: Wright

Area
  - Total: 28.8 km^{2} (11.1 sq mi)

Population
  - Total: 5,642 (2021 census)
  - Density: 195.9/km^{2} (507.4/sq mi)
- Time zone: UTC+10:00 (AEST)
- Postcode: 4124
Suburbs around New Beith
Greenbank	Greenbank	Greenbank
Lyons	New Beith	North Maclean
Silverbark Ridge	Flagstone	South Maclean

New Beith is a rural residential locality in the City of Logan, Queensland, Australia. In the 2021 census, New Beith had a population of 5,642 people.

== Geography ==
Most of the locality's eastern boundary aligns with the Sydney–Brisbane rail corridor.

Round Mountain is in the south-east of the locality (27.7801°S 152.9479°E) rising to 154 metres (505 ft) above sea level.

The southern and eastern half of New Beith lies within the Logan River catchment while the north and west of New Beith belongs to the Oxley Creek catchment.

The land use is rural residential housing in the north of the locality with grazing on native vegetation and some horticulture in the south of the locality.

== History ==
The name New Beith is a reference to the town of Beith, Ayrshire, Scotland, the home town of Cecelia, wife of Richard Tyson Wilson, an early European settler.

New Beith State School was opened in March 1916 with 18 students and teacher Gladys Heany, but closed on 9 July 1950 as the combined numbers with Greenbank State School were not sufficient to support two schools in the area. It was at 606-610 New Beith Road (27.7425°S 152.9425°E).

Formerly in the Shire of Beaudesert, New Beith became part of Logan City following the local government amalgamations in March 2008.

On 20 May 2016, areas in the south of New Beith were excised to form the new locality of Silverbark Ridge and part of the new locality of Flagstone.

== Demographics ==
In the 2011 census, New Beith recorded a population of 3,446 people; 49.3% females and 50.7% males. The median age of the New Beith population was 32 years, 5 years below the national median of 37. 78.5% of people living in New Beith were born in Australia. The other most frequent responses for country of birth were England 5.5%, New Zealand 3.9%, Poland 0.6%, Scotland 0.5%, Laos 0.5%. 88.2% of people spoke only English at home; the next most common languages were 1.3% Mon-Khmer, nec, 0.8% Hmong, 0.8% Samoan, 0.5% Spanish, 0.4% Polish.

In the 2016 census, New Beith had a population of 4,081 people. The population growth rate between 2011 and 2016 was 18.4%. The median weekly household income was $2,266, higher than the national median of $1,438. New Beith's population steadily rose through 2022, estimated to be about 6,383 people.

In the 2021 census, New Beith had a population of 5,642 people.

== Education ==
There are no schools in New Beith. The nearest government primary school is Greenbank State School in neighbouring Greenbank to the north. The nearest government secondary school is Park Ridge State High School in Park Ridge to the north-west.

== Amenities ==
There is an off-leash dog park at Teviot Downs Park in Bradman Street.
