= Monarch Glen, Queensland =

Monarch Glen
- Suburb
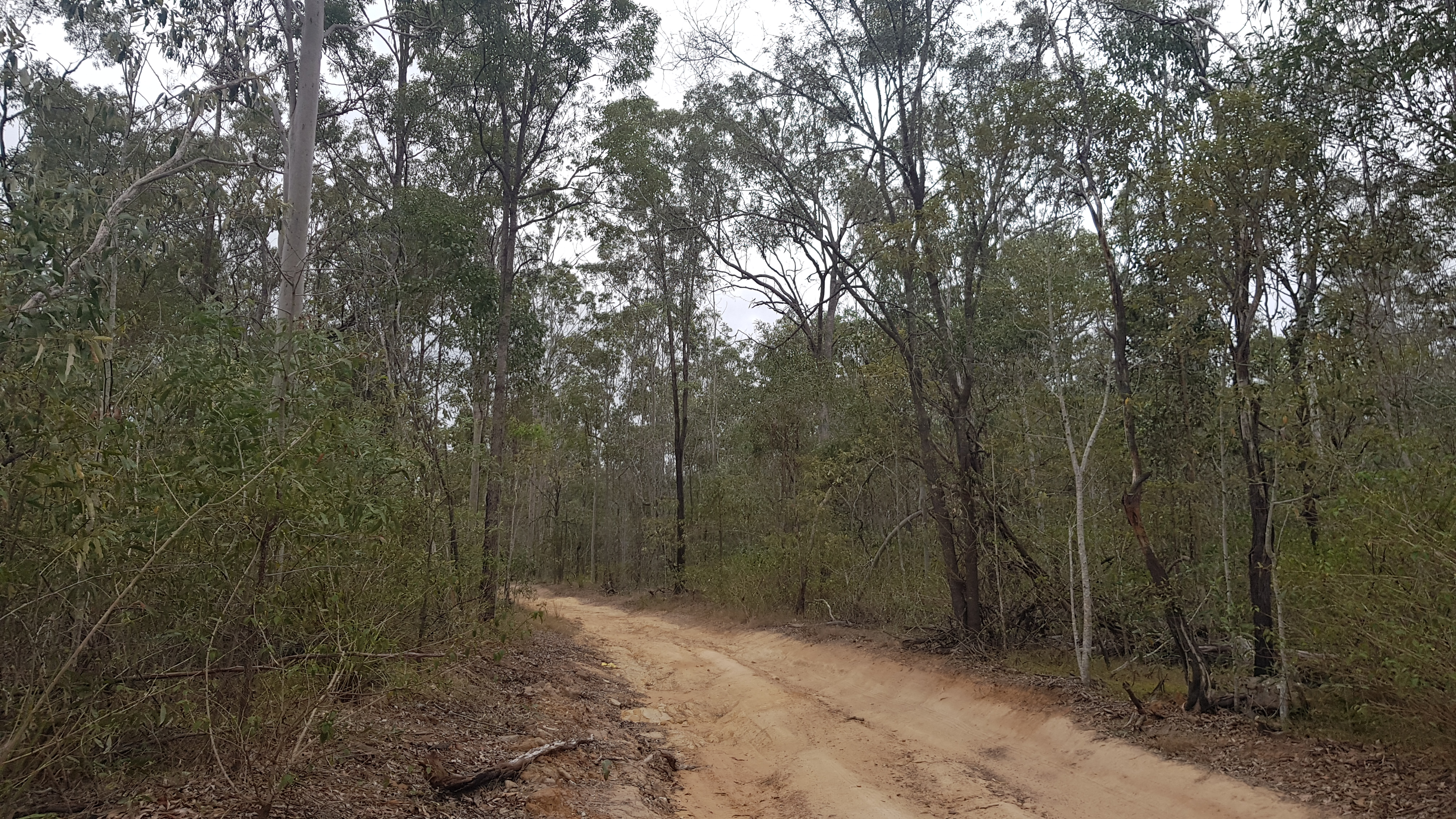
- Bush track, 2023

- Interactive map of Monarch Glen
- Coordinates: 27.8144°S 152.9175°E
- Country: Australia
- State: Queensland
- City: Logan City
- LGA: Logan City
- Location: 10.7 km (6.6 mi) W of Flagstone; 39.5 km (24.5 mi) SW of Logan Central; 60.6 km (37.7 mi) SSW of Brisbane CBD

Government
  - State electorate: Jordan
  - Federal division: Wright

Area
  - Total: 9.7 km^{2} (3.7 sq mi)

Population
  - Total: 0 (2021 census)
  - Density: 0.00/km^{2} (0.00/sq mi)
- Time zone: UTC+10:00 (AEST)
- Postcode: 4285
Suburbs around Monarch Glen
Lyons	Silverbark Ridge	Flagstone
Undullah	Monarch Glen	Flagstone
Flinders Lakes	Flinders Lakes	Riverbend

Monarch Glen is a rural locality in the City of Logan, Queensland, Australia. It is situated along the development corridor south of Brisbane in the Greater Flagstone development area and is one of four new suburbs that have been created in Logan to house a predicted population boom between Brisbane and the Gold Coast. In the 2021 census, Monarch Glen had "no people or a very low population".

== History ==
Monarch Glen is situated in the Bundjalung traditional Indigenous Australian country. The origin of the suburb name is from the monarch butterfly (Danaus plexippus), which is found locally. It was approved and designated as a locality within the Logan City by the Department of Natural Resources and Mines on 20 May 2016. The redistribution of the state’s electoral boundaries in 2017 led to the suburb being part of the Jordan electoral district.

== Demographics ==
In the 2021 census, Monarch Glen had "no people or a very low population".

== Education ==
There are no schools in Monarch Glen. The nearest government primary and secondary schools are Flagstone State School and Flagstone State Community College, both in neighbouring Flagstone to the east. There is also a Catholic primary-and-secondary school in Flagstone.
