= Undullah, Queensland =

Undullah
- Suburb
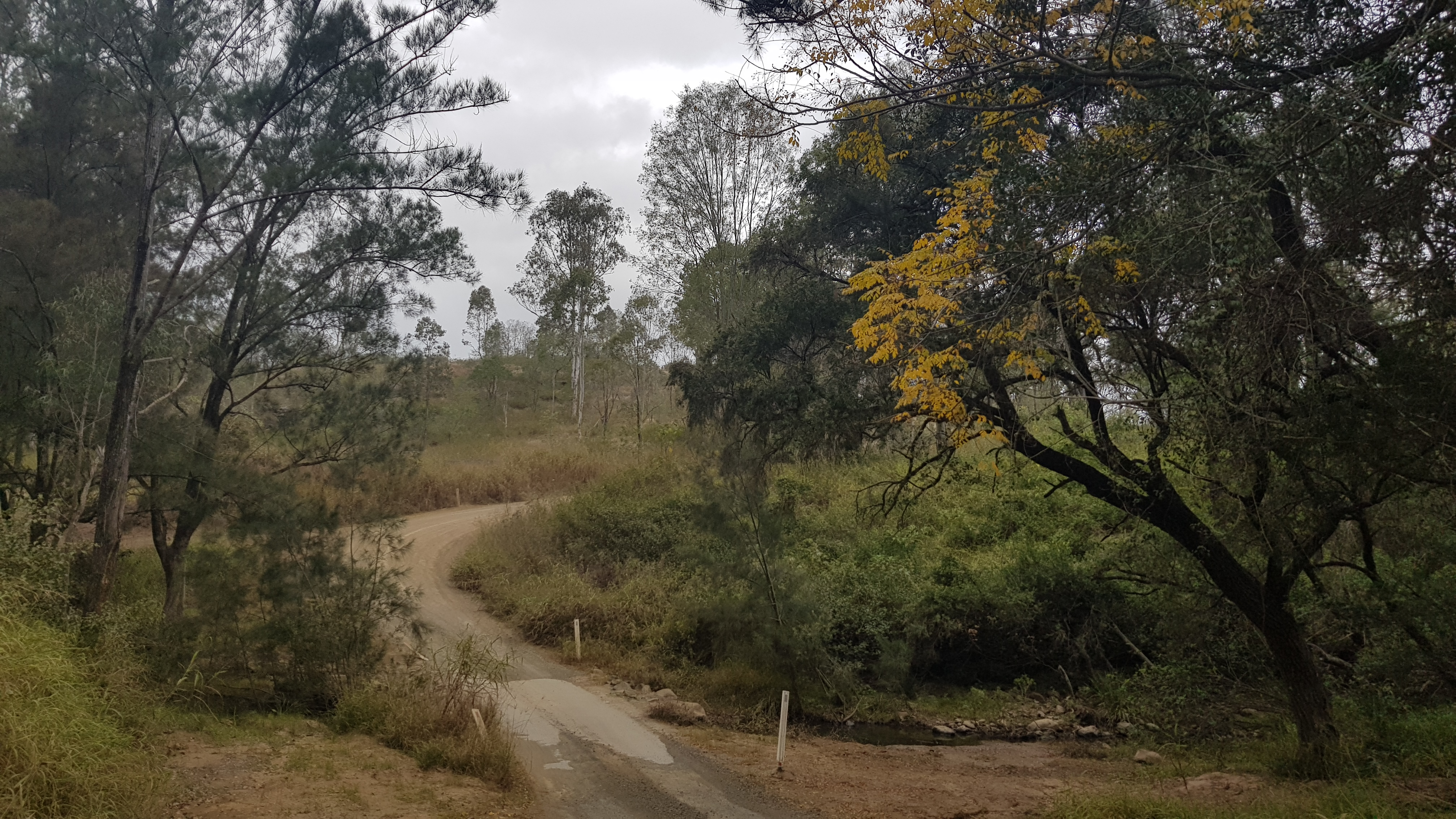
- Undullah Road, 2023

- Interactive map of Undullah
- Coordinates: 27.832°S 152.852°E
- Country: Australia
- State: Queensland
- LGAs: City of Logan; Scenic Rim Region
- Location: 33.0 km (20.5 mi) WSW of Jimboomba; 38.3 km (23.8 mi) NW of Beaudesert; 44.3 km (27.5 mi) SSE of Ipswich; 50.7 km (31.5 mi) SE of Logan Central; 69.7 km (43.3 mi) SW of Brisbane CBD

Government
  - State electorates: Jordan; Scenic Rim
  - Federal division: Wright

Area
  - Total: 93.3 km^{2} (36.0 sq mi)

Population
  - Total: 24 (2021 census)
  - Density: 0.257/km^{2} (0.666/sq mi)
- Time zone: UTC+10:00 (AEST)
- Postcode: 4285
Suburbs around Undullah
Peak Crossing	Lyons	Monarch Glen
Washpool	Undullah	Flinders Lakes
Woolooman	Wyaralong	Kagaru

Undullah is a rural locality split between the City of Logan and the Scenic Rim Region, Queensland, Australia. In the 2021 census, Undullah had a population of 24 people.

== Geography ==
Undullah is dominated by the Flinders Peak Group which rises towards its western boundary. Within the locality are the following mountains (from north to south):

- Mount Elliott (27.8201°S 152.8254°E) 437 metres (1,434 ft)
- Mount Wilbraham (27.8493°S 152.8572°E) 222 metres (728 ft)
- Rocky Knob (27.8842°S 152.8543°E) 222 metres (728 ft)
- Mount Flintoff (27.8863°S 152.8270°E) 354 metres (1,161 ft)
- Mount Joyce (27.9035°S 152.8466°E) 469 metres (1,539 ft)

Woollaman Creek, a tributary of Teviot Brook, is the major waterway in the suburb.

Very little of the area is developed with most of the rangelands covered by bush.

== History ==
The Undullah is believed to be the word nandulla from the Bundjalung and/or Yuggera languages meaning the silver leafed iron bark (eucalyptus melanophloia).

Henry Herbert Elliott was an early settler who raised cattle.

Formerly in the Shire of Beaudesert, Undullah was split between Logan City and Scenic Rim Region following the local government amalgamations in March 2008.

On 20 May 2016, the eastern part of Undullah (within Logan City) was excised to create the new localities of Flinders Lakes and Monarch Glen and part of the new locality of Flagstone.

== Demographics ==
In the 2016 census, Undullah had a population of 45 people.

In the 2021 census, Undullah had a population of 24 people. It included the population of the newly-created locality of Flinders Lakes.

== Education ==
There are no schools in Undullah. The nearest government primary schools are Ripley Valley State School in South Ripley to the north, Flagstone State School in Flagstone to the east, and Peak Crossing State School in Peak Crossing to the west. The nearest government secondary schools are Ripley Valley State Secondary College in South Ripley, Flagstone State Community College in Flagstone, and Bremer State High School in Ipswich to the north-west.
