= Seirinkan High School =

Private high school in Tsushima, Aichi Prefecture, Japan

- 清林館高等学校

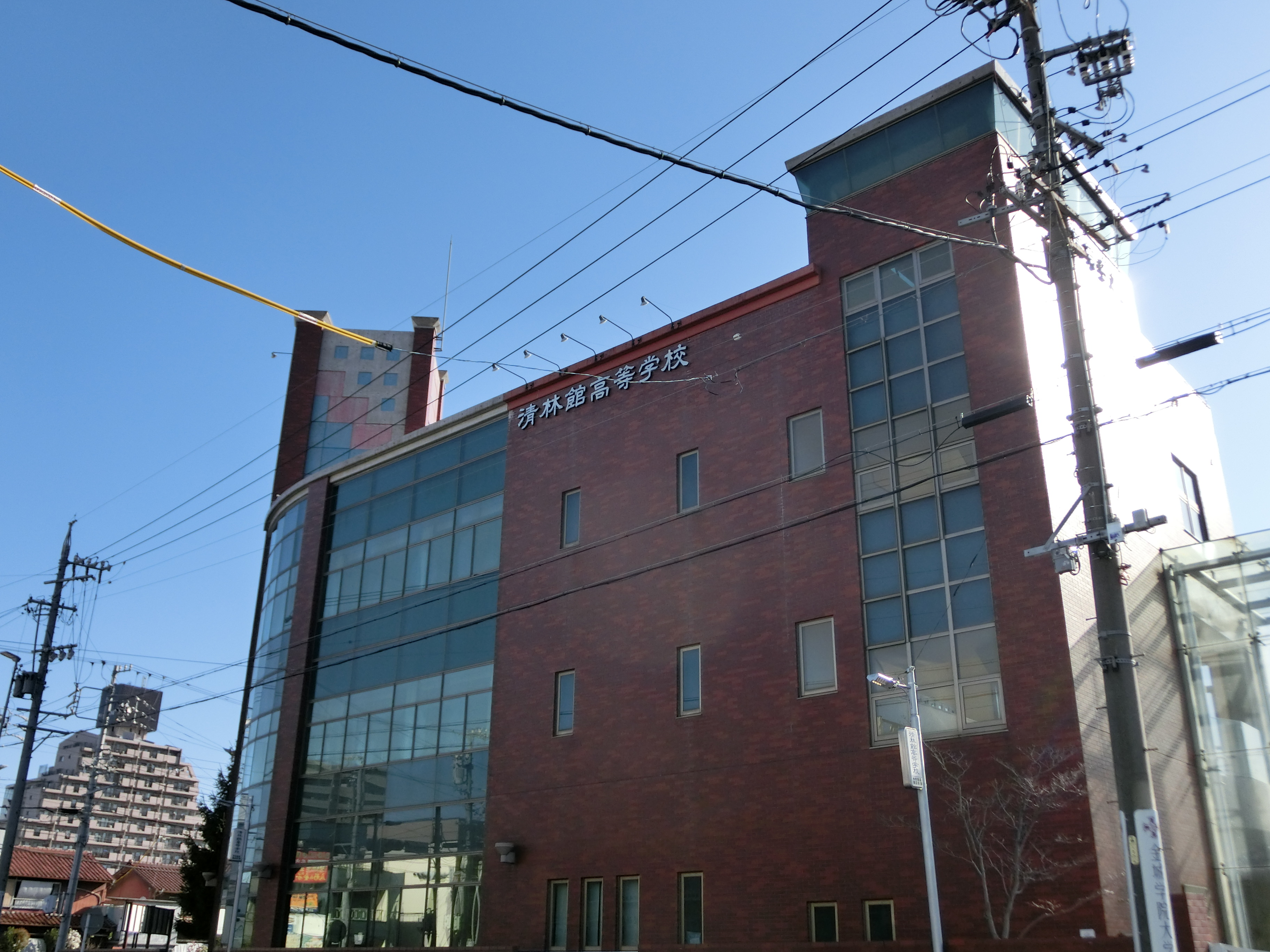
- The former Hommachi campus in Tsushima, photographed in 2016

Location
- 88 Hatchō, Mochinaka-chō; Aisai, Aichi Prefecture, 496-8006; Japan; 35.1831°N 136.7402°E

Information
- Type: Private high school
- Established: 1926; 100 years ago
- Founder: Tetsudo Hirayama
- Grades: 10–12
- Gender: Coeducational
- Language: Japanese
- Website: www.seirinkan.ed.jp/high/

Seirinkan High School (清林館高等学校, Seirinkan Kōtōgakkō) is a private high school located in Aisai, Aichi Prefecture, Japan.

== History ==
The school was founded in 1926 by Tetsudo Hirayama as a girls' sewing school in Tsushima. It became Tsushima Girls' High School in 1948 and adopted the name Seirinkan High School in 2001, when it began admitting boys. All of its general education courses became coeducational in 2003.

In 1992, the school opened South Queensland Academy in Australia as a special sister school. Seirinkan High School moved from Tsushima to its present campus in Aisai in 2018.

== Gallery ==
A Seirinkan High School minibus in Toyohashi in 2025

Another view of the minibus

== See also ==
- South Queensland Academy
