= South Queensland Academy =

- サウスクイーンズランドアカデミー

Location
- Lot 4 Johanna ST., Jimboomba, Queensland 4280 AUSTRALIA; Jimboomba; Australia; 27.8258359°S 153.02565400000003°E

Information
- Type: Private high school (Shiritsu zaigai kyōiku shisetsu)
- Established: 1992
- Closed: 2006
- Website: japan-net.ne.jp/~hirayama/hillshmpg/title.htm

South Queensland Academy (サウスクイーンズランドアカデミー, Sausu Kuīnzurando Akademī; SQA) was a Japanese international school in Jimboomba, Logan City, Queensland. It was an overseas branch of a Japanese private school, or a Shiritsu zaigai kyōiku shisetsu (私立在外教育施設). It was a part of the Hills Educational Foundation, and was associated with the South Queensland International College (SQIC) and Hills Language College (HLC). It was affiliated with Seirinkan High School, and it served the high school level.

The school opened in 1992 (Heisei Year 4). The Japanese Ministry of Education (Monbusho or, today, MEXT) certified the school on 18 December that year. It was decertified by MEXT on 31 March 2013 (Heisei 25). The school closed in 2006 (Heisei 18).

== See also ==
Part-time Japanese schools in Australia

- Canberra Japanese Supplementary School
- Melbourne International School of Japanese
- Japanese Language Supplementary School of Queensland
