= Flagstone, Queensland =

Flagstone
- Suburb
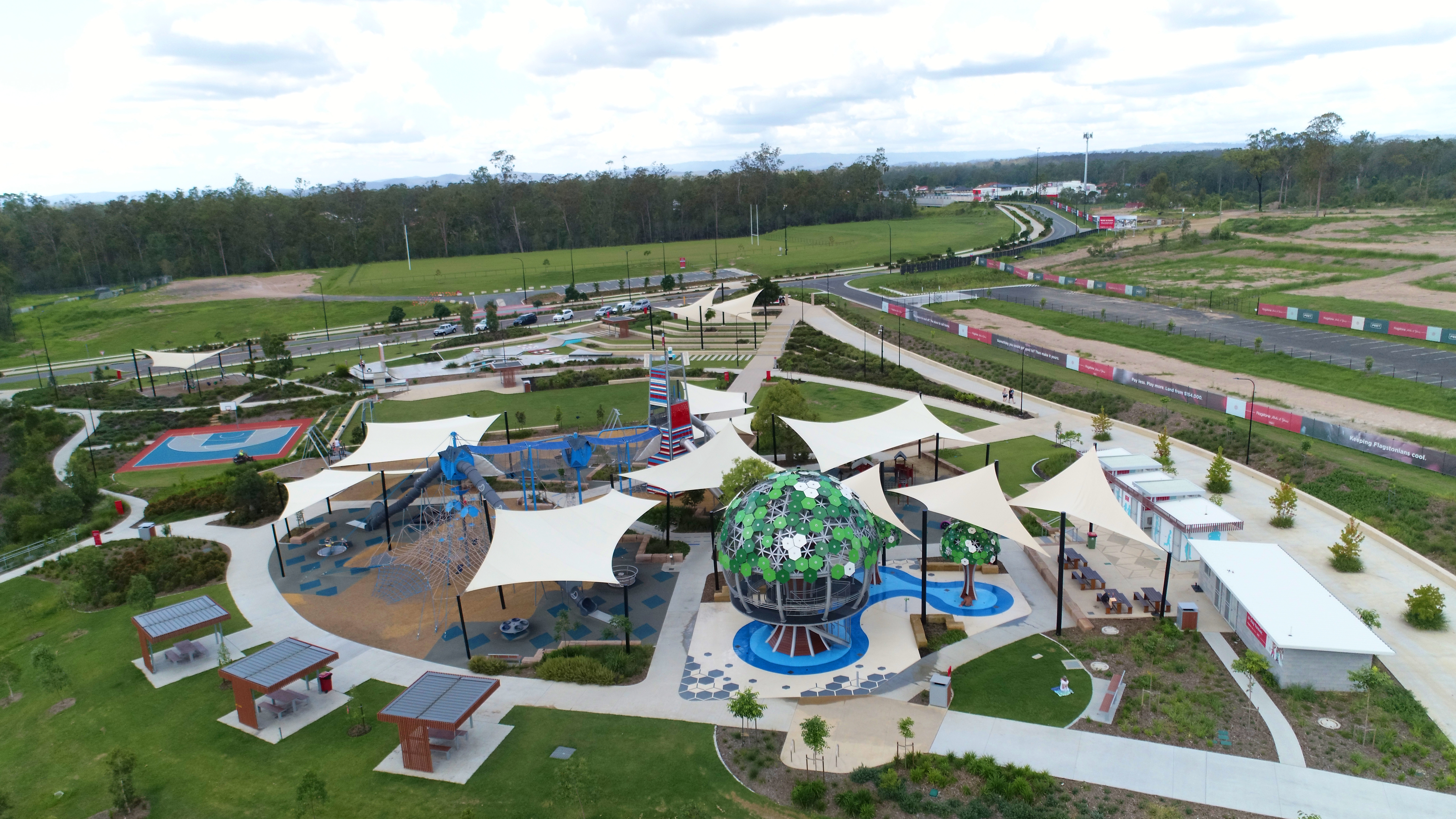
- Homestead Drive, Flagstone

- Interactive map of Flagstone
- Coordinates: 27.8111°S 152.9388°E
- Country: Australia
- State: Queensland
- City: Logan City
- LGA: Logan City
- Location: 31.9 km (19.8 mi) WSW of Logan Central; 50.9 km (31.6 mi) SSW of Brisbane CBD

Government
  - State electorate: Logan
  - Federal division: Wright

Area
  - Total: 14.4 km^{2} (5.6 sq mi)

Population
  - Total: 7,087 (2021 census)
  - Density: 492.2/km^{2} (1,275/sq mi)
- Time zone: UTC+10:00 (AEST)
Suburbs around Flagstone
Silverbark Ridge	New Beith	South Maclean
Monarch Glen	Flagstone	South Maclean
Kagaru	Riverbend	Riverbend

Flagstone is a suburban locality in the Greater Flagstone district of the City of Logan, Queensland, Australia. In the 2021 census, Flagstone had a population of 7,087 people.

== History ==
Flagstone is situated in the Bundjalung traditional Indigenous Australian country. Towards the north of Flagstone is the Yugarabul traditional Indigenous Australian country of the Brisbane and surrounding regions.

The suburb is named after Flagstone Creek which flows into the Logan River just south of Chadwick Drive in South Maclean.

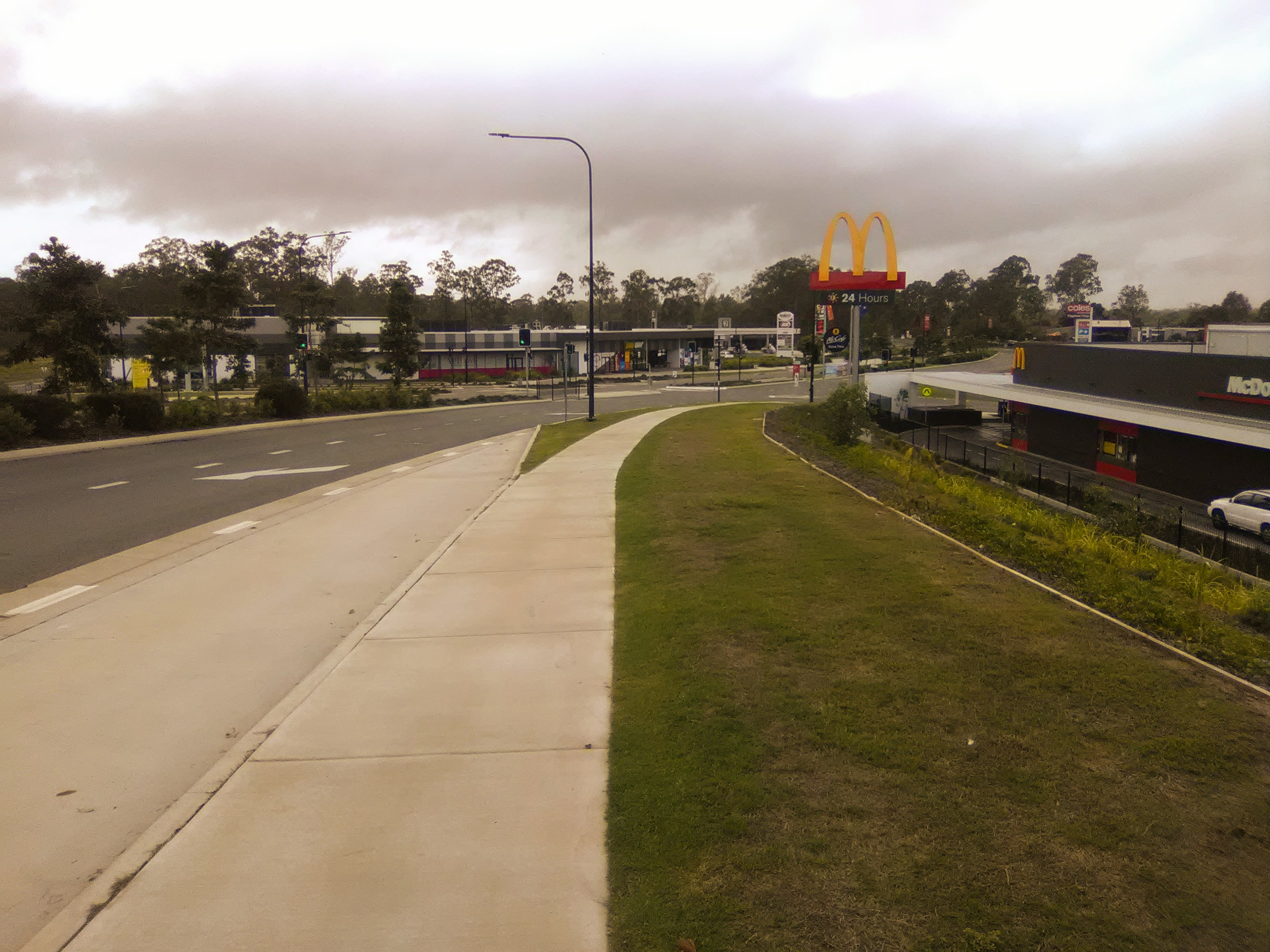
Flagstone Town Centre, Queensland

Suburban development started in Flagstone in 1996, with the development of nearby infrastructure and roads. On 24 April 1997, Flagstone was named by the Minister for Natural Resources as a neighbourhood within the Undullah and Jimboomba areas, though is now a bounded suburb and district in its own right, along with the Greater Flagstone district suburbs and developments of Flinders Lakes, Monarch Glen, Silverbark Ridge, Riverbend and Glenlogan.

Flagstone State School opened on 22 January 1998.

Flagstone State Community College opened on 1 January 2002.

On 8 October 2010, a PDA was declared detailing the expansion and development of Greater Flagstone. Expected to take approximately 30–40 years to complete, the plan is for 50,000 dwellings to house a population of up to 120,000 people.

Development on the west section of the Sydney–Brisbane railway line began post-2011. On 20 May 2016, it was gazetted as a separate locality within the City of Logan.

In late-2018, a large adventure playground was built. The Playground includes an 11m tower, and a skybridge. The project was reported to have cost $12 million.

St Bonaventure's College opened in 2026 initially offering Prep to Year 3 and Year 7, but will expand to an all-years primary and secondary school over time.

== Demographics ==
In 2018, the estimated population of Flagstone was 5,651 people.

In the 2021 census, Flagstone had a population of 7,087 people. This was the first Australian census taken of Flagstone.

== Transport ==
Flagstone is accessible via Teviot Road. Planned transportation links that would service Flagstone, the Greater Flagstone development areas and district includes proposed passenger railway links between Salisbury and Beaudesert.

Flagstone is serviced by public transport buses to and from Browns Plains.

== Facilities ==
The Village Shopping Centre, originally a corner store, was built as early as 2008. Further expansion was planned for late-2019, relaunching as 'Flagstone Central'.

Another shopping centre built on the corner of Homestead and Wild Mint Drive contains: Coles, BWS, hairdressers, health services, Domino's Pizza, Supa IGA, 7-Eleven, Subway, McDonald's, and other specialty stores.

== Education ==
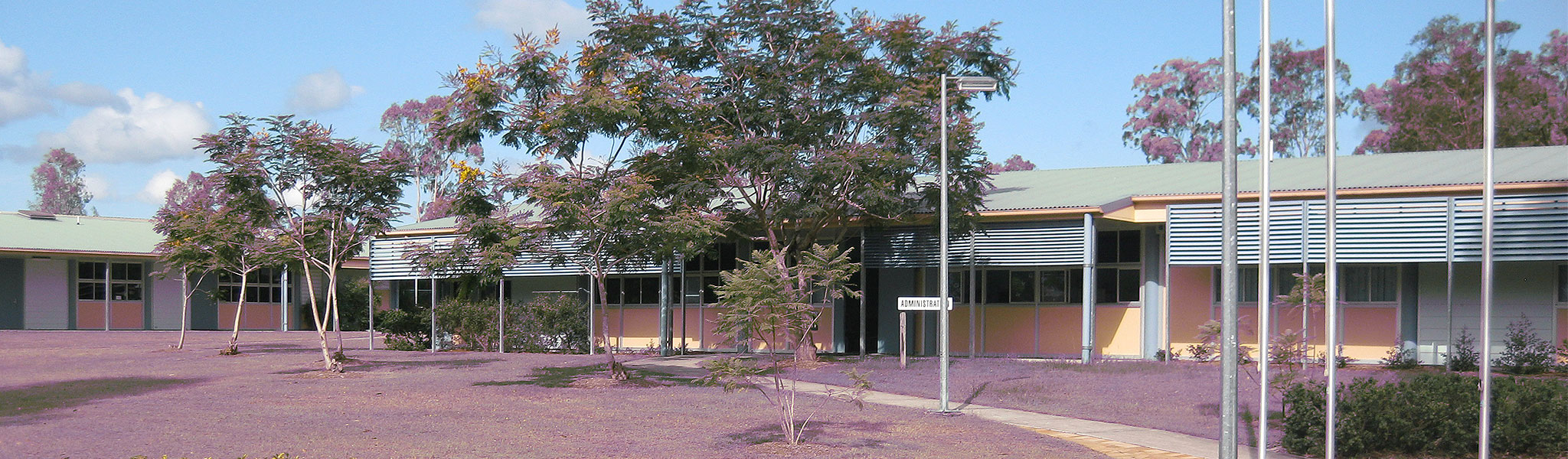
Flagstone State School, 2024

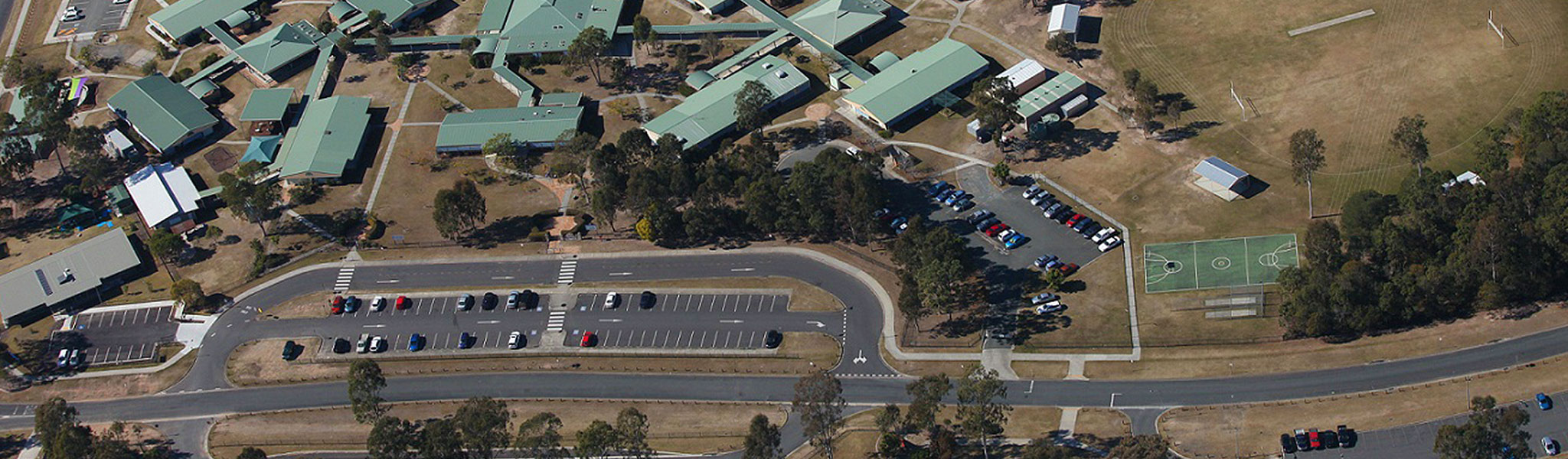
Aerial view of Flagstone State School, 2024

Flagstone State School is a government primary (Prep–6) school for boys and girls at Poinciana Drive (27.8071°S 152.9573°E). In 2017, the school had an enrolment of 696 students with 48 teachers (45 full-time equivalent) and 37 non-teaching staff (23 full-time equivalent).

Flagstone State Community College is a government secondary (7–12) school for boys and girls at the corner of Homestead Drive and Poinciana Drive (27.8072°S 152.9563°E). In 2017, the school had an enrolment of 884 students with 77 teachers (74 full-time equivalent) and 40 non-teaching staff (29 full-time equivalent).

St Bonaventure's College is a Catholic primary-and-secondary (Prep to Year 12) school for boys and girls at 15 College Drive (27.8004°S 152.9480°E). The school opened in 2026 offering Prep to Year 3 and Year 7 initially, but will expand to an all-years primary and secondary school over time. The school is planned to accommodate up to 1,836 students. It is operated by Brisbane Catholic Education.
