= Department of Natural Resources and Mines, Manufacturing and Regional and Rural Development =

Queensland state government department

Department of Natural Resources and Mines, Manufacturing, and Regional and Rural Development
Department overview
- Jurisdiction: Queensland
- Headquarters: 1 William Street, Brisbane
- Minister responsible: Dale Last, Minister for Natural Resources and Mines, Minister for Manufacturing and Minister for Regional and Rural Development
- Website: nrmmrrd.qld.gov.au

The Department of Natural Resources and Mines, Manufacturing, and Regional and Rural Development is a department of the Queensland Government in Australia. The department is responsible for regulating mining, and resources in the state. It was previously called the Department of Resources prior to machinery of government changes in November 2024.

The department's headquarters are at 1 William Street, Brisbane.

== Structure ==
The department is the responsibility of the Minister for Natural Resources and Mines, Minister for Manufacturing and Minister for Regional and Rural Development is Dale Last MP. The department works across three key areas:

- Land and property
- Mining and resources
- Mapping and data

These responsibilities include place naming in Queensland. The department also operates the Museum of Lands, Mapping and Surveying.

== See also ==
- Government of Queensland
- Geological Survey of Queensland
