= Sydney–Brisbane rail corridor =

Sydney–Brisbane railway and associated lines

Coordinates: 28°19′57″S 152°58′04″E

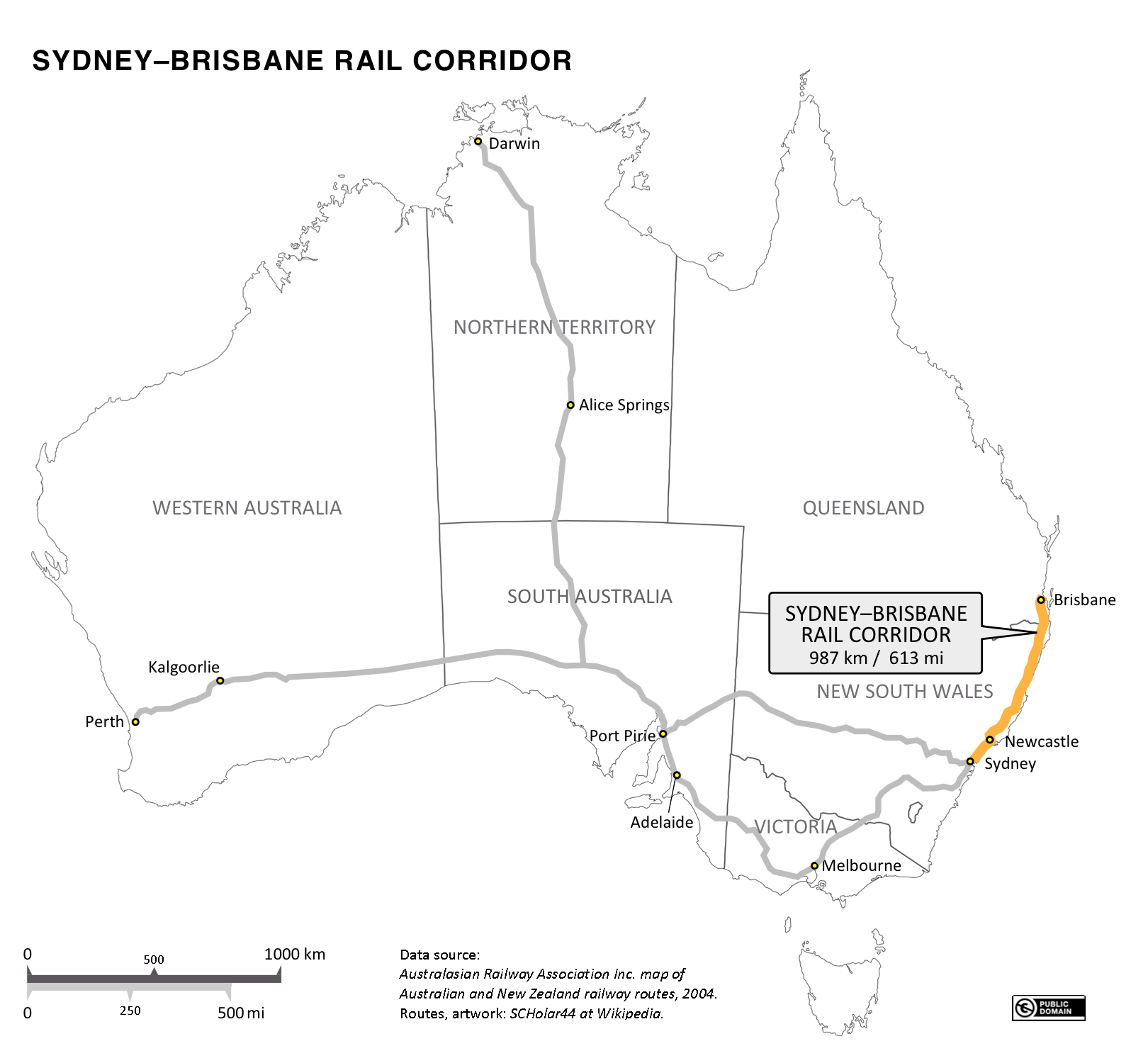
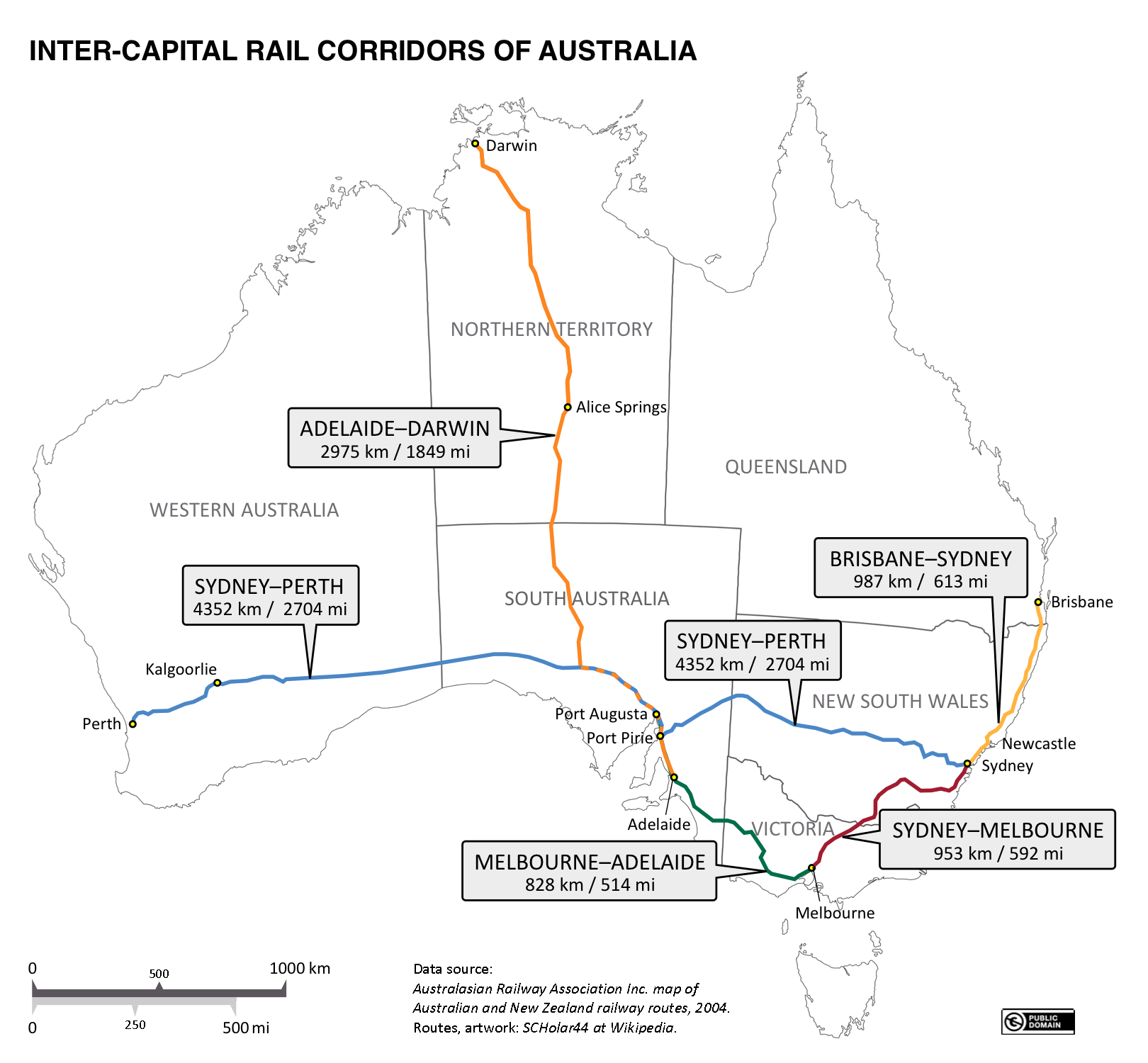

The Sydney–Brisbane railway corridor consists of the 987-kilometre (613-mile) long 1435 mm (4 ft 8 1/2 in) standard-gauge main line between the Australian state capitals of Brisbane (Queensland) and Sydney (New South Wales), and the lines immediately connected to it.

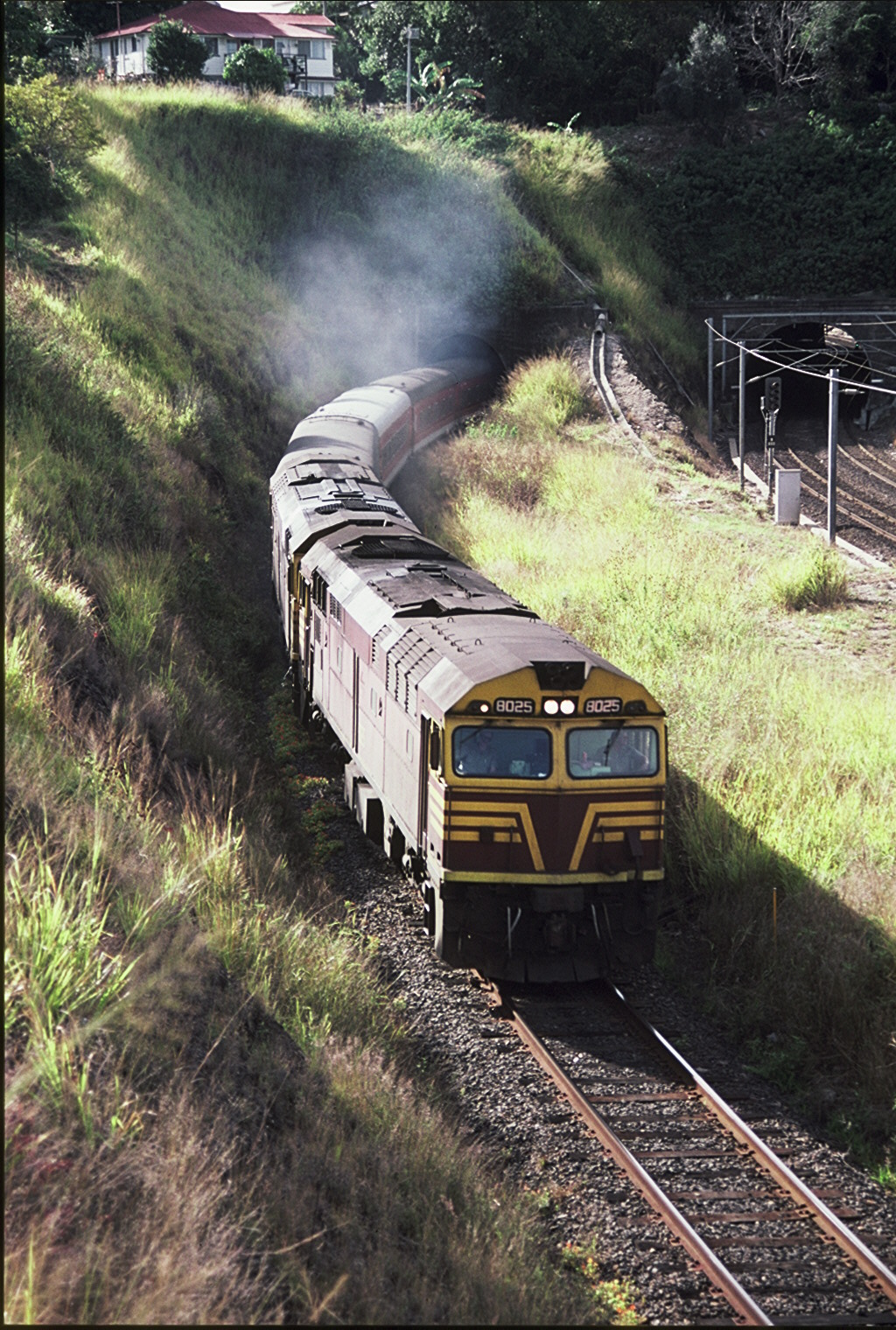
Before the introduction of XPT railcars, the Brisbane Limited train between Sydney and Brisbane (here in 1987) was hauled by locomotives

== Description ==
The main line consists of:

- the 195-kilometre (121 mi) Main North line from Sydney Central station to Telarah station, in Maitland, and
- the 792-kilometre (492 mi) North Coast line from Telarah to Roma Street station, Brisbane.

Freight trains operate along the entire corridor, as does a daily (each way) XPT passenger service, in addition to a service to Casino.

== History ==
Originally the corridor consisted of 1435 mm (4 ft 8 1/2 in) standard gauge track in New South Wales and 1067 mm (3 ft 6 in) narrow gauge track in Queensland, which met at a break-of-gauge station at Wallangarra. In 1930 the NSW North Coast line was extended from Casino to Brisbane making through services possible, using a rail ferry for the river crossing in Grafton until the Grafton Bridge opened in 1932. The superseded Main Northern railway line, which went to Wallangarra, now terminates near Armidale.

== Gallery ==
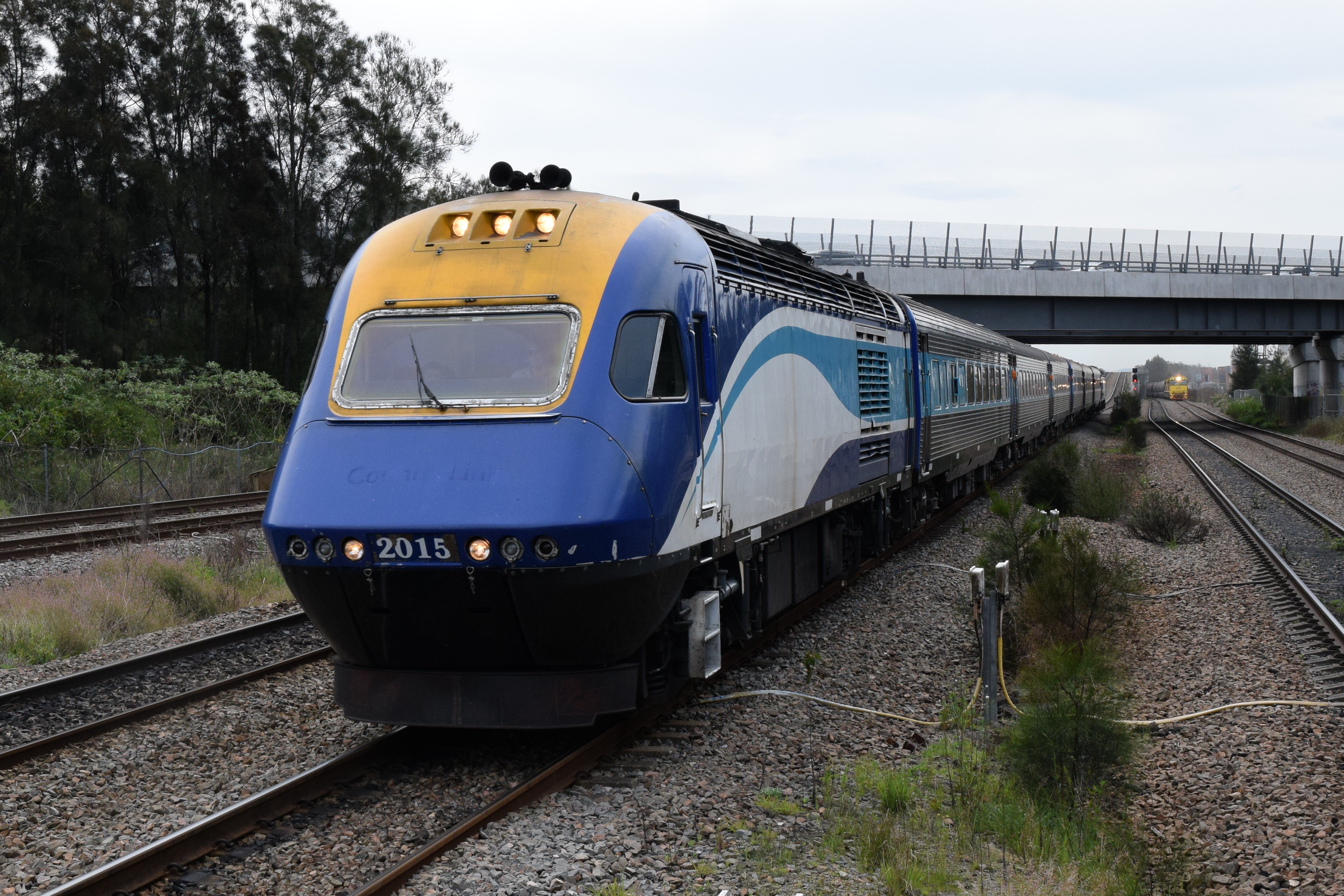

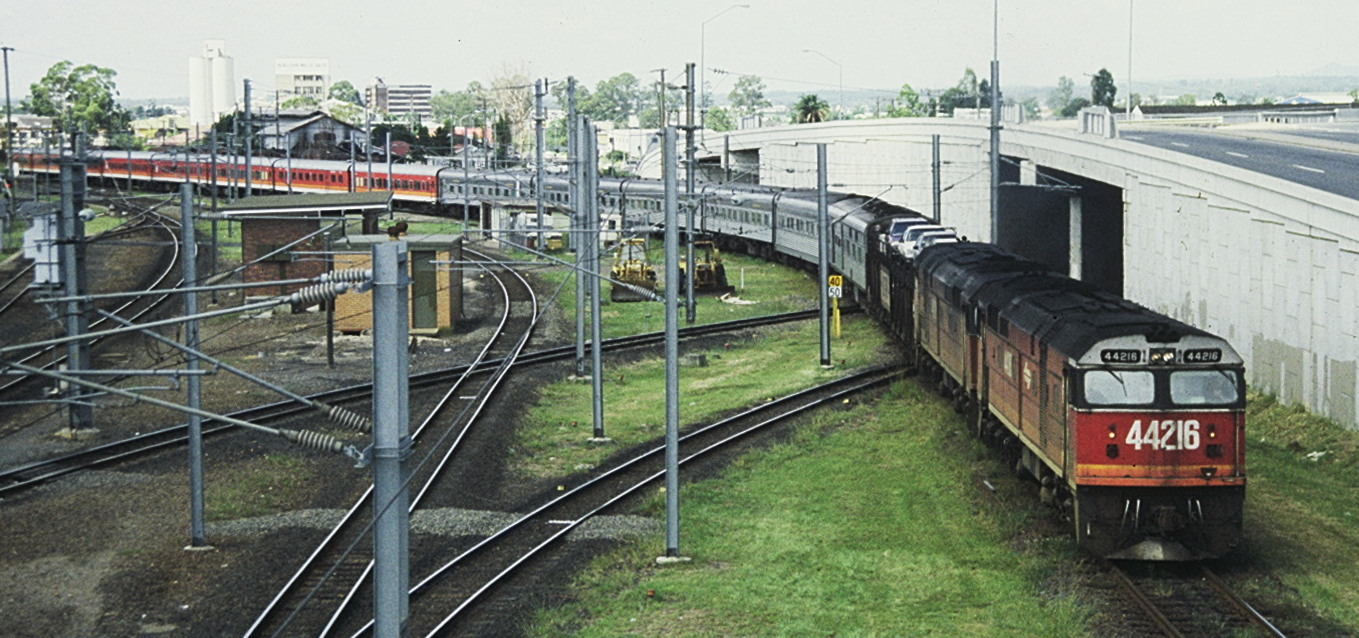

A daily XPT service between Sydney and Brisbane travels the full 987 kilometres (613 miles) length of the corridor

The northbound Brisbane Limited at Yeerongpilly in 1987 was locomotive-hauled

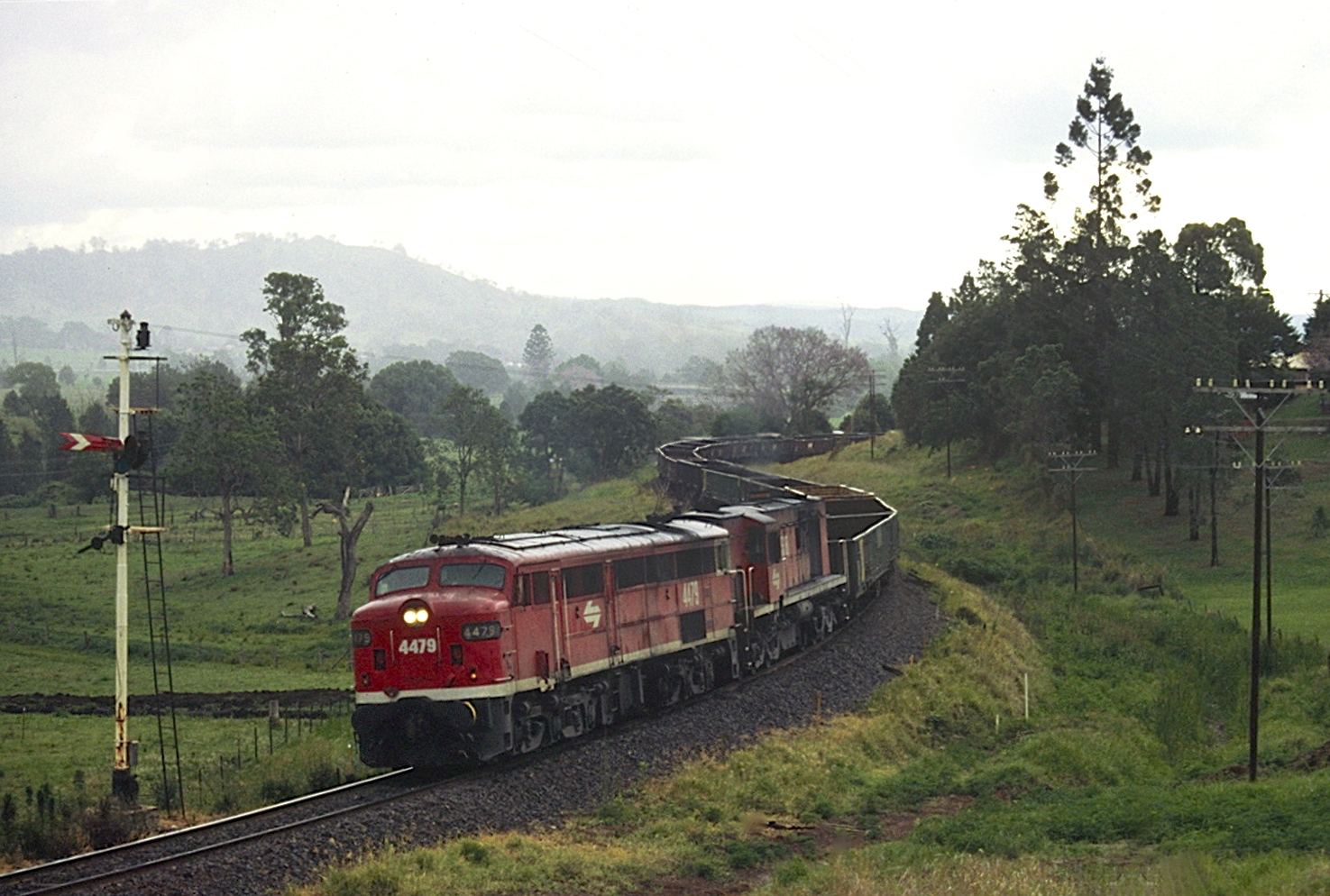

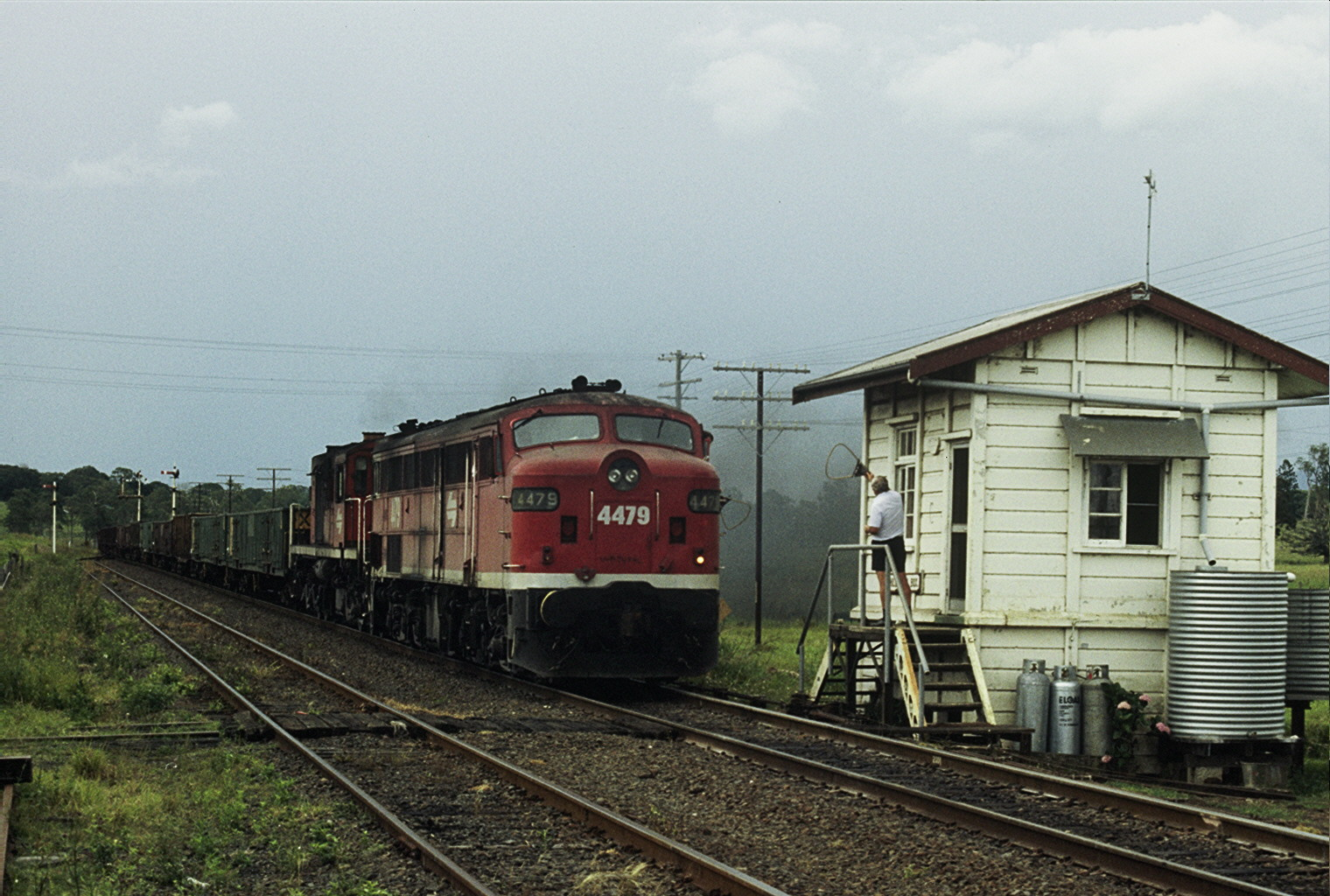

A southbound goods train in 1987 near Kyogle, where until 1930 the track terminated. Previously, both passengers and freight on the (further inland) Main North line had to change between standard gauge (NSW) and narrow gauge (QLD)

Staff operation, in which tokens authorizing access to track sections are physically exchanged, has now been superseded by Centralised traffic control in the corridor

== See also ==
- Northern Sydney Freight Corridor – a package of capacity improvements between Sydney and Newcastle
