= Division of Wright =

Australian federal electoral division

Coordinates: 27.917°S 152.674°E

Wright Australian House of Representatives Division
- Interactive map of boundaries since the 2019 federal election
- Created: 2009
- MP: Scott Buchholz
- Party: Liberal Party (Note: Member of the Liberal National Party of Queensland sitting with the federal parliamentary Liberal Party.)
- Namesake: Judith Wright
- Electors: 140,302 (2025)
- Area: 7,577 km^{2} (2,925.5 sq mi)
- Demographic: Rural and provincial
Electorates around Wright:
Groom	Maranoa; Blair; Oxley	Rankin; Forde
Maranoa	Wright	Fadden; Moncrieff
New England (NSW)	Page (NSW)	McPherson; Richmond (NSW)

The Division of Wright is an Australian electoral division in the state of Queensland. It is southwest of Brisbane on the border with New South Wales, stretching from outside of the Gold Coast in the east to outside of Toowoomba in the west. Its first and current MP has been Scott Buchholz of the Liberal Party since 2010.

== Geography ==
Federal electoral division boundaries in Australia are determined at redistributions by a redistribution committee appointed by the Australian Electoral Commission. Redistributions occur for the boundaries of divisions in a particular state, and they occur every seven years, or sooner if a state's representation entitlement changes or when divisions of a state are malapportioned.

The Division of Wright covers 7,577 square kilometres, stretching from the western Gold Coast, through the remnant rural areas between Logan City and the NSW border, and around to include the Lockyer Valley Council area west of Ipswich. As well as covering most of the Gold Coast hinterland, Wright includes Beaudesert, Jimboomba, Boonah, Laidley, Gatton, Hatton Vale and Helidon.

== History ==
The seat was first contested at the 2010 election. The division was created under the Australian Electoral Commission's 2009 Redistribution of Queensland.

The name of the electorate was chosen to honour the poet Judith Wright. The division has been represented since the 2010 election by Scott Buchholz, a member of the Liberal Party.

== Members ==
Image	Member	Party	Term	Notes
	Scott Buchholz (1968–)	Liberal	21 August 2010 – present	Served as Chief Government Whip in the House under Abbott and Turnbull. Incumbent

== Election results ==
2025 Australian federal election: Wright
Party	Candidate	Votes	%	±%
Liberal National	Scott Buchholz	39,809	34.06	−9.13
Labor	Pam McCreadie	29,708	25.42	+4.05
One Nation	Natalie Davis	18,998	16.25	+2.00
Greens	Nicole Thompson	11,128	9.52	−1.91
People First	Justin McGuiness	5,928	5.07	+5.07
Trumpet of Patriots	Scott Thompson	5,864	5.02	+3.48
Family First	Julie Rose	3,179	2.72	+2.72
Animal Justice	Chloe Snyman	2,266	1.94	+1.94
Total formal votes		116,880	93.85	−2.75
Informal votes		7,655	6.15	+2.75
Turnout		124,535	88.77	+0.18
Two-party-preferred result
Liberal National	Scott Buchholz	67,764	57.98	−2.91
Labor	Pam McCreadie	49,116	42.02	+2.91
Liberal National hold		Swing	−2.91	
