= Blair (disambiguation) =

Blair is both a surname and given name.

Blair may also refer to:

== Places ==
In the Andaman and Nicobar Islands

- Port Blair, the capital of the Andaman and Nicobar Islands

In Australia:

- Division of Blair, an electoral district in the Australian House of Representatives, in Queensland

In Canada:

- Blair Road, a major road in Ottawa
- Blair, Ontario, a village in Cambridge, Regional Municipality of Waterloo, Ontario

In Malaysia

- Blair's Harbour, or Blair Harbour

In New Zealand

- Blair Peak (New Zealand), a mountain in the Southern Alps

In the United States:

- Blair, Kansas
- Blair, Maryland, fictional locale in the 1999 film Blair Witch Project
- Blair, Nebraska
- Blair, Nevada
- Blair, Oklahoma
- Blair, Tennessee
- Blair, Wisconsin
- Blair, Jefferson County, West Virginia
- Blair, Logan County, West Virginia
- Blair County, Pennsylvania
- Blair Township, Clay County, Illinois
- Blair Township, Michigan
- Blair Township, Pennsylvania

== Other ==
- Blair Academy, a private high school in Blairstown, New Jersey, United States
- Blair Corporation, American mail-order retailer of clothing and home products
- Blair (publisher), an American nonprofit publisher
- Blair Road, a major north–south artery in Ottawa, Canada
- Blair Station (OC Transpo), a transit station of Ottawa's OC Transpo public transit network

== See also ==
- Blair's Sauces and Snacks, a United States snack company founded in 1989
- Blair Athol (disambiguation)
- Blair Atholl, a town in Perth and Kinross, Scotland
  - Blair Castle, a castle in that town
- Blair's Cove, in Durrus, County Cork, Ireland
- Blair House, the residence of Harry Truman during his term of presidency in the United States
- Blair toilet, a form of long-drop developed in Zimbabwe for use in rural communities
- The Blair Witch Project, a horror film
- Montgomery Blair High School, Silver Spring, Maryland, United States
- Justice Blair (disambiguation)
