= Blair Athol =

Blair Athol or variation, may refer:

== Places ==
Australia

- Blair Athol, New South Wales, Australia
- Blair Athol, Queensland, Australia
- Blair Athol, South Australia, Australia

Scotland

- Blair Atholl, Perth and Kinross, Scotland, UK
  - Blair Atholl railway station
- Blair Athol distillery in Pitlochry, Scotland, UK

== Other uses ==
- Blair Athol (horse) was a British racehorse that won the 1864 Epsom Derby
- Blair of Athol (ship), a Canadian ship operating in Yukon and British Columbia; see List of historical ships in British Columbia and List of steamboats on the Yukon River

== See also ==
- Blair (disambiguation)
- Athol (disambiguation)
- Atholl (disambiguation)
