= Locations in South Africa with a Scottish name =

This is a list of placenames in Scotland which have subsequently been applied to parts of South Africa by Scottish emigrants or explorers.

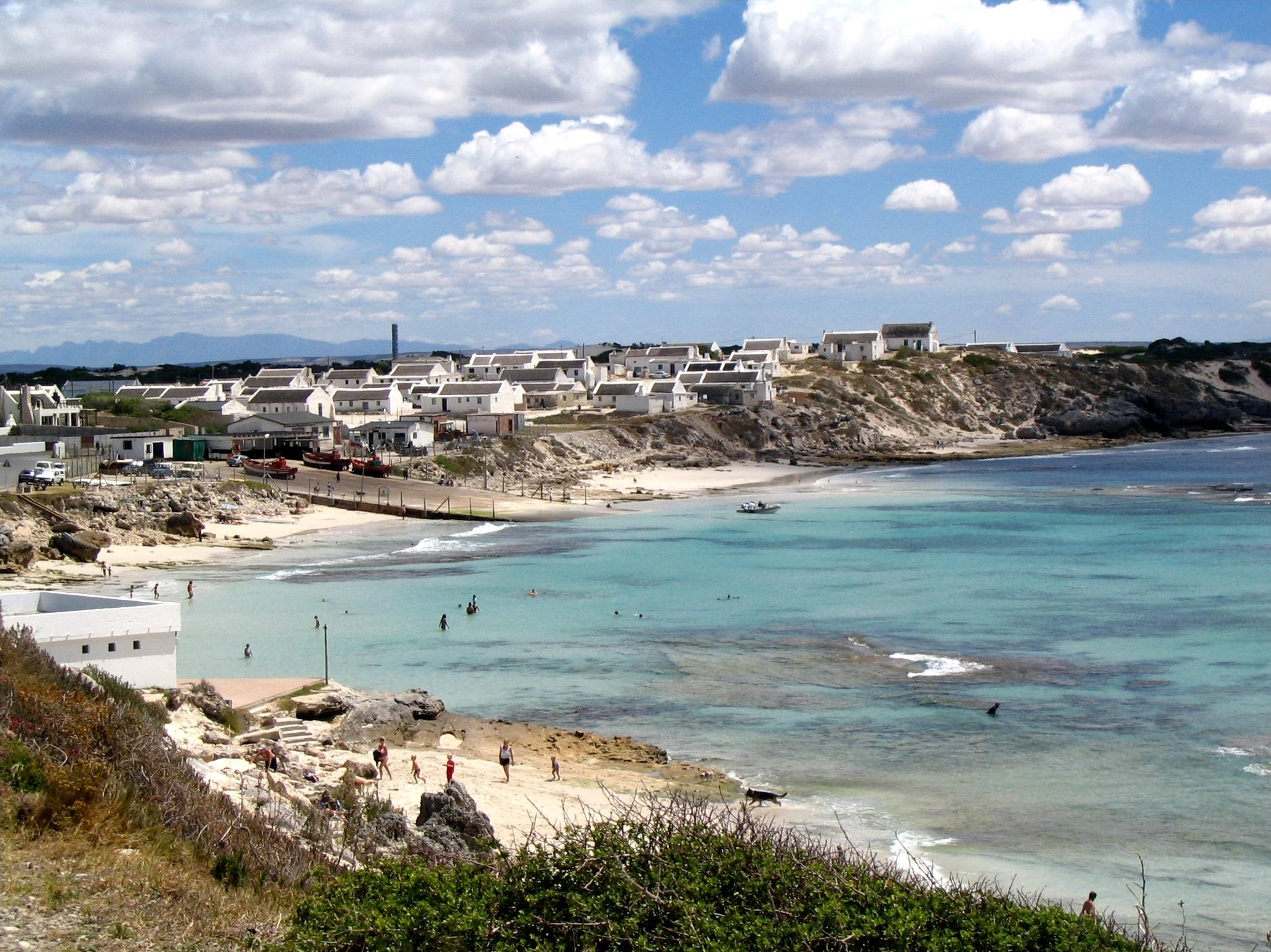
Arniston, South Africa's typical fisherman houses

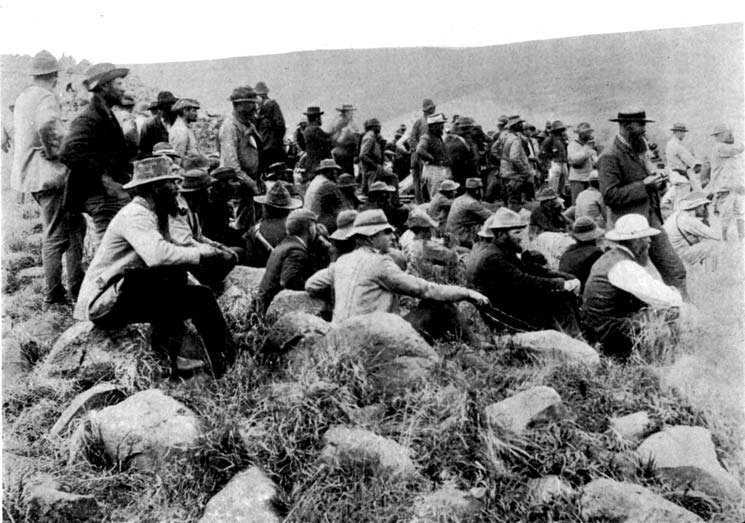
Boers watch the fighting at Dundee in 1899

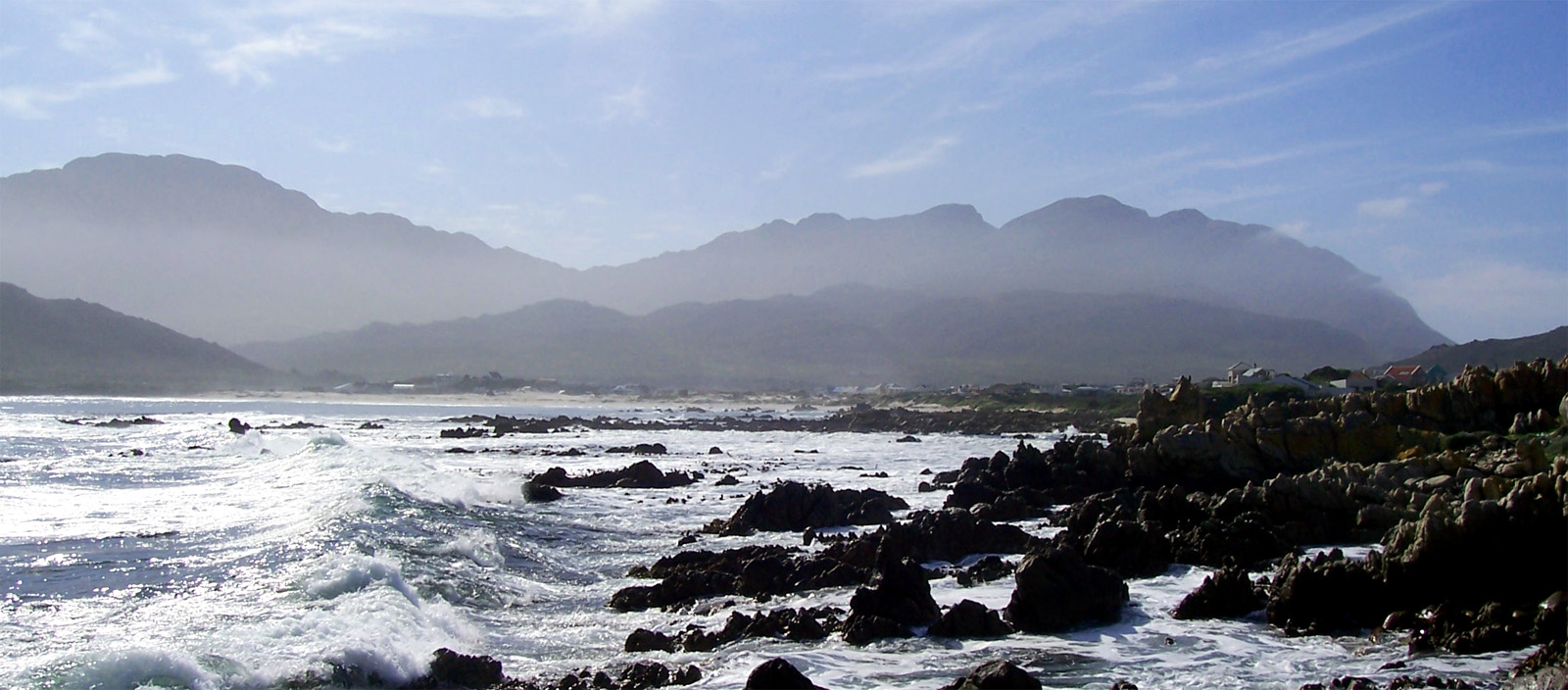
Pringle Bay at the foot of Hangklip

== Eastern Cape ==
  - Aberdeen
  - Albany, South Africa (named after Albany, New York, in turn from the Gaelic name for Scotland, Alba)
  - Cathcart (George Cathcart)
  - Grahamstown (John Graham (British Army officer))

== KwaZulu-Natal (native) ==
  - Balgowan
  - Dundee
  - Glencoe
  - Scottburgh

Kelso, Kwazulu, South Africa

== Gauteng ==
  - Suburbs of Johannesburg
    - Abbotsford
    - Argyll
    - Atholl
    - Balmoral
    - Birnam
    - Blairgowrie
    - Brushwood Haugh (Haugh being a Lowland Scots word for meadow)
    - Buccleuch
    - Craighall
    - Douglasdale
    - Dunkeld
    - Dunnotar
    - Dunvegan
    - Glen Atholl
    - Glen Esk
    - Heriotdale
    - Kelvin
    - Melrose
    - Melville
    - Moffat View
    - Morningside
    - Morningside Manor
    - Strathavon
  - Towns on the East Rand
    - Germiston
    - Wattville

== Mpumalanga ==
  - Balfour (formerly "McHattiesburg")

== North West Province ==
  - Orkney

== Northern Cape ==
  - Alexander Bay (James Edward Alexander)
  - Campbell
  - Sutherland

== Western Cape ==
  - Arniston (Arniston, Midlothian)
  - Clanwilliam
  - Elgin
  - Gordon's Bay
  - McGregor
  - Napier
  - Pringle Bay
  - Robertson (Rev William Robertson)
  - Suburbs of Cape Town
    - Airlie
    - Balvenie
    - Bellville (after Charles Davidson Bell, Surveyor-General of the Cape from 1848 to 1872)
    - Bonnie Brook (Burn is the normal form in Scotland)
    - Brackenfell
    - Clunie
    - Crawford
    - Crofters' Valley
    - Dunoon
    - Dunrobin
    - Glencairn
    - Lochiel
    - Schotsche Kloof - Afrikaans for "Scottish Ravine".
    - St Kilda
    - The Glen
  - Finlay's Point
  - Murray's Bay, on Robben Island, named after John Murray, a Scottish whaler
