= Birnam =

Birnam may refer to:

== Australia ==
- Birnam, Queensland (North Burnett Region), a neighbourhood within the locality Bancroft
- Birnam, Queensland (Scenic Rim Region), a locality
- Birnam, Queensland (Toowoomba Region), a locality

== United Kingdom ==
- Birnam, Perth and Kinross, a village near Dunkeld, Scotland, the location of Great Birnam Wood in Shakespeare's Macbeth

== South Africa ==
- Birnam, Gauteng, a suburb of Johannesburg
