= Athol (given name) =

Athol is a masculine given name. People with the name include:

- Athol Cooper (1892–1970), English-born Australian politician
- Joe Earl (born 1952 as Athol Earl), New Zealand former rower
- Athol Fugard (1932–2025), South African playwright, novelist, actor and director
- Athol Gill (1937–1992), Australian theologian
- Athol Guy (born 1940), member of Australian pop group The Seekers
- Athol Hodgetts (born 1951), former Australian rules football player and administrator
- Athol Johnson (born 1915), Australian lawn bowler
- Athol Layton (1921–1984), ring name Lord Athol Layton, English-Australian professional wrestler, amateur boxer and professional wrestling commentator
- Athol Meech (1907–1981), Canadian rower
- Athol Meyer (1940–1998), Australian journalist and politician
- Athelstane Athol Milne (1889–1946), Australian rules footballer
- Athol Murray (1892–1975), Canadian priest and educator, member of the Hockey Hall of Fame and Canada's Sports Hall of Fame as a builder
- Athol Rowan (1921–1998), South African cricketer
- Athol Shephard (1920–2006), Australian cricketer
- Athol Shmith (1914–1990), Australian photographer and photography educator
- Athol Smith (1915–1980), Australian rugby league footballer
- Athol Sharp (1894–1969), Australian rules footballer
- Athol Trollip (born 1964), South African politician
- Athol Tymms (1886–1949), Australian rules footballer
- Athol Webb (1935–2026), Australian rules footballer
- Athol Whimp (1961–2012) was a New Zealand mountaineer and rock climber
- Athol Williams (born 1970), South African poet and social philosopher
