= Atholl (disambiguation) =

Atholl is a region of Scotland.

Atholl may also refer to:

== Titles ==
- Duke of Atholl, in the Peerage of Scotland from 1703
- Earl of Atholl, a Scottish title between 10th–17th century

== People ==
- Atholl MacGregor (1883–1945), Scottish lawyer and judge
- Atholl McKinnon (1932–1983), South African cricketer
- Atholl Oakeley (1900–1987), Welsh wrestler and wrestling promoter

== Places ==
- Atholl, South Africa, a suburb of Johannesburg
- Cape Atholl, Greenland
- Mount Atholl, Antarctica

== Ships ==
- HMCS Atholl, a modified Flower-class corvette that served with the Royal Canadian Navy during World War II
- Atholl (ship), a brig wrecked off Port Elliot, South Australia, in 1864

== Other uses ==
- Atholl Highlanders, a private infantry regiment

== See also ==
- Atoll (disambiguation)
- Athol (disambiguation)
