= Atoll (disambiguation) =

An atoll is a type of island.

Atoll or ATOLL may also refer to:

- Atolls Rural LLG in off the coast of Bougainville, Papua New Guinea
- Atoll (band), a French progressive rock band
- atoll (programming), a function in C programming language
- ATOLL programming language, used for automating the checking and launch of Saturn rockets
- Antarctic Technology Offshore Lagoon Laboratory, a floating oceanographic laboratory
- Vympel K-13 (NATO reporting name), a Soviet and Russian air-to-air missile

== See also ==
- Atholl (disambiguation)
- Athol (disambiguation)
- Atol (disambiguation)
- Atole, a Mexican hot beverage
