= Athol =

Athol may refer to:

== Places ==
=== Scotland ===
- Atholl, Scotland, a district in central Scotland

=== Canada ===
- Athol, Nova Scotia, a small community
- Athol, Prince Edward County, Ontario, a municipality and census division
- Athol, a rural community in North Glengarry, Ontario

=== United States ===
- Athol, Idaho, a city
- Athol, Kansas, a city
- Athol, Kentucky, an unincorporated community
- Athol, Massachusetts, a town
  - Athol (CDP), Massachusetts, a census-designated place within the town
- Athol, original name of Thurman, New York, a town
- Athol, South Dakota, an unincorporated community

=== Elsewhere ===
- Athol, Queensland, Australia, a rural locality
- Athol, New Zealand, a town
- Athol Island, Bahamas

== Buildings ==
- Athol (Henderson, Maryland), a home on the National Register of Historic Places (NRHP)
- Athol (Simpsonville, Maryland), a historic plantation house
- Athol (Edenton, North Carolina), a plantation house on the NRHP
- Athol Manor, Columbia, Maryland

== People ==
- Athol (given name)

== See also ==
- Atholl (disambiguation)
- Atoll (disambiguation)
