= Blair, West Virginia =

Blair is the name of several communities in the U.S. state of West Virginia.

- Blair, Jefferson County, West Virginia
- Blair, Logan County, West Virginia
