= Mundoolun =

- Suburb
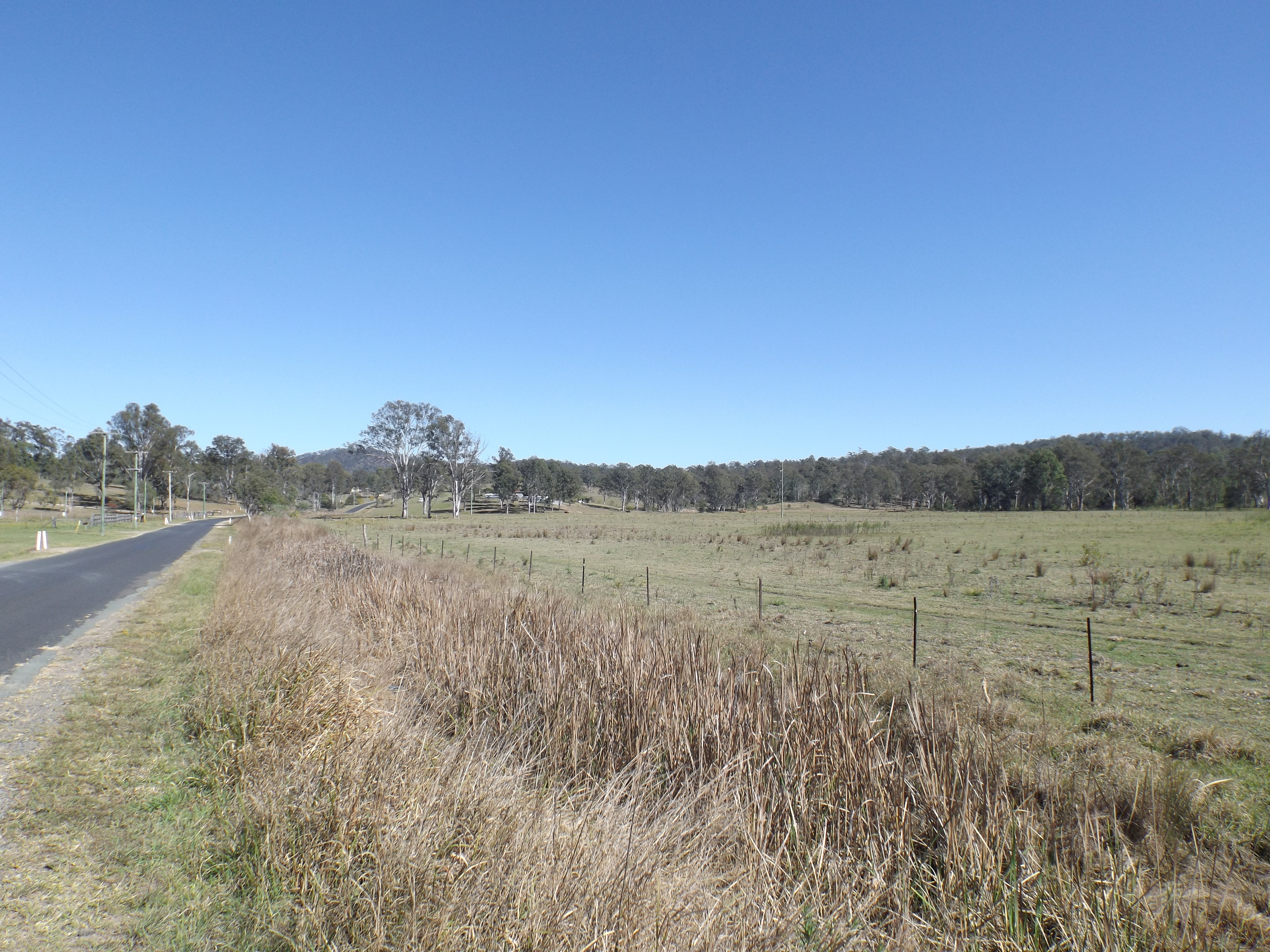
- Paddocks along Tremayne Road, 2014

- Interactive map of Mundoolun
- Coordinates: 27.8941°S 153.0711°E
- Country: Australia
- State: Queensland
- City: Logan City
- LGA: Logan City
- Location: 18.4 km (11.4 mi) SW of Yarrabilba; 21.7 km (13.5 mi) NE of Beaudesert; 38.9 km (24.2 mi) S of Logan Central; 55.1 km (34.2 mi) S of Brisbane CBD
- Established: 1842

Government
  - State electorate: Scenic Rim
  - Federal division: Wright

Area
  - Total: 43.6 km^{2} (16.8 sq mi)

Population
  - Total: 1,836 (2021 census)
  - Density: 42.11/km^{2} (109.06/sq mi)
- Time zone: UTC+10:00 (AEST)
- Postcode: 4285
- Annual rainfall: 988 mm (38.9 in)
Suburbs around Mundoolun
Jimboomba	Tamborine	Tamborine
Cedar Vale	Mundoolun	Tamborine
Veresdale Scrub	Birnan	Boyland

Mundoolun is a rural locality in the City of Logan, Queensland, Australia. The locality was among the first pastoral runs in the Logan/Albert river catchment. In the 2021 census, Mundoolun had a population of 1,836 people.

== Geography ==
The locality is located in the Albert River valley, bounded by the Albert River to the east and the Birnam Range to the west. Mundoolun Bridge marks the boundary between the Upper and Lower Albert River reaches.

In recent years, housing lots have been developed as part of the 'Mundoolun Estate' situated east of Mundoolun Road.

Beaudesert–Beenleigh Road runs through the locality’s south-east corner.

== History ==
The name Mundoolun is generally attributed to mundoolgunn (various spellings, including mundulgunn), a place name for death adder in the Bundjalung language (Yugambeh dialect). In 1936 a toponymic list appeared in The Courier-Mail newspaper referring to an indigenous word Mundoolunookum of the same meaning.

Mundoolun is part of the region occupied by the Wangerriburra people prior to European settlement. The Wangerriburra were commonly known as the Albert tribe and their territory consisted of the middle Albert River basin and upper Coomera River.

In 1827 Captain Patrick Logan, commandant of the Moreton Bay penal colony, made an expedition to Mount Barney. The expedition is believed to have passed through the Mundoolun area; Logan notes in his journal, "June 18th.—Continued my route; passed through a rich valley;".

=== Mundoolun station ===
Closure of the penal settlement in 1842 and its 50-mile (80 km) exclusion radius opened the area to pastoralists. In 1842 William Humphreys, a sheep grazier on the Liverpool Plains, took up several thousand acres on the Albert River and established a pastoral property, or station (Depasturing License number 661). Although Humphreys initially used the name 'Mount Martin Station', the property soon became known as 'Moondoolun' (or 'Moondoolan') which was later changed to 'Mundoolun' (closer to the generally accepted pronunciation). Humphreys encouraged his cousin Anne Collins and her husband John to join him there in 1844. By 1847 the Collins family were sole owners of the Mundoolun property.

Humphreys farmed sheep and built a three room cottage, with ironbark slabs and a thatched roof. The cottage was sited near the Albert River which provided a water supply. A similar cottage was built by the Collins family nearby.

After a decade of extension (ca. 1854) the Collins's slab hut became essentially the homestead that stands today (the Old Homestead). The outer walls consist of pit-sawn local cedar. Wide verandas exemplify the residences of the period. An outside cooking shed was erected to reduce the risk of fire. The eldest sons, Robert and William, helped introduce cattle (sheep were moved to properties further west when they proved unsuitable for coastal country). Another homestead, built on the property in 1915 by the Fraser family—descendants of the Collins, burnt down in 1939. The Old Homestead is still inhabited by the Fraser family, who continue to run the property which occupied just over 3,000 hectares (7,400 acres) in 2011.

From 1863 to 1872 a government financed mail coach operated between Casino and Brisbane, stopping at Mundoolun.

=== Tick fever experiments ===
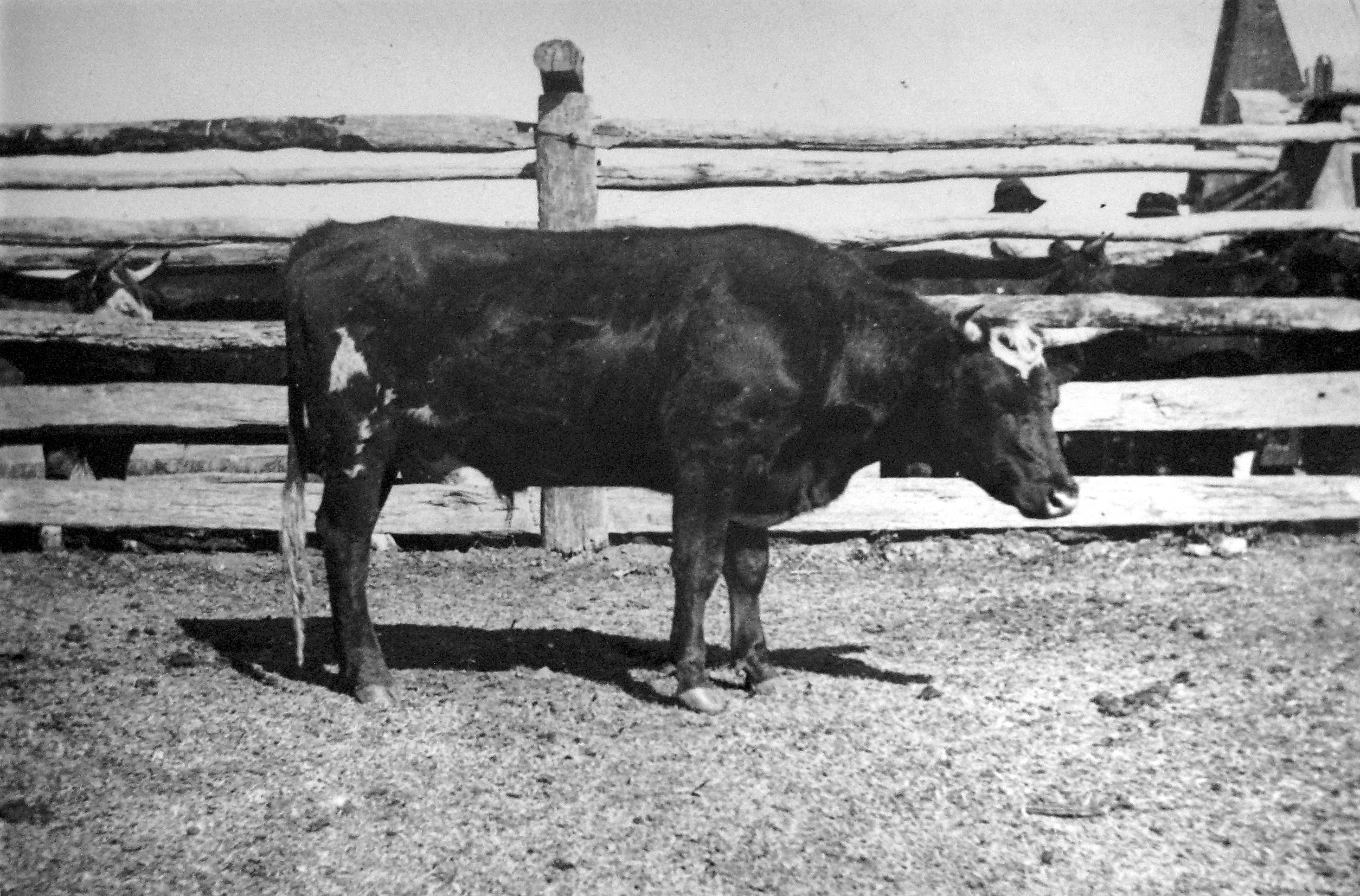
Tick Fever No. 2 Steer Mundoolun Experiments, 1897

Mundoolun's association with investigating the tick-borne disease of cattle caused by blood parasites, known as tick fever or red water (babesiosis, anaplasmosis), began with William Collins, the second son of John and Anne. William and his older brother Robert had travelled through cattle districts in North America during the 1870s, and on returning to Australia the brothers contributed to the improvement of the Queensland pastoral industry. Tick fever was recognised as a serious threat to Queensland cattle during the 1890s, and in 1896 William and Dr J. Sidney Hunt were sent by the government to the United States to inquire into the American cattle tick problem (known there as Texas fever or Southern cattle fever).

The following year in 1897, cattle on the Collins's Mundoolun station were inoculated in pioneering experiments for tick fever conducted by Charles Joseph Pound of the Queensland Stock Institute. Inoculum was sourced, directly and by passage through calves, from steers of Inkerman Station in northern Queensland which had recovered from tick fever. Pound's observations were reported to include: cattle were a host for the disease "germ", and indications that immunity may be acquired in utero or induced by inoculation.

The work following these experiments resulted in Pound producing a pamphlet in 1898 for the inoculation of cattle. Pound referred to experiments and experience as supporting "the efficacy of the method of preventive inoculation for tick fever as first initiated in the Mundoolun and Inkerman experiments of April, 1897".

=== Moondoolan School ===
Moondoolan Provisional School opened circa 1880 and closed circa 1898. In 1892 it was described as one of the best taught and organised provisional schools in the state.

=== St John's church ===
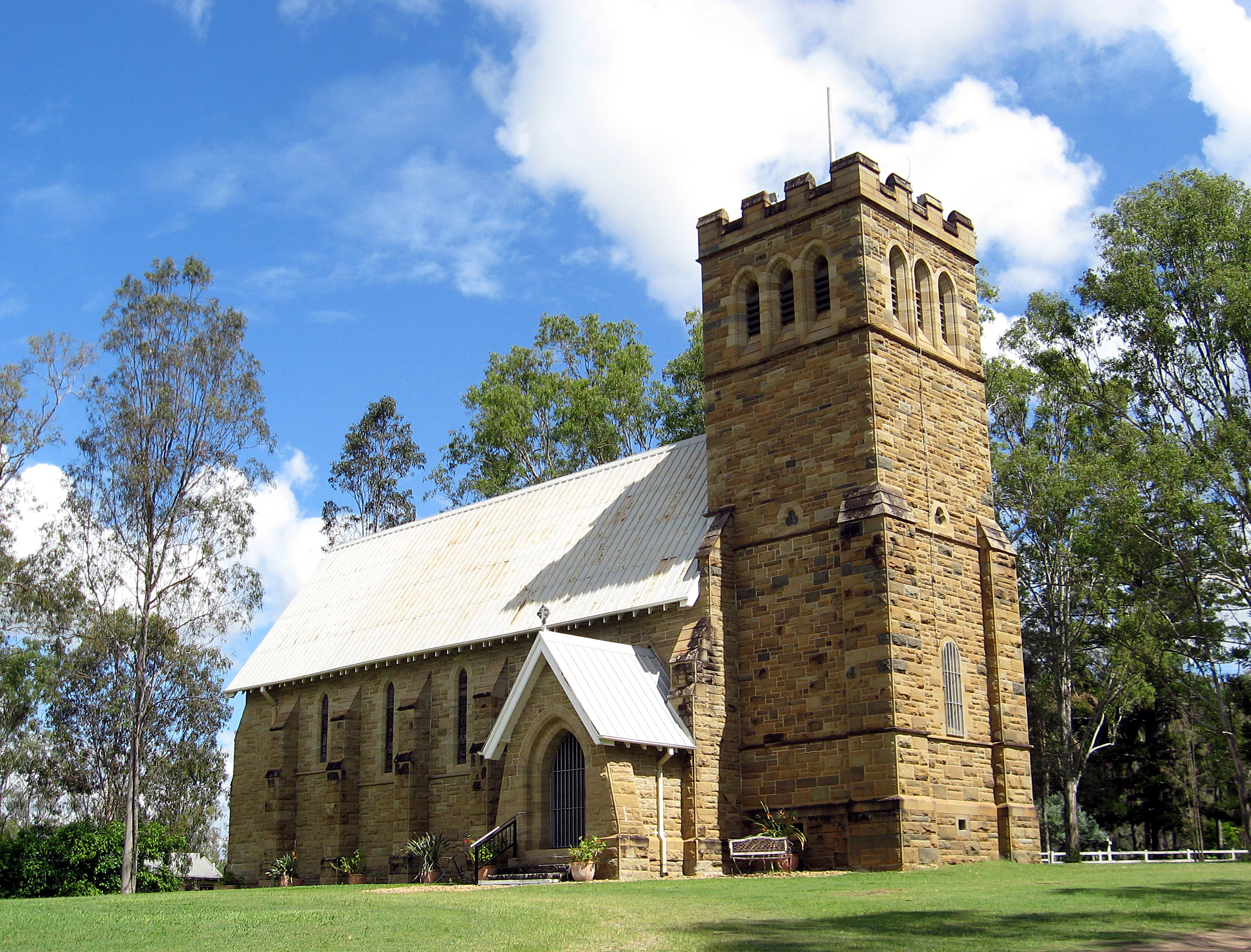
St John's Mundoolun Church, 2013

A private family chapel, also known as the Memorial Church of St John the Evangelist, was built in 1901 by the Collins family in memory of John and Anne Collins. Situated west of Mundoolun Road, the church was built from local sandstone to a design by John H. Buckeridge, Diocesan Architect of Brisbane at the time. The style is described as Early English Gothic with a square, castellated bell tower. The site was selected next to the family cemetery, on a ridge of the Birnam Range behind the Mundoolun homestead. The church was added to the Queensland Heritage Register in 1999.

In the cemetery is the grave of Bullumm (1850–1931), also known as John Allen, the last survivor of the Wangerriburra people and a lifelong associate of the Collins family. In 1913 Bullumm helped John Lane, headmaster of the Jimboomba State School, to compile the Wangerriburra language, and their work was included as an appendix in the 1913 annual report of The Chief Protector of Aboriginals.

=== Artillery and light horse ===
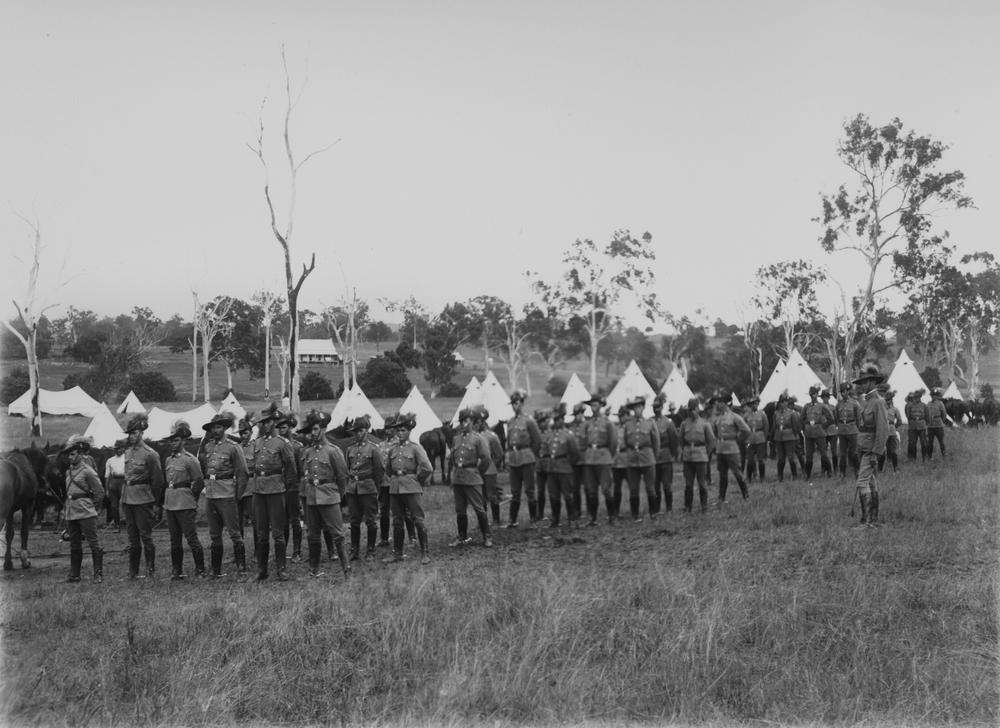
Light-horsemen on parade in an army camp near Mundoolun, 1909

As early as 1901, the year Australia became federated, the Mundoolun area was used for military exercises. In March that year the Brisbane Courier newspaper contained the notice, "the Field Artillery Section, Q.R.R.A.A. (Queensland Regiment Royal Australian Artillery), will proceed to camp at Mundoolun, by road, on the 25th instant, for the purpose of carrying out artillery practice". The notice mentions Major Chauvel in command of the Headquarters Band.

These military exercises were regularly conducted in the area prior to the First World War. In 1913 a Brisbane Courier report gave details of the camp, then named Tambourine [sic] Camp, describing its location, "The site of the camp is practically the same as in former years, namely, on a slope overlooking the Albert River and Mundoolun Homestead,". The report notes the suitability of the site due to the quality of water from the Albert River at Mundoolun for drinking, washing, and swimming.

One member of the Collins family, Douglas Martin Fraser (1888–1968), served with the 5th Light Horse Regiment in Palestine during 1918. Fraser had married Marion Dorothea Jane, daughter of Robert Collins, in 1915 and it was on the Collins's property at Mundoolun where their first home was built.

=== World War 2 ===
Military training is still conducted in the region at the Canungra Military Area which was established during the Second World War.

=== 21st century ===
Formerly in the Shire of Beaudesert, Mundoolun became part of Logan City following the local government amalgamations in March 2008.

== Demographics ==
In the 2011 census, Mundoolun recorded a population of 1,327 people, 50.6% female and 49.4% male. The median age of the Mundoolun population was 34 years, 3 years below the national median of 37. 76.6% of people living in Mundoolun were born in Australia. The other top responses for country of birth were England 7.4%, New Zealand 4%, Netherlands 1.1%, Germany 0.7%, United States of America 0.6%. 93.4% of people spoke only English at home; the next most common languages were 1.1% Dutch, 0.9% German, 0.5% Finnish, 0.3% French, 0.3% Spanish.

In the 2016 census, Mundoolun had a population of 1,551 people.

In the 2021 census, Mundoolun had a population of 1,836 people.

== Heritage listings ==
Mundoolun has a number of heritage-listed sites, including:

- St John's Church, Mundoolun Road

== Education ==
There are no schools in Mundoolun. The nearest government primary schools are Jimboomba State School in neighbouring Jimboomba to the north-west, Beaudesert State School in Beaudesert to the south, and Veresdale Scrub State School in neighbouring Veresdale Scrub to the south-west. The nearest government secondary schools are Yarrabilba State Secondary College in Yarrabilba to the north and Beaudesert State High School in Beaudesert to the south.

== See also ==
- Logan City
- Albert River (Queensland)
