= Atol =

Atol may refer to:

- Atol (drink), a traditional cornstarch-based Central American hot drink
- atol (programming), a function in C programming language
- ATOL 495, a Finnish amphibious ultralight aircraft

ATOL may refer to:

- Air Travel Organisers' Licensing, a UK Civil Aviation Authority scheme to protect air travellers

== See also ==
- Atoll (disambiguation)
