= Cedar Vale, Queensland =

Cedar Vale
- Suburb
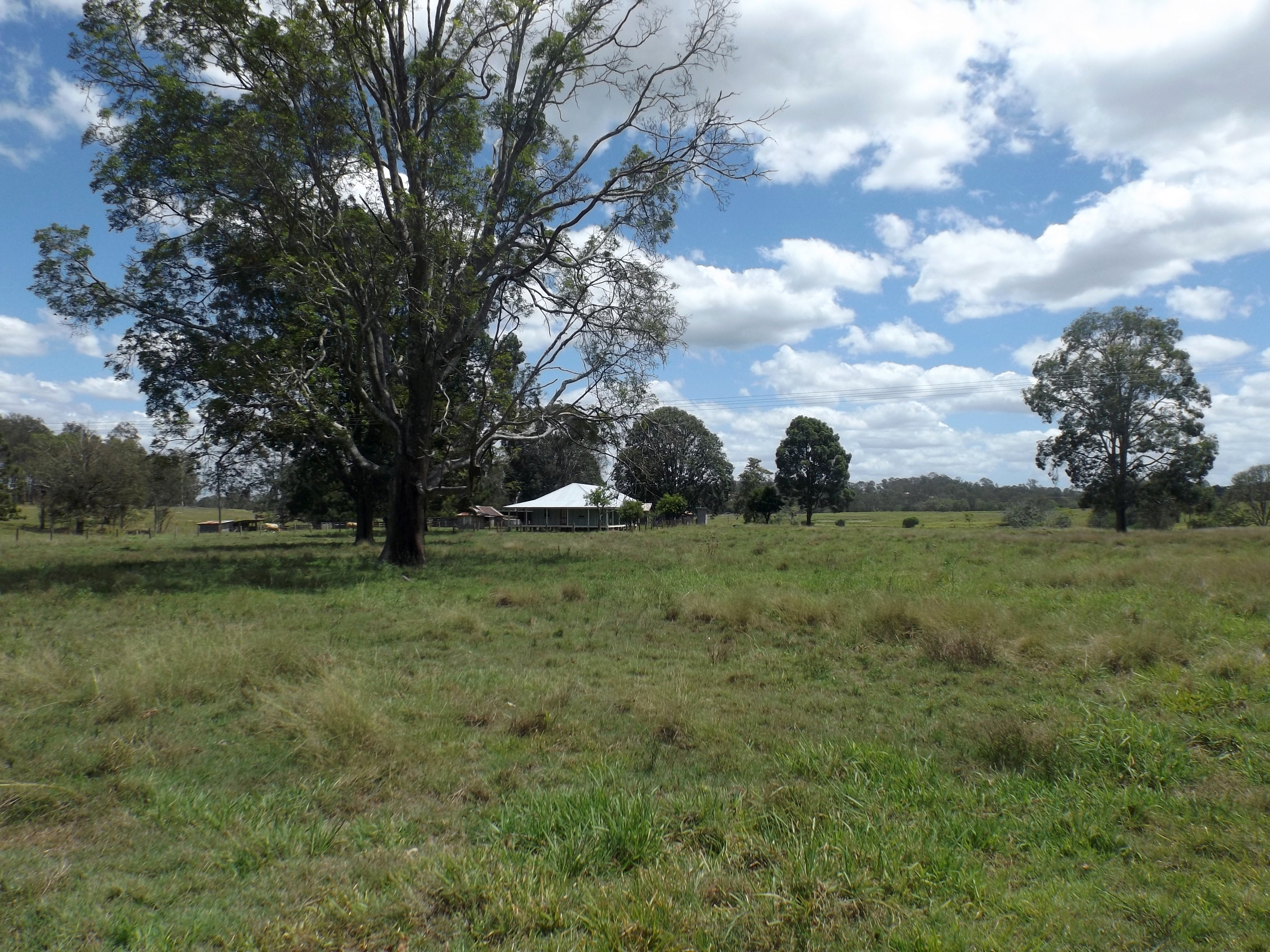
- Fields along Cedar Vale Road, 2016

- Interactive map of Cedar Vale
- Coordinates: 27.8797°S 153.015°E
- Country: Australia
- State: Queensland
- City: Logan City
- LGA: Logan City
- Location: 36.6 km (22.7 mi) SSW of Logan Central; 51.4 km (31.9 mi) S of Brisbane CBD

Government
  - State electorate: Scenic Rim
  - Federal division: Wright

Area
  - Total: 15.7 km^{2} (6.1 sq mi)

Population
  - Total: 2,856 (2021 census)
  - Density: 181.9/km^{2} (471.1/sq mi)
- Time zone: UTC+10:00 (AEST)
- Postcode: 4285
Suburbs around Cedar Vale
Cedar Grove	Jimboomba	Jimboomba
Woodhill	Cedar Vale	Mundoolun
Veresdale Scrub	Veresdale Scrub	Mundoolun

Cedar Vale is a rural locality in the City of Logan, Queensland, Australia. In the 2021 census, Cedar Vale had a population of 2,856 people.

== Geography ==
The Mount Lindesay Highway runs along the north-western boundary. Scrubby Creek forms the northern and eastern boundary of the locality.

== History ==
Formerly in the Shire of Beaudesert, Cedar Vale became part of Logan City following the local government amalgamations in March 2008.

== Demographics ==
In the 2011 census, Cedar Vale had a population of 2,971.

In the 2016 census, Cedar Vale had a population of 2,792 people.

In the 2021 census, Cedar Vale had a population of 2,856 people.

== Education ==
There are no schools in Cedar Vale. The nearest government primary schools are Jimboomba State School in neighbouring Jimboomba to the north, Veresdale Scrub State School in neighbouring Veresdale Scrub to the south, and Woodhill State School in neighbouring Woodhill to the south-west. The nearest government secondary schools are Flagstone State Community College in Flagstone to the north-west and Beaudesert State High School in Beaudesert to the south.

== Amenities ==
There are a number of parks in the area:

- Birchwood Street Park (27.8831°S 153.0117°E)
- Cedar Vale Road Park (27.8712°S 153.0077°E)
- Harrison Road Park (27.8901°S 153.0394°E)
- Kamala Court Park (27.8676°S 153.0002°E)
- Millstream Road Park (27.8738°S 153.0187°E)
- Quail Street Park (27.8839°S 153.0226°E)
