= Woodhill, Queensland =

Woodhill
- Suburb
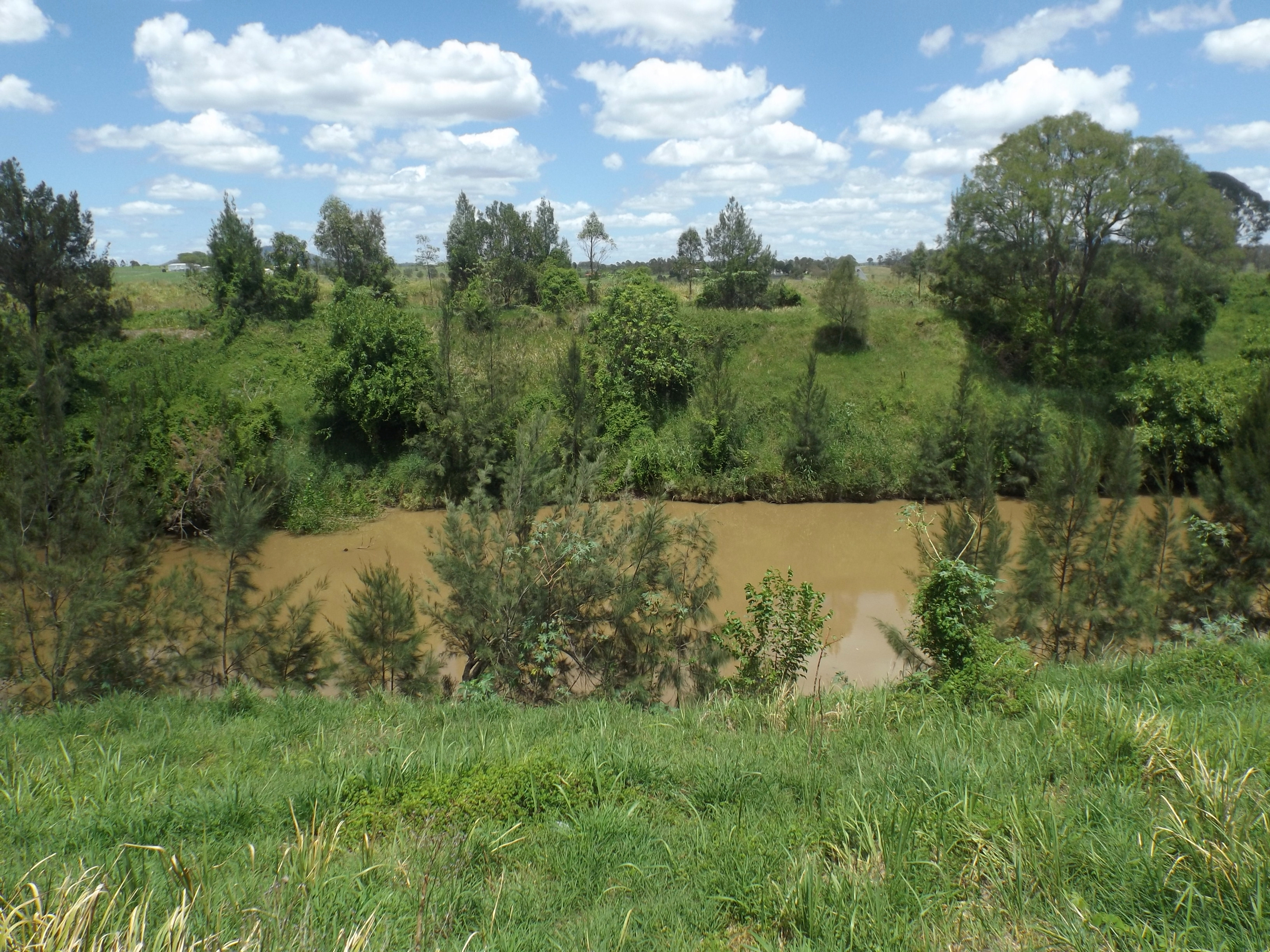
- Logan River, 2016

- Interactive map of Woodhill
- Coordinates: 27.8852°S 152.9733°E
- Country: Australia
- State: Queensland
- City: Logan City
- LGA: Logan City
- Location: 11.8 km (7.3 mi) N of Beaudesert; 16.0 km (9.9 mi) S of Flagstone; 37.4 km (23.2 mi) SSW of Logan Central; 57.4 km (35.7 mi) S of Brisbane CBD

Government
  - State electorate: Scenic Rim
  - Federal division: Wright

Area
  - Total: 13.4 km^{2} (5.2 sq mi)

Population
  - Total: 1,231 (2021 census)
  - Density: 91.9/km^{2} (237.9/sq mi)
- Time zone: UTC+10:00 (AEST)
- Postcode: 4285
Suburbs around Woodhill
Kagaru	Cedar Grove	Cedar Vale
Allenview	Woodhill	Veresdale Scrub
Allenview	Veresdale	Veresdale

Woodhill is a rural locality in the City of Logan, Queensland, Australia. In the 2021 census, Woodhill had a population of 1,231 people.

== Geography ==
The Logan River forms the western boundary.

The Mount Lindesay Highway enters the locality from the north-east (Cedar Grove / Cedar Vale) and exits to the south (Veresdale).

== History ==
Woodhill evolved from the Townsvale plantation, which was established in 1862; Woodhill was the property name of the Ferguson Family.

David and Jane Ferguson donated land for the cemetery, when their 11-year-old son George died after falling from a horse on 13 March 1873. The Woodhill Cemetery was gazetted on 26 April 1879, although it was called the Veresdale Cemetery at the time.

Townsvale National School opened on 2 June 1873. On 1 January 1874 it became Veresdale State School. In 1899 it was renamed Woodhill State School.

Woodhill railway station (27.8931°S 152.9731°E) was on the disused Beaudesert railway line from Bethania to Beaudesert. The line opened on 16 May 1888.

The suburb was officially named and bounded on 24 April 1997.

Formerly in the Shire of Beaudesert, Woodhill became part of Logan City following the local government amalgamations in March 2008.

== Demographics ==
In the 2011 census, Woodhill had a population of 423 people, 47.8% female and 52.2% male. The median age of the Woodhill population was 39 years, 2 years above the national median of 37. 84.6% of people living in Woodhill were born in Australia. The other top responses for country of birth were England 3.8%, New Zealand 3.5%, Belgium 0.7%, Malta 0.7% and the Netherlands 0.7%. 95.0% of people spoke only English at home; the only other response for language spoken at home was 0.9% Dutch.

In the 2016 census, Woodhill had a population of 723 people, 48.8% female and 51.2% male. The median age of the Woodhill population was 33 years, 5 years below the national median of 38. 77.2% of people living in Woodhill were born in Australia. The other top responses for country of birth were England 7.4%, New Zealand 4.2%, Scotland 0.6%, Thailand 0.6% and Samoa 0.4%. 91.2% of people spoke only English at home; the next most common languages were 0.8% Spanish, 0.4% German, 0.4% Japanese and 0.4% Samoan.

In the 2021 census, Woodhill had a population of 1,231 people, 48.9% female and 51.1% male. The median age of the Woodhill population was 31 years, 7 years below the national median of 38. 81.2% of people living in Woodhill were born in Australia. The other top responses for country of birth were New Zealand 6.2%, England 4.1%, South Africa 0.5%, Zimbabwe 0.5%, and Samoa 0.4%. 91.3% of people spoke only English at home; the next most common languages were 0.7% Spanish, 0.6% Afrikaans, 0.5% German, 0.4% Greek, and 0.4% Hungarian.

== Education ==
Woodhill State School is a government primary (Prep-6) school for boys and girls at 6027 Mount Lindesay Highway (27.8929°S 152.9737°E). In 2018, the school had an enrolment of 211 students with 16 teachers (14 full-time equivalent) and 13 non-teaching staff (8 full-time equivalent).

There are no secondary schools in Woodhill. The nearest government secondary schools are Beaudesert State High School in Beaudesert to the south-east and Flagstone State Community College in Flagstone to the north.
