= Veresdale Scrub, Queensland =

Veresdale Scrub
- Suburb
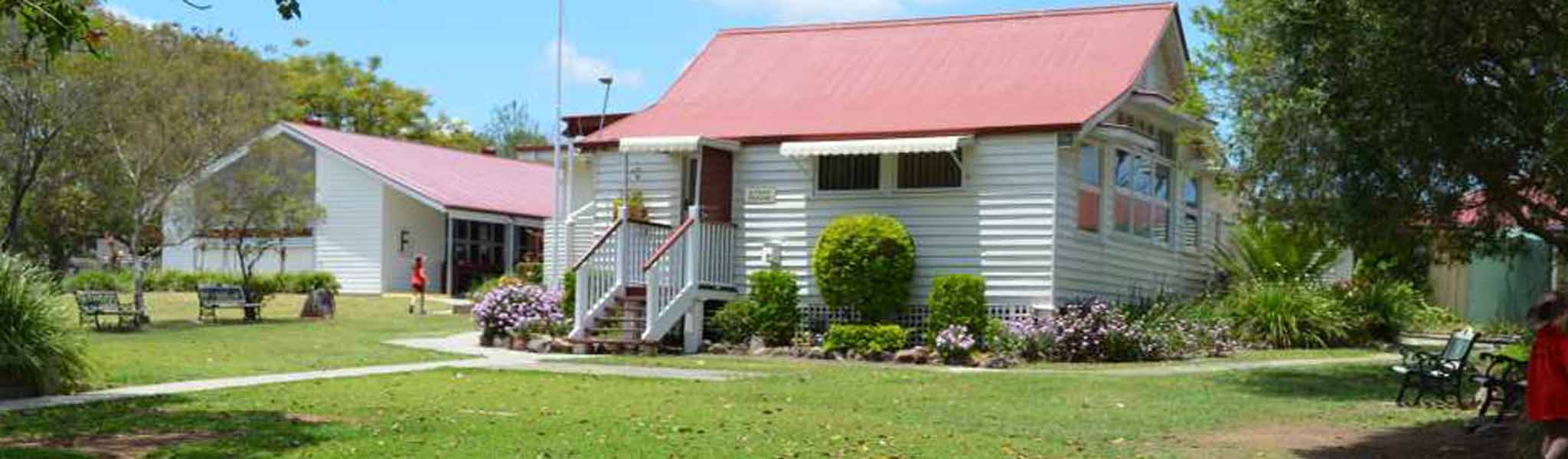
- Veresdale Scrub State School, 2020

- Interactive map of Veresdale Scrub
- Coordinates: 27.9188°S 153.0147°E
- Country: Australia
- State: Queensland
- LGAs: Scenic Rim Region; Logan City
- Location: 10.5 km (6.5 mi) N of Beaudesert; 59.4 km (36.9 mi) S of Brisbane CBD

Government
  - State electorate: Scenic Rim
  - Federal division: Wright

Area
  - Total: 16.2 km^{2} (6.3 sq mi)

Population
  - Total: 548 (2021 census)
  - Density: 33.83/km^{2} (87.6/sq mi)
- Time zone: UTC+10:00 (AEST)
- Postcode: 4285
Suburbs around Veresdale Scrub
Woodhill	Cedar Vale	Cedar Vale
Veresdale	Veresdale Scrub	Mundoolun
Veresdale	Veresdale	Birnam

Veresdale Scrub is a rural locality split between the Scenic Rim Region and the City of Logan, both in Queensland, Australia. In the 2021 census, Veresdale Scrub had a population of 548 people.

== Geography ==
Mount Dunsinane (also known as Birnam Hill) lies of the south-eastern boundary of the locality with Birnam. (27.9267°S 153.0403°E) and rises to a height of 321 metres (1,053 ft) above sea level.

There are many small creeks flowing through the locality which ultimately contribute to the Logan River within the North East Coast drainage basin.

Veresdale Scrub Road enters the localiy from the south (Veresdale) and travels north towards the northern boundary of the locality, where it terminates.

The land use is predominantly grazing on native vegetion with some rural residential housing in the south-east of the locality.

== History ==
Veresdale Scrub Provisional School opened on 25 April 1899. On 1 January 1909, it became Veresdale Scrub State School.

The Veresdale Scrub Hall was officially opened on Wednesday, 27 November 1929, by Joseph Hopkins, the chairman of the Beaudesert Shire Council.

Formerly in the Shire of Beaudesert, Veresdale Scrub was split between Logan City and Scenic Rim Region following the local government amalgamations in March 2008.

== Demographics ==
In the 2011 census, Veresdale Scrub had a population of 620 people

In the 2016 census, Veresdale Scrub had a population of 481 people. Note that the geographic boundaries for the census area changed in 2016, so earlier data is not directly comparable.

In the 2021 census, Veresdale Scrub had a population of 548 people.

== Education ==
Veresdale Scrub State School is a government primary (Prep-6) school for boys and girls at 354 Veresdale Scrub School Road (27.9214°S 153.0176°E). In 2018, the school had an enrolment of 124 students with 11 teachers (8 full-time equivalent) and 11 non-teaching staff (5 full-time equivalent).

There are no secondary schools in Veresdale Scrub. The nearest government secondary school is Beaudesert State High School in Beaudesert to the south.

== Amenities ==
Veresdale Scrub Dance Hall is at 454 Veresdale Scrub Road (27.9215°S 153.01281°E). Dances are held on Saturday nights, but since May 2020 have been suspended due to the COVID-19 pandemic.
