= Gleneagle, Queensland =

Gleneagle
- Suburb
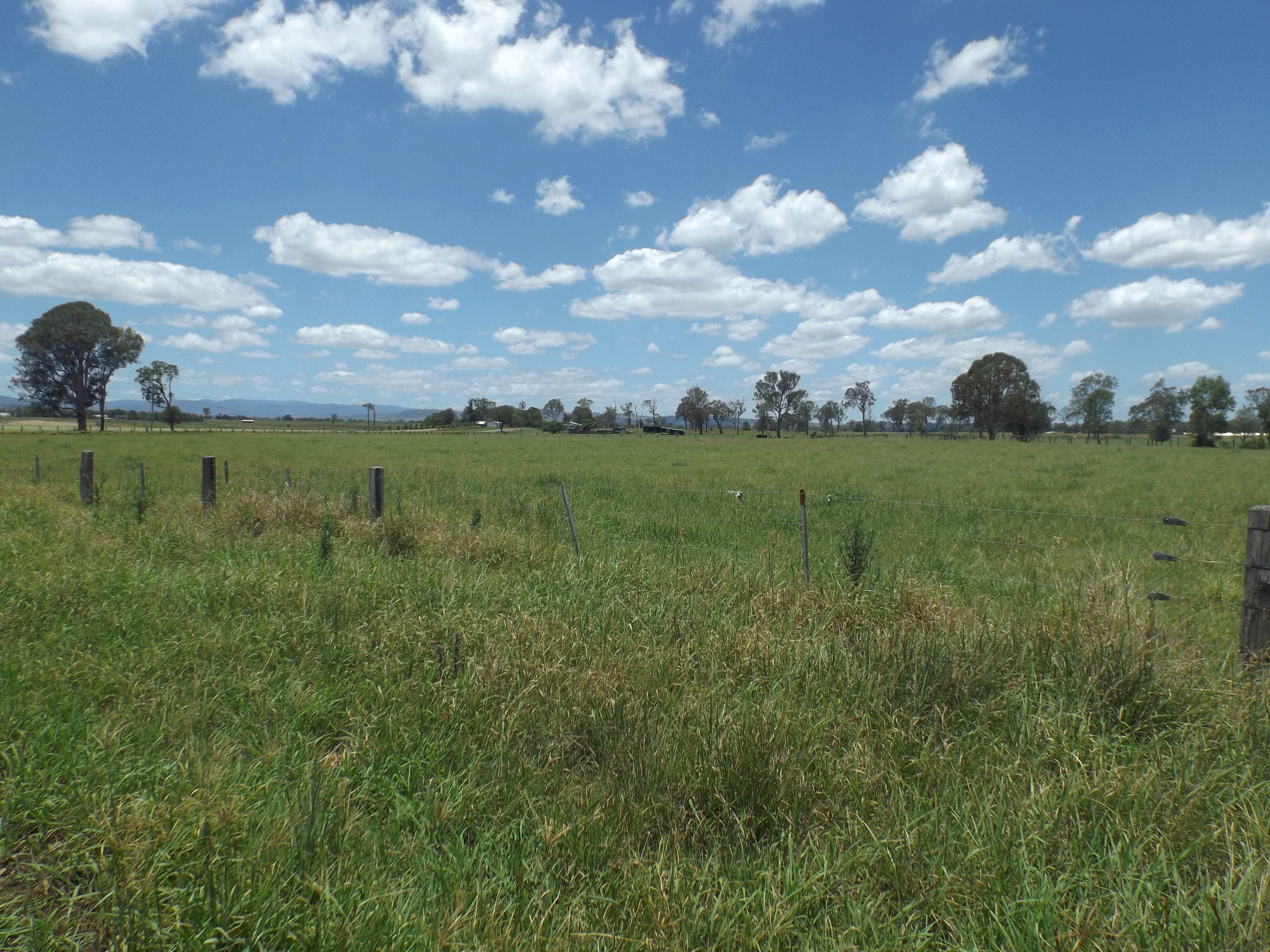
- Fields along Alan Creek Road, 2016

- Interactive map of Gleneagle
- Coordinates: 27.9405°S 152.9616°E
- Country: Australia
- State: Queensland
- City: Scenic Rim Region
- LGA: Scenic Rim Region
- Location: 11.2 km (7.0 mi) NNW of Beaudesert; 65.7 km (40.8 mi) S of Brisbane CBD

Government
  - State electorate: Scenic Rim
  - Federal division: Wright

Area
  - Total: 31.2 km^{2} (12.0 sq mi)

Population
  - Total: 2,106 (2021 census)
  - Density: 67.50/km^{2} (174.8/sq mi)
- Time zone: UTC+10:00 (AEST)
- Postcode: 4285
Suburbs around Gleneagle
Allenview	Veresdale	Veresdale
Allenview	Gleneagle	Veresdale
Bromelton	Bromelton	Beaudesert

Gleneagle is a rural locality in the Scenic Rim Region, Queensland, Australia. In the 2021 census, Gleneagle had a population of 2,106 people.

== Geography ==
The Logan River and the Mount Lindesay Highway pass through eastern parts of locality. Large sections of land are rural with some parts used for irrigated agriculture. A housing estate was established to the east of the highway. In the centre of Gleneagle is a large man-made dam called Lake Brabazon. The western boundary follows the Sydney–Brisbane railway line.Gin Gin, Queensland.

== History ==
The locality takes its name from a cotton farm called Glen Eagles established in the 1860s by William Tutin Walker (1833-1920). Walker began as a manager on Townsvale established by Robert Towns who pioneered cotton growing in the Logan River valley. Townsvale was in the area of the present-day localities of Gleneagle and Veresdale. After Towns' death, Walker took over Townsvale.

St Joseph's Catholic Church was the first Catholic church in the Logan River valley and was opened in 1876 on a 4-acre (1.6 ha) site, then known as Tullamore Hill, later as Veresdale, and now within Gleneagle. The site for the church was donated by William Rafter, whose residence was called Tullamore after his home town Tullamore in Ireland. Tullamore was the major centre of the district (prior to the rise of Beaudesert as the major centre). A cemetery was established behind the church. On 2 June 1889 Roman Catholic Archbishop Robert Dunne blessed the Catholic cemetery (now known as the Gleneagle Catholic Cemetery). In 1936 the church was lined and ceiled for the first time. By the early 1950s the smal church was in poor repair and it had a very small congregation (St Mary's Catholic Church in Beaudesert was very large and by then the major town of the district). At that time, Mass was being held regularly at the O'Reilly Guesthouse in Goblin Wood, the private home of Bernard O'Reilly. So it was decided to relocate St Joseph's to the O'Reilly Guesthouse as a permanent church. It was dismantled, transported and re-assembled. On 27 November 1955, Father Steele presided over the first Mass in the relocated church (28.2309°S 153.1351°E) and Archbishop James Duhig performed the opening ceremony. Although privately owned by the O'Reilly family, it is still strongly associated with the Beaudesert Catholic parish. In 1983 the Catholic cemetery at Waterford West was sold by the Catholic Church for re-development; graves marked with headstones were exhumed and relocated to Gleneagle Catholic Cemetery.

Gleneagle railway station (27.9353°S 152.9811°E) was on the disused Beaudesert railway line from Bethania to Beaudesert. The line opened on 16 May 1888.

Gleneagle Provisional School opened on 18 March 1891. It closed circa 1899. In 1902 it reopened as Gleneagle Provisional School and on 1 January 1909 became Gleneagle State School.

Allen's Creek Provisional School opened on 4 October 1927 and closed on 18 September 1929. It was a railway camp school and provided schooling for children of workers building the Sydney–Brisbane rail corridor. Allan's Creek (as it is currently spelled) crosses the railway line at the intersection of three present-day localities: Allenview, Bromelton and Gleneagle.

== Demographics ==
In the 2016 census, Gleneagle had a population of 1,877 people. The locality contained 651 households, in which 48.9% of the population were males and 51.1% of the population were females with a median age of 33, 5 years below the national average. The average weekly household income was $1,332, $106 below the national average. 3.7% of Gleneagle's population was either of Aborigional or Torres Strait Islander descent. The most common nominated ancestries were Australian (36.3%), English (29.8%) and Scottish (7.9%), while the most common country of birth was Australia (83.5%), and the most commonly spoken language at home was English (91.4%). The most common nominated religions were No religion (27.4%), Catholic (22.0%) and Anglican (20.1%).

In the 2021 census, Gleneagle had a population of 2,106 people.

== Education ==
Gleneagle State School is a government primary (Prep-6) school for boys and girls at 126-146 Mount Lindesay Highway (27.9378°S 152.9824°E). In 2017, the school had an enrolment of 211 students with 17 teachers (14 full-time equivalent) and 9 non-teaching staff (5 full-time equivalent).

There are no secondary schools in Gleneagle; the nearest one is Beaudesert State High School in neighbouring Beaudesert.

== Amenities ==
The Gleneagle Catholic cemetery at 6659 Mount Lindesay Highway (27.9464°S 152.9857°E) is operated by the Beaudesert Catholic parish.
