= Beaudesert railway line =

Former branch railway in South East Queensland, Australia

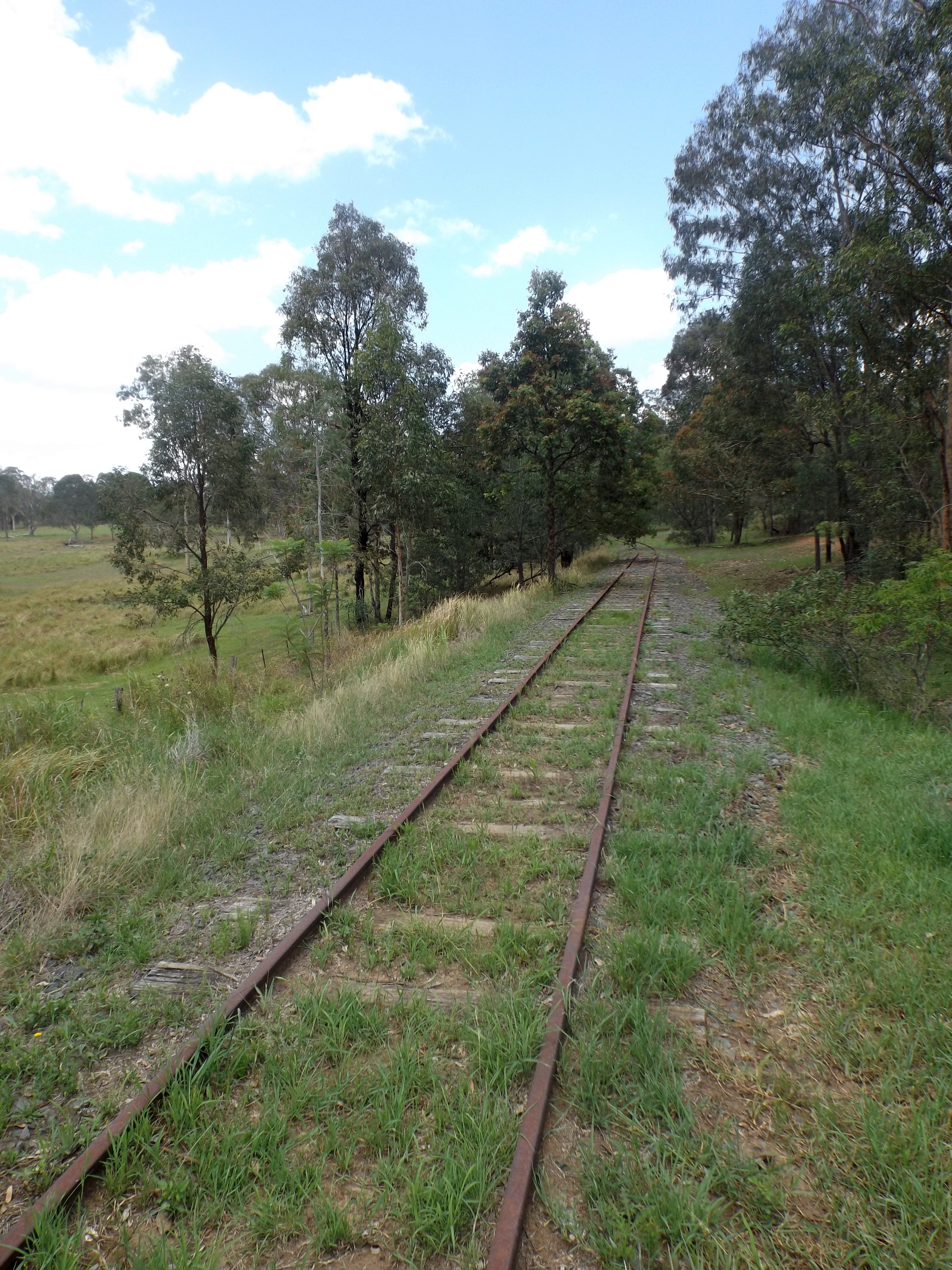
- Section of abandoned track at Cedar Grove

Overview
- Status: Disused

History
- Opened: 15 May 1888 (revenue service); 18 December 2002 (tourist service)
- Closed: 1961 (passenger service); 20 May 1996 (freight service); August 2004 (tourist service).

Technical
- Line length: 43 km (27 mi)
- Track length: 43 km (27 mi)
- Track gauge: 1,067 mm (3 ft 6 in)

The Beaudesert railway line (also known as the Upper Logan railway line) is a disused branch railway in South East Queensland, Australia. The first section opened in 1885 between Bethania and Logan Village, the line completed in 1888 with the extension to the terminus of Beaudesert and operated as a Queensland Government Railways (QGR) line until 1996 (Passenger service ceased in 1961). A heritage operation was undertaken from 2002 to 2005. The QR Canungra branch line junctioned from the Beaudesert branch at Logan Village and operated between 1915 and 1955, and the Beaudesert Shire Tramway connected with the terminus between 1903 and 1944. A study was undertaken in 2010 by the Queensland government concerning a potential Salisbury-to-Beaudesert rail corridor as a long-term potential proposal.

== Route ==
The 43 kilometre-long line commenced at Bethania railway station (27.6884°S 153.1585°E) 35 kilometres (22 mi) south of Brisbane. It branches off the Beenleigh Line at a triangular junction immediately south of Bethania station (27.6901°S 153.1600°E) then progresses generally south-west to Jimboomba and then generally south to its terminus at Beaudesert, on the following route.

Point of interest	Coordinates	Notes
Logan River Road crossing	27.6963°S 153.1554°E	
Waterford railway station	27.7047°S 153.1481°E	
Buccan railway station	27.7517°S 153.1253°E	
Logan Village railway station	27.7686°S 153.1081°E	
junction with the Canungra railway line	27.7707°S 153.1069°E	
site for future station just north of Camp Cable Road	27.8041°S 153.0597°E	
Jimboomba railway station	27.8300°S 153.0333°E	
Cedar Grove railway station (listed as Cedar Pocket South railway station in 1888)	27.8617°S 152.9919°E	
Woodhill railway station	27.8931°S 152.9731°E	
Veresdale railway station	27.9086°S 152.9778°E	
Gleneagle railway station	27.9353°S 152.9811°E	
Beaudesert railway station	27.9853°S 152.9950°E	

== History ==
In 1877, a line was proposed from Wacol to Logan Village, Beaudesert and Tamrookum. A trial survey was taken around 1881 with the route commencing from Goodna. This line proposed 1-in-30 (~3.3%) grades, the steepest on the QGR system at the time, as well as requiring a bridge over the Logan River.

The line as built commenced at Bethania on the Beenleigh railway line, south of the Logan River and had the advantage of being a shorter distance of new construction. The section from Bethania to Logan Village was opened on 21 September 1885, with the Logan Village to Beaudesert section opened on 16 May 1888.

Initially trains were 'mixed' (i.e. consisting of both passenger carriages and goods wagons) until 1929, from when passenger services used rail motors.

Use of the passenger services declined with the increasing ownership of cars following World War II, leading to the termination of passenger services in 1961. However, the Beaudesert abattoir and local dairy farmers continued to use the freight services on the line until freight services terminated on 20 May 1996.

The line was unused until Beaudesert railway enthusiasts obtained an Australian Government grant to establish Beaudesert Rail to operate the line as a heritage tourism service.

== Beaudesert Rail ==
In 2001, a grant provided by the federal government was approved for local group ‘Beaudesert Shire Railway Support Group’, trading as Beaudesert Rail (BR). Their aim was to provide a heritage rail experience along the length of the branch. The group acquired rolling stock from Queensland, New South Wales, Victoria, an ex-Queensland Rail C17 number 967 from Alice Springs, NT and an 11 class diesel locomotive, number 1105, purchased from former Tasmania’s Emu Bay Railway. The rail bridges were strengthened, most evidently at Waters Creek, Beaudesert to permit the use of a class C17 steam locomotive; a locomotive having previously never seen use on this particular branch due to its axle loading exceeding the rating of the railway. Originally the branch only permitted PB15s, B13s, B15s and 60t diesels to traverse the line. Track work was contracted to Queensland Rail to re-sleeper and ballast the 43km branch line. Local community members and work for the dole programs constructed new platforms, restored rolling stock and station buildings, and tended to gardens. A new station building at Logan Village was erected, the former Park Road, Platform 1 station building. Local Beaudesert metal fabricators were tasked with rebuilding C17 967 with the aid of fitters from Ipswich Workshops and Boilerland, Virginia restoring the boiler for 967.

Beaudesert Rail’s first revenue service was on 18 December 2002 from Beaudesert to Logan Village and back. The train consisted of 11 class 1105, SEK 490, CSV 1053, FBS 1242, BU 1071, BUV 1345, BU 1416. On 8 March 2003, Beaudesert Rail commenced steam-hauled services with their C17 967. Built by Walkers Limited in Maryborough, 967 was in service for 19 years before being plinthed in Happy Valley Park, Bulcock Beach Caloundra. In 1985, 967 was transferred to the Ghan Railway Preservation Society, Alice Springs before being purchased by Beaudesert Rail in 2000 and road hauled to Beaudesert. Beaudesert Rail commenced services to Bethania on 4 April 2003. However, on Saturday 28 June 2003, 1105, BUV 1345 and BU 1071 derailed on a left hand curve south of Easterly Street, Waterford, halting all further passenger services. The findings of the final Queensland Transport report found that the condition of track infrastructure approaching and through the point of derailment was too poorly secured with rail fasteners/sleepers and showed signs of excessive lateral movement caused by many decades of use. Post derailment, revenue services continued, however, they were restricted to the Logan Village to Beaudesert section with a 25 km/h speed restriction implemented across the whole branch.

On 25 August 2004, a suspicious bridge fire at Scrubby Creek, Cedar Vale suspended Beaudesert Rails operations. With $250,000 worth of damage, Beaudesert Rail were in an unfit position to pay for bridge repairs, sealing the end of just over 20 months’ worth of operations on the Beaudesert branch. Beaudesert Rail further experienced financial problems and liquidators took over in February 2005. Beaudesert Rail’s final passenger service between Beaudesert and Logan Village was on Wednesday 15 August 2004 and a final push for public support which proved hopeful with a large turnout was with a family fundraiser held at Beaudesert station on Australia Day 2005. An auction held in mid 2005 saw much of Beaudesert Rail’s assets sold, with the Zig Zag Railway in Lithgow, New South Wales acquiring carriages SEK 490 (Commissioner’s Carriage), CSV 1053 (Hughenden Carriage) and BUV 1345 for use on their Blue Mountains system. Mary Valley Heritage Railway (MVHR) acquired BU 1413 (McDonald’s-themed carriage for children’s parties), BU 1416 and BU 1071. FBS 1242, DAS 1134 and BLV 734 were all privately purchased. C17 967 was transferred to Queensland Rail’s Ipswich Workshops on 27 March 2006 and later tendered out with MVHR, Gympie being the successful bidders. 11 class 1105 was purchased by Cairns Rail for use on their cement trains between Woree and Cairns.

== Remains ==
By 2024, the Beaudesert branch had been fully decommissioned, with the removal of 43 kilometres of line including rails, sleepers and associated track gear excluding bridges. The corridor is overgrown and many sections are utilised for livestock grazing. Some sections have been reclaimed by TMR for road upgrades, most notably south of Logan Village, with the new southbound lanes of Waterford - Tamborine Road situated over the former rail corridor. The Beaudesert rail precinct has recently been replaced with new carparks and gardens. The old station building remains, leased to Rod Anderson Constructions, is surrounded by historical photo boards as a reminder of a time when the railway was the lifeblood of the town. Waters Creek, north of Beaudesert, is one of few reminders of the short-lived Beaudesert Rail operation, with a large steel girder span crossing the creek. The branch is currently undergoing transformation into a future Rail Trail, linking up with the short Logan Village - Yarrabilba Rail Trail on the former Canungra branch.

== Proposed Salisbury to Beaudesert line ==
In 2010, a Queensland Government study proposed a new passenger railway line to Beaudesert utilising (and potentially duplicating and electrifying) the dual gauge line from Salisbury to Kagaru, then a new alignment to Veresdale, where the final ~9 km original alignment to Beaudesert would be utilised.

In November 2019, the Queensland Government and federal government agreed to equally co-fund a $20 million business case to investigate the construction of two electrified narrow-gauge passenger tracks from Salisbury to Beaudesert and two dual-gauge freight tracks between Acacia Ridge and Kagaru, a corridor which is being proposed for the Inland Rail project. A summary report was release in September 2024, recommending that the corridor be protected.

== See also ==
- Rail transport in Queensland
