= Allenview, Queensland =

Allenview
- Suburb
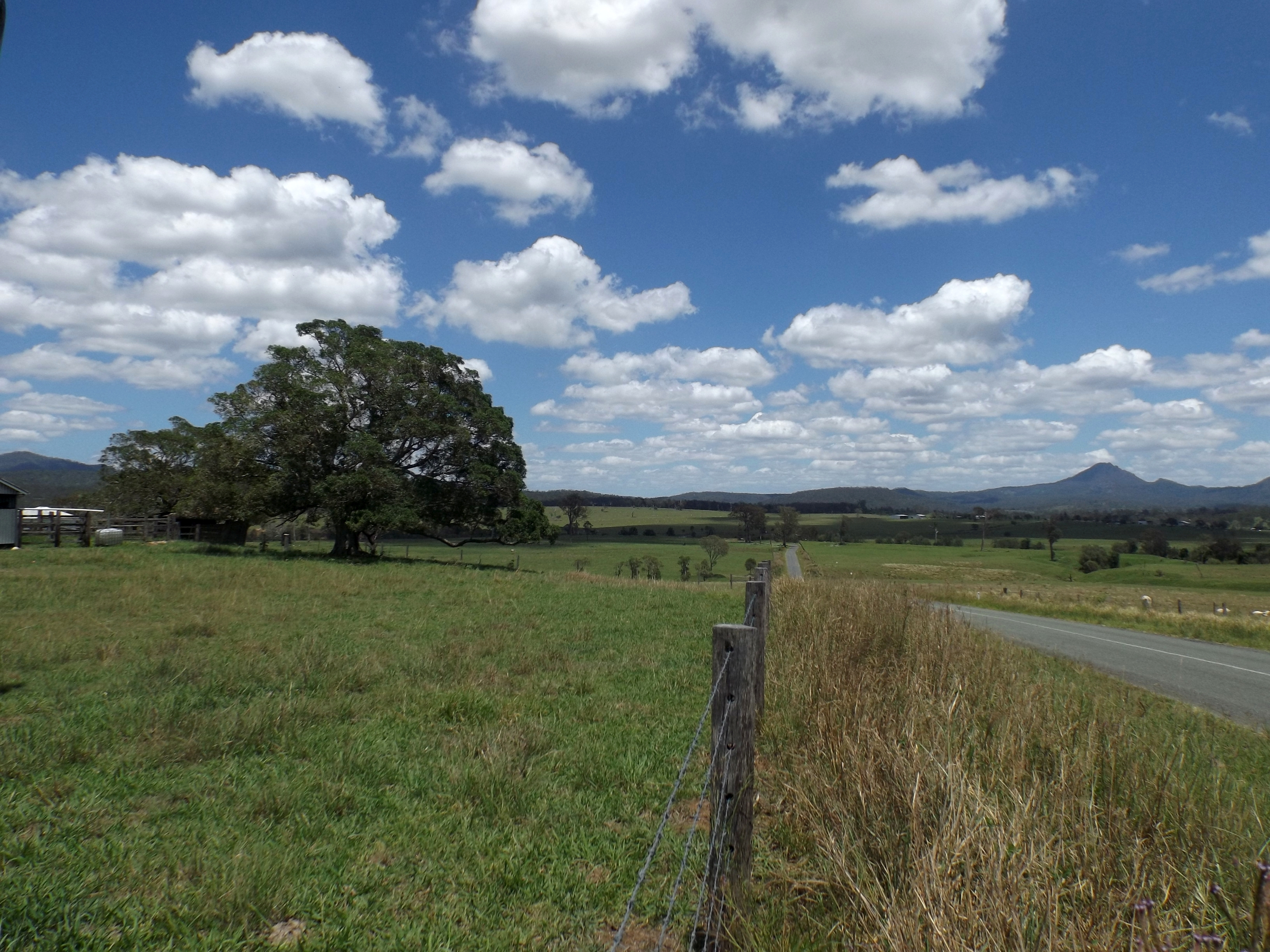
- Brookland Road, 2016

- Interactive map of Allenview
- Coordinates: 27.9119°S 152.9166°E
- Country: Australia
- State: Queensland
- City: Scenic Rim Region
- LGA: Scenic Rim Region
- Location: 12.5 km (7.8 mi) S of Flagstone; 15.6 km (9.7 mi) NNW of Beaudesert; 60.4 km (37.5 mi) SSW of Brisbane

Government
  - State electorate: Scenic Rim
  - Federal division: Wright

Area
  - Total: 43.6 km^{2} (16.8 sq mi)

Population
  - Total: 209 (2021 census)
  - Density: 4.794/km^{2} (12.42/sq mi)
- Time zone: UTC+10:00 (AEST)
- Postcode: 4285
Suburbs around Allenview
Kagaru	Kagaru	Cedar Grove
Wyaralong	Allenview	Woodhill; Veresdale
Bromelton	Bromelton	Gleneagle

Allenview is a rural locality in the Scenic Rim Region, Queensland, Australia. In the 2021 census, Allenview had a population of 209 people.

== Geography ==
Most of the eastern boundary is marked by the Logan River where irrigated agriculture is the predominant land use. The North Coast railway line also marks a section of the eastern boundary. In the west is the Wyaralong Dam and Teviot Brook which aligns with a small section of the western boundary. Allan's Creek (as it is currently spelled) crosses the railway line at the intersection of three present-day localities: Allenview, Bromelton and Gleneagle.

== History ==
Brooklands State School opened on 3 October 1910 and closed in 1965. It was located at approximately 637 Brookland Road (27.8738°S 152.9331°E).

Allen's Creek Provisional School opened on 4 October 1927 and closed on 18 September 1929. It was a railway camp school and provided schooling for children of workers building the Sydney–Brisbane rail corridor.

== Demographics ==
In the 2016 census, Allenview had a population of 184 people. The locality contained 68 households, in which 51.1% of the population were males and 48.9% of the population were females with a median age of 43, 5 above the national average. The average weekly household income was $1,724, $286 above the national average.

In the 2021 census, Allenview had a population of 209 people.

== Education ==
There are no schools in Allenview. The nearest government primary schools are Woodhill State School in neighbouring Woodhill to the east and Gleneagle State School in neighbouring Gleneagle to the south-east. The nearest government secondary schools are Flagstone State Community College in Flagstone to the north and Beaudesert State High School in Beaudesert to the south-east.
