= St John's Church, Mundoolun =

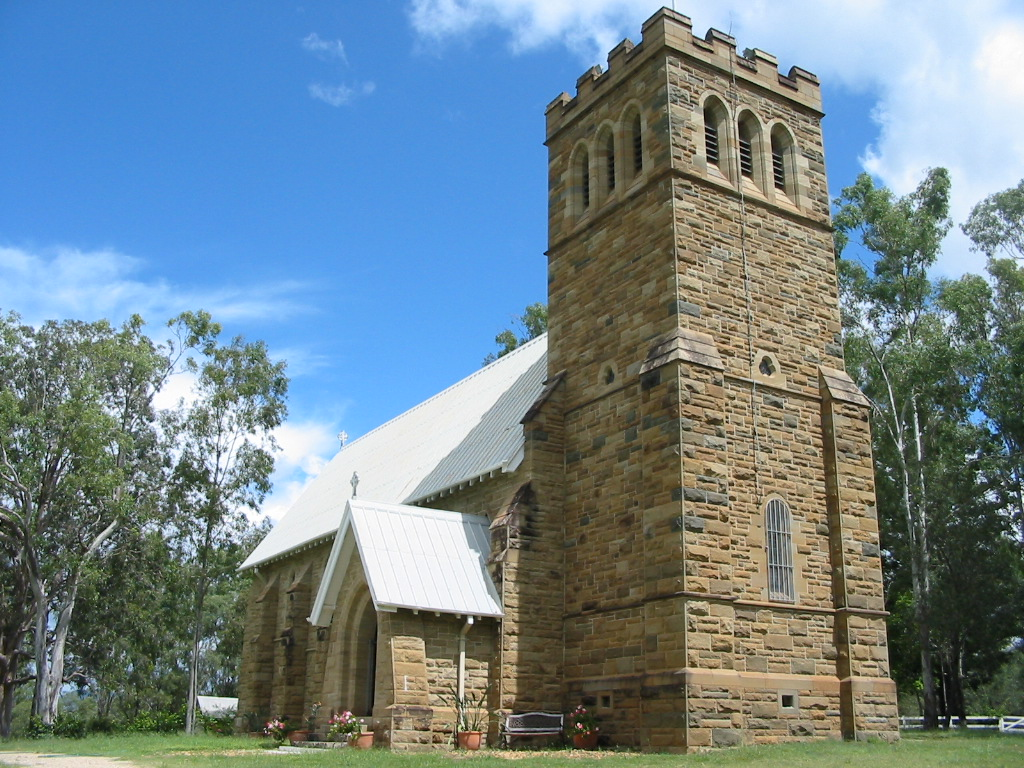
- St John the Evangelist Church, Mundoolun, 2006

- Location within Queensland Location within Australia
- 27.9017°S 153.0887°E
- Location: Mundoolun Road, Mundoolun, City of Logan, Queensland, Australia

History
- Design period: 1900 - 1914 (early 20th century)
- Built: 1901 - 1915

Site notes
- Architect: John Hingeston Buckeridge
- Architectural style: Gothic

Queensland Heritage Register
- Official name: St John's Church, Memorial Church of St John the Evangelist
- Type: state heritage (landscape, built)
- Designated: 26 November 1999
- Reference no.: 601082
- Significant period: 1900s
- Significant components: cemetery, tree groups - avenue of, church, tower, views to, furniture/fittings

St John's Church is a heritage-listed Anglican church at Mundoolun Road, Mundoolun, City of Logan, Queensland, Australia. It was designed by John Hingeston Buckeridge and built from 1901 to 1915. It is also known as Memorial Church of St John the Evangelist. It was added to the Queensland Heritage Register on 26 November 1999.

== History ==
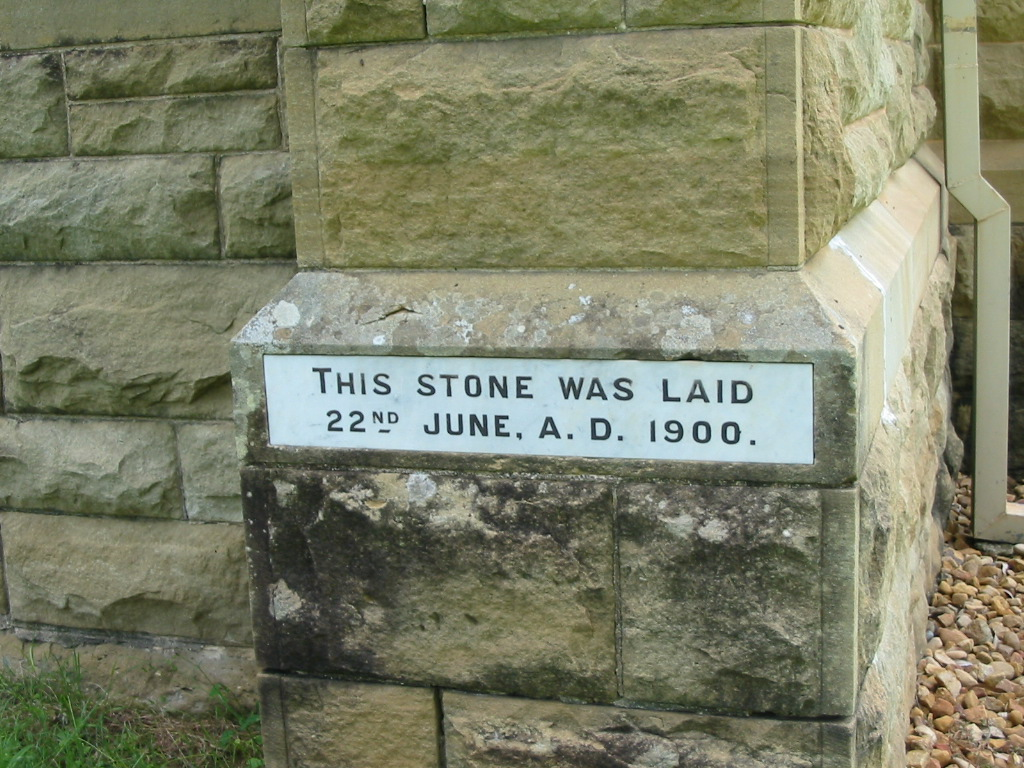
Foundation stone, 2006

St. John's Church at Mundoolun is a private family chapel built in 1901 on a property settled by the Collins family in the 1840s. The property is located between Canungra and Beaudesert in the Albert River Valley, South East Queensland. The church is constructed of local sandstone to the design of the Brisbane Diocesan Architect John Buckeridge who was commissioned by the Collins family in 1899.

The chapel was built as a memorial to John and Anne Collins by their children, soon after the death of John Collins in 1898. The Collins had arrived in Australia from Ireland in 1839, the same year that the closure of the Moreton Bay penal colony made way for settlement of the area within a fifty-mile radius of Brisbane. Anne's cousin, William Humphries, had taken up 17,000 acres at Mundoolun in 1842, a venture the Collins followed with great interest. In 1844, they joined him as partners and by 1847, the Collins had bought Humphries out. The family went on to be prominent pastoralists, eventually owning Tamrookum, Rathdowney and Nindooinbah, as well as the home station of Mundoolun.

The couple had five children. From 1863, when John Collins' sons joined him in the family business, they began to acquire properties further north and west. In 1877, Robert and William Collins formed the North Australian Pastoral Company in the Northern Territory with other shareholders and their interests and influence were wide-ranging. In 1878/79, Robert and William undertook a world tour which was to have a profound impact on Robert, in particular. In the United States, he was deeply impressed by the National Park movement and upon his return, began a serious campaign for the establishment of a national park in the McPherson Range. He continued this campaign until his death, becoming the Independent Member for Albert in the Queensland Legislative Assembly in 1896 and branch president of the Royal Geographical Society of Queensland in order to further his goal. Unfortunately he did not live to see the proclamation of Lamington National Park which eventually took place in 1915; however, he has been credited with the title of Father of the National Park Ideal.

At about the turn of the century, Mundoolun and the Collins family were at the peak of their success. It was decided by the five children that a memorial to their pioneering parents should be built. They selected a site on a ridge of the Birnam Range, near the small cemetery overlooking the homestead and the Albert Valley.

The family commissioned architect John Buckeridge to design the chapel. Buckeridge had come to Queensland in 1886 to supervise the construction of St.John's Cathedral in Brisbane. He had spent five years in the London office of leading ecclesiastical architect John Loughborough Pearson and came to Queensland on the recommendation of Pearson and the Archbishop of Canterbury to assist William Webber, the Bishop of Brisbane, in his ambitious building program for the diocese. Buckeridge was official Diocesan Architect from 1887 and erected about sixty wooden churches throughout Southern Queensland. He moved to Sydney in 1892 but continued as Diocesan Architect until 1902, delegating supervision of his plans to George Henry Male Addison and then Hall and Dods.

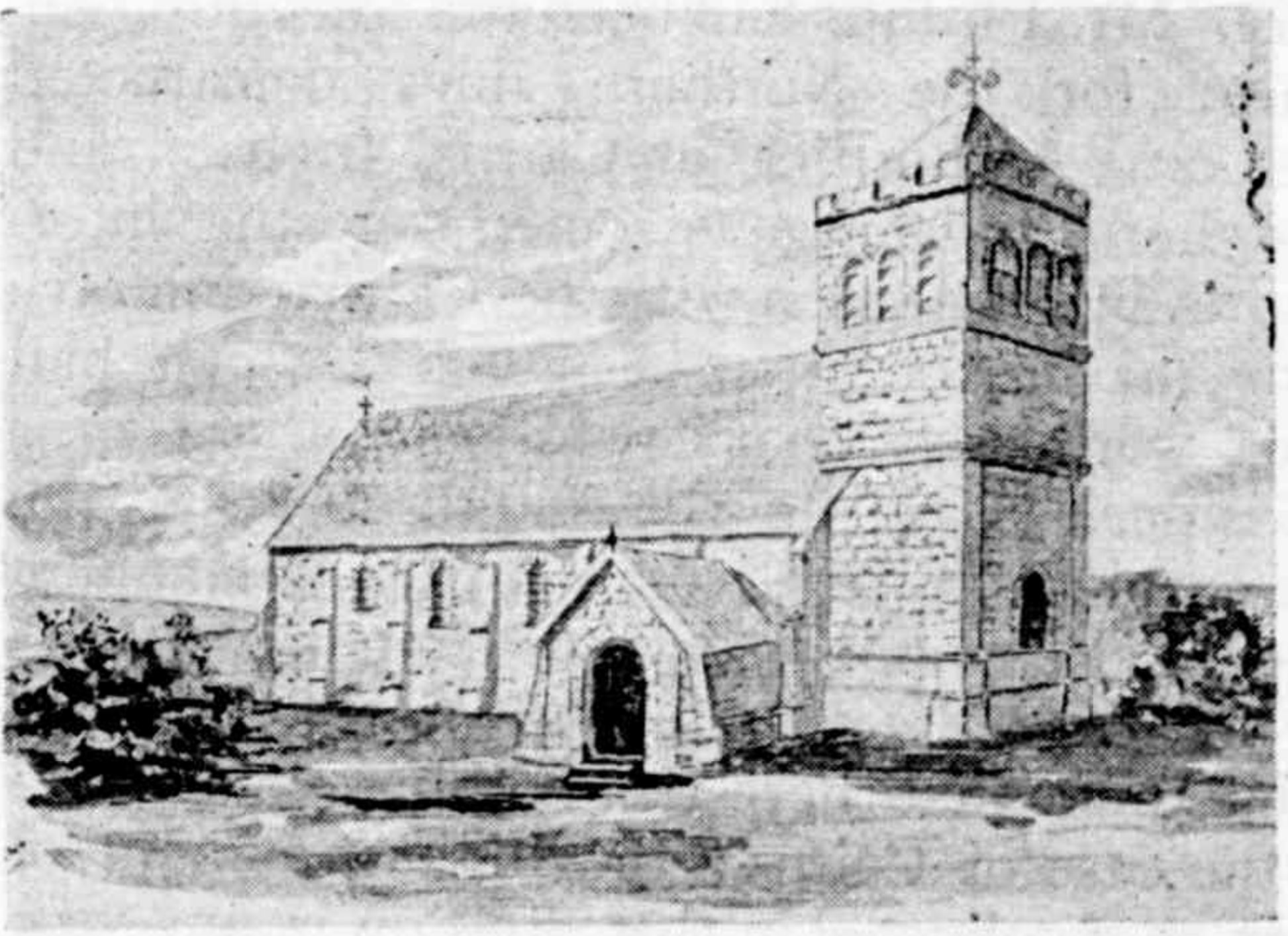
Sketch of the church during construction, 1900

Hence, it was architect Robin Dods who supervised the construction of St. John's, Mundoolun. Work began on 22 June 1900. The construction took nearly eighteen months to complete, with fifteen men employed almost continuously for this time. The local stone proved very hard to work and progress was slow. The sandstone was quarried from an area further along the spur on which the church was sited and was brought to the masons' shed by dray. The altar, lectern, prayer desk, seats, doors and ceiling timbers were made of red cedar felled at Tamborine Mountain.

The Archdeacon of Brisbane, Arthur Evan David, formally dedicated the church on St. John the Evangelist Day, 27 December 1901. However, the church wasn't consecrated until 29 August 1905, in a ceremony conducted by the Bishop of Brisbane. A tower was added in 1915 as a memorial to Robert Martin Collins who died in 1913. The footings for the tower had been laid in 1900 with the rest of the chapel, but took almost twenty years to be completed. Bells have never been installed. Services at that time were held in the church every second Sunday. More recently, the church has been used for weddings and other public events.

In 2015, St John's Church at Mundoolun is part of the Jimboomba Parish within the Anglican Archdiocese of Brisbane.

== Description ==
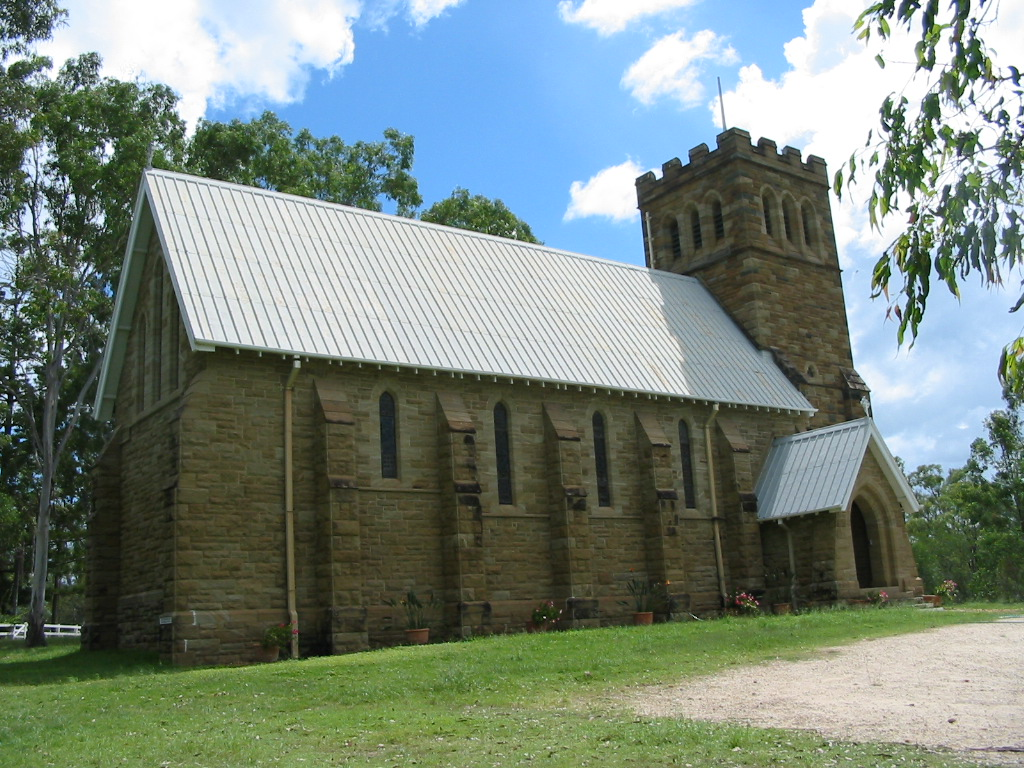
Side view of church, 2006

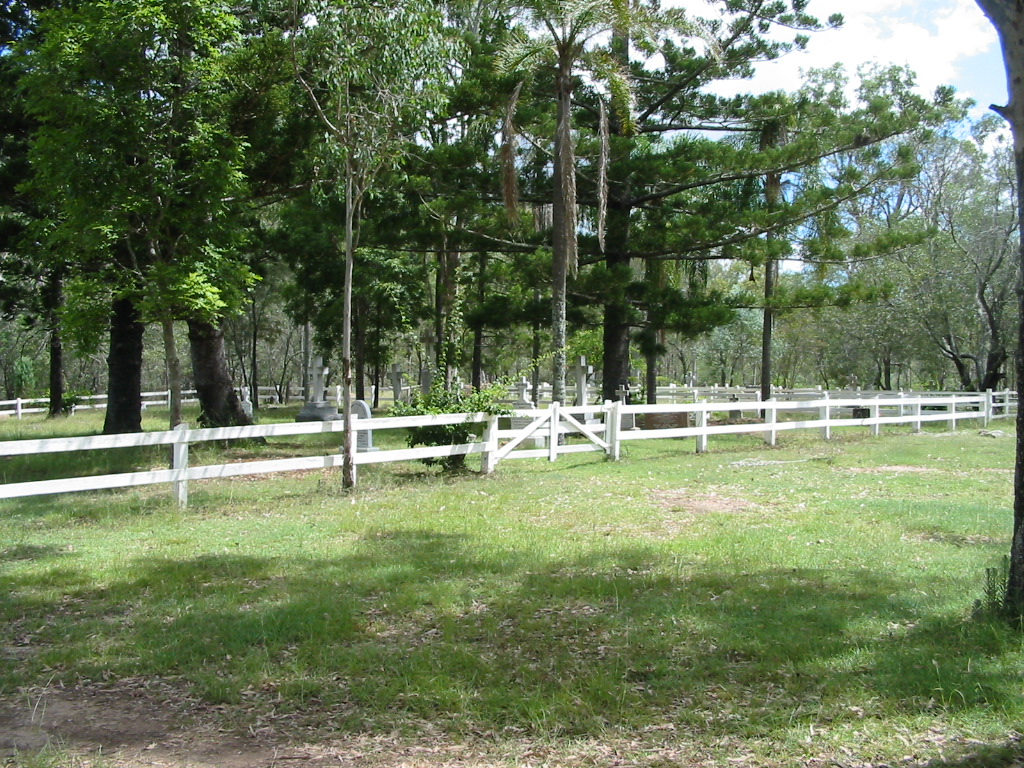
Cemetery beside the church, 2006

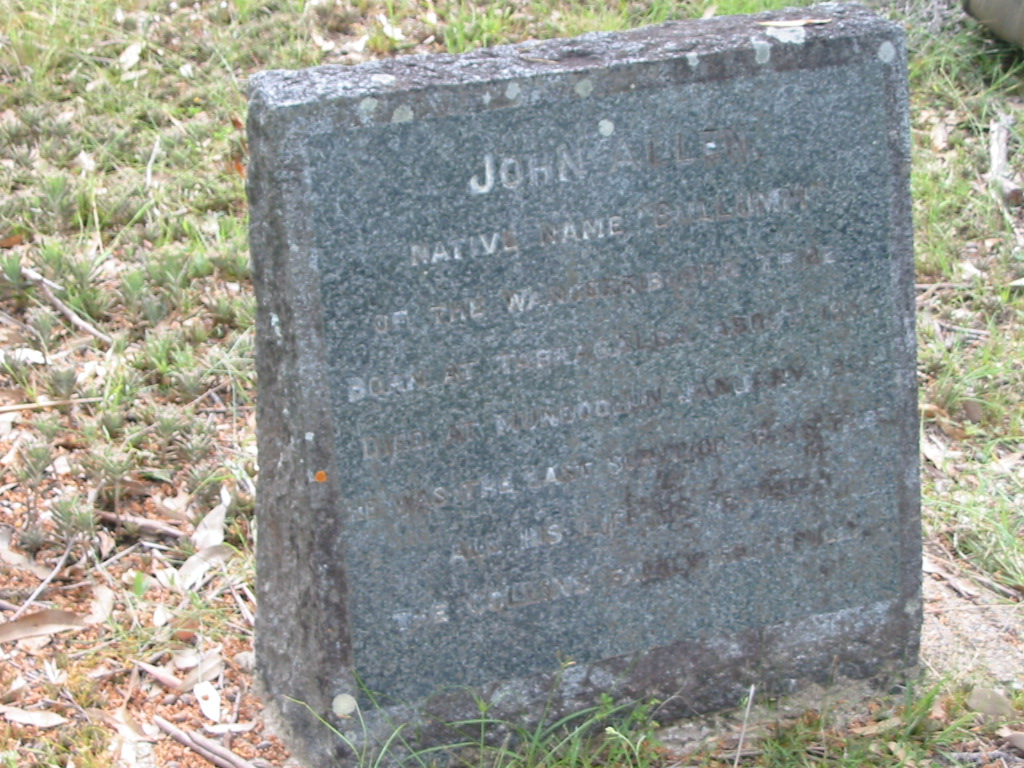
The inscription says "John Allen, native name BULLUMM of the Wangerriburra tribe, born at Tabragalla about 1851, died Mundoolan Jan 1931, he was the last survivor of his tribe, all his life he served the Collins faithfully"

St. John's Church, Mundoolun is a family chapel constructed of sandstone designed in Early English Gothic style to the design of John Buckeridge. It is sited on the rise of a hill with an avenue of hoop pine leading to the entry porch. A small cemetery, also planted with hoop pines, is located to the southwest of the church.

The church is simple in form but has a substantial quality that belies its size. It is orientated with the sanctuary to the southeast and comprises a combined nave and chancel, sanctuary, a southern vestry and northern porch attached, an organ chamber with a gallery and a western bell tower with a baptistry at its base. There is also a corrugated iron rainwater tank on the south side of the church.

The walls of the church are of random ashlar sandstone, their thickness indicating a rubble core. The stone is rough dressed with a birds eye texture on the exterior and smooth faced on the interior. Also on the exterior, window surrounds and buttress cappings are smooth tooled. The steeply pitched roof is clad with wide pan corrugated galvanised iron. The porch, vestry and organ chamber have separate gable roofs below the main roof eaves. The north porch ceiling is lined with v-jointed cedar boards and the ornate framed and boarded two-leaf porch door is also made of cedar. The outer porch door has been removed as a result of vandalism and has been replaced by a metal security screen door.

The walls of the tower are supported by buttresses. It has a castellated parapet and three belfry windows inset with timber louvres on each side. Lancet windows on each side of the church provide the only lighting for the church. Many of the windows have been replaced or repaired due to vandalism.

The interior is characterised by high quality joinery constructed of red cedar gained from the local district. The barrel vaulted ceiling of v-jointed cedar boards is supported by arched ribs, the vestry, porch and baptistry have flat ceilings also lined in cedar. The baptistry has a coffered ceiling with hinged sections, presumably to provide for bell ropes. The organ chamber has a stone vaulted ceiling. Pews, altar rails and other furniture are also of cedar. The floors of the chancel, sanctuary, baptistry and vestry are raised above the floor of the nave and along with the nave passage, are laid with carpet. Around the walls are memorial plaques to various local identities including members of the Collins family.

The small cemetery to the southwest of the church contains the graves of many members of the Collins family and their descendants, the Strachan, Delpratt and Balls families. Also buried here is Bullum, also known as John Allen, the last survivor of the Wangerriburra tribe who had a lifelong association with the family.

== Heritage listing ==
St John's Church was listed on the Queensland Heritage Register on 26 November 1999 having satisfied the following criteria.

The place is important in demonstrating the evolution or pattern of Queensland's history.

St. John's Church, Mundoolun is important in demonstrating the pattern of development of South-East Queensland, in particular the evolution of the pastoral district around Beaudesert.

The place demonstrates rare, uncommon or endangered aspects of Queensland's cultural heritage.

As a substantial masonry private family chapel, St John's Church, Mundoolun is a rare and uncommon type of building in Queensland.

The place is important in demonstrating the principal characteristics of a particular class of cultural places.

St. John's demonstrates the principal characteristics of an Early English Gothic Revival Church, specifically the use of lancet windows, simple rib vaults, buttresses and the addition of a square, castellated bell tower.

The place is important because of its aesthetic significance.

It has strong architectural and aesthetic qualities derived from an accomplished design, a combination of local materials and fine workmanship and an attractive, bucolic setting.

The place has a strong or special association with a particular community or cultural group for social, cultural or spiritual reasons.

St John's Church, Mundoolun has a special association with the Collins family, early settlers of the Beaudesert area who became eminent and influential pastoralists with properties and business interests throughout Queensland and the Northern Territory. Robert Martin Collins is important for the pivotal role he played in campaigning for the establishment of a national park in the McPherson Range and for launching the movement for national parks in Queensland in the 1890s. The cemetery contains the graves of many members of the Collins family and Bullum, also known as John Allen, the last survivor of the Wangerriburra tribe, who had a lifelong association with the family.

The place has a special association with the life or work of a particular person, group or organisation of importance in Queensland's history.

The church also has an association with ecclesiastical architect, John Buckeridge.
