= Veresdale, Queensland =

Veresdale
- Suburb
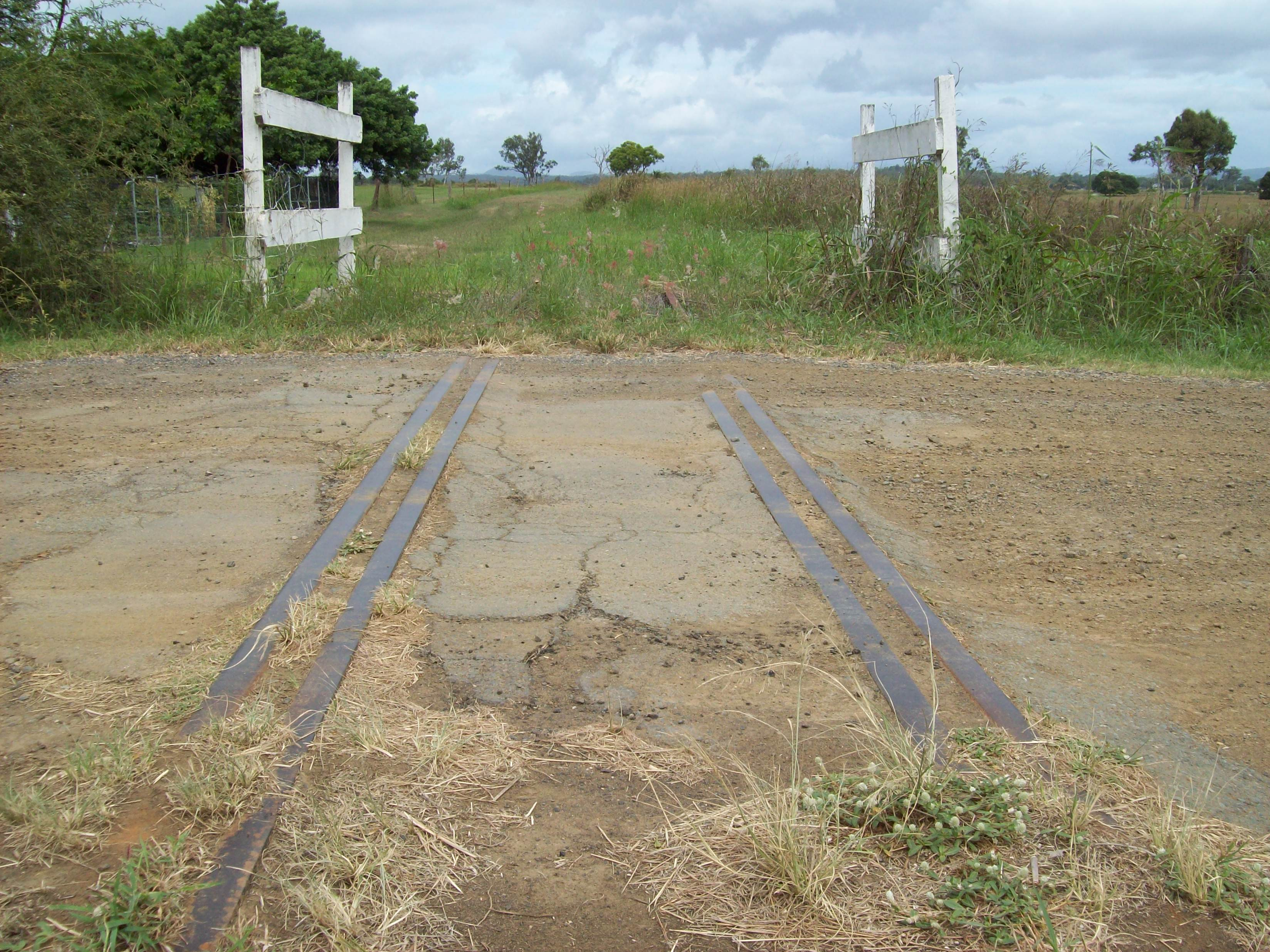
- Former Beaudesert railway line, 2009

- Interactive map of Veresdale
- Coordinates: 27.9089°S 152.978°E
- Country: Australia
- State: Queensland
- LGAs: Logan City; Scenic Rim
- Location: 9.2 km (5.7 mi) N of Beaudesert; 41.0 km (25.5 mi) SSW of Logan Central; 60.0 km (37.3 mi) S of Brisbane CBD

Government
  - State electorate: Scenic Rim
  - Federal division: Wright

Area
  - Total: 16.3 km^{2} (6.3 sq mi)

Population
  - Total: 414 (2021 census)
  - Density: 25.40/km^{2} (65.78/sq mi)
- Time zone: UTC+10:00 (AEST)
- Postcode: 4285
Suburbs around Veresdale
Allenview	Woodhill	Veresdale Scrub
Allenview	Veresdale	Veresdale Scrub
Gleneagle	Beaudesert	Birnam

Veresdale is a rural locality split between the City of Logan and the Scenic Rim Region, Queensland, Australia. In the 2021 census, Veresdale had a population of 414 people.

== Geography ==
The Logan River forms part of the north-western boundary.

Mount Lindesay Highway enters the locality from the north (Woodhill) and exits to the south-west (Gleneagle).

The land use is predominantly grazing on both irrigated pastures (in areas near the Logan River) and native vegetation. There is a small amount of crop growing and rural residential housing.

== History ==
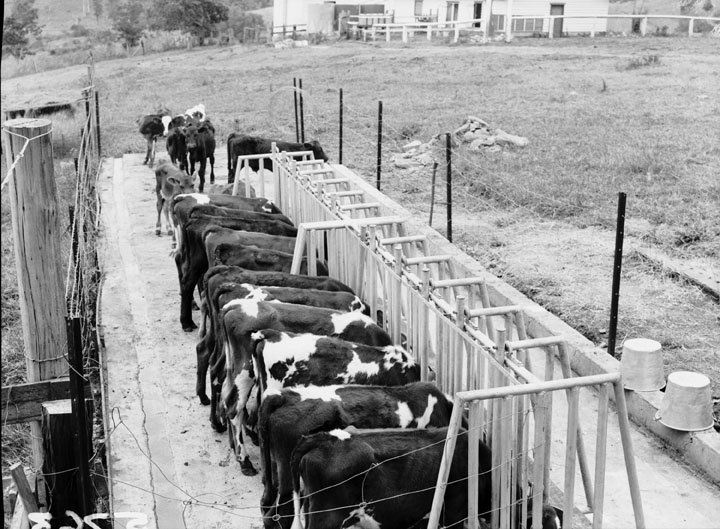
Cattle drinking troughs, Veresdale, 1955

Robert Towns established a cotton plantation called Townsvale in the area now known as Veresdale and Gleneagle. In 1863, he imported 73 Melanesians (locally known as Kanakas) to work on the plantation.

Townsvale National School opened on 2 June 1873. On 1 January 1874, it was renamed Veresdale State School. In 1899, it was renamed Woodhill State School and is within the present-day locality of Woodhill to the north of present-day Veresdale.

St Joseph's Catholic Church was the first Catholic church in the Logan River district and was opened in 1876 on a 4-acre (1.6 ha) site (27.9464°S 152.9857°E), then known as Tullamore Hill, later as Veresdale, and now within Gleneagle. The site for the church was donated by William Rafter, whose residence was called Tullamore after his home town Tullamore in Ireland. Tullamore was the major centre of the district (prior to the rise of Beaudesert as the major centre). A cemetery was established behind the church. On 2 June 1889 Roman Catholic Archbishop Robert Dunne blessed the Catholic cemetery (now known as the Gleneagle Catholic Cemetery). In 1936 the church was lined and ceiled for the first time. By the early 1950s the smal church was in poor repair and it had a very small congregation (St Mary's Catholic Church in Beaudesert was very large and by then the major town of the district). At that time, Mass was being held regularly at the O'Reilly Guesthouse in Goblin Wood, the private home of Bernard O'Reilly. So it was decided to relocate St Joseph's to the O'Reilly Guesthouse as a permanent church. It was dismantled, transported and re-assembled. On 27 November 1955, Father Steele presided over the first Mass in the relocated church and Archbishop James Duhig performed the opening ceremony. Although privately owned by the O'Reilly family, it is still strongly associated with the Beaudesert Catholic parish. The cemetery in Gleneagle still operates. In 1983 the Catholic cemetery at Waterford West was sold by the Catholic Church for re-development; graves marked with headstones were exhumed and relocated to Gleneagle Catholic Cemetery.

Veresdale railway station (27.9086°S 152.9781°E) was on the disused Beaudesert railway line from Bethania to Beaudesert. The line opened on 16 May 1888.

Christ Church Anglican was dedicated on 29 May 1906 by Henry Le Fanu, Archdeacon of Brisbane. Its closure on 3 May 2003 was approved by Assistant Bishop Ron Williams.

Formerly in the Shire of Beaudesert, Veresdale was split between Logan City and Scenic Rim Region following the local government amalgamations in March 2008.

== Demographics ==
In the 2016 census, Veresdale had a population of 392 people.

In the 2021 census, Veresdale had a population of 414 people.

== Education ==
There are no schools in Veresdale. The nearest government primary schools are Woodhill State School in neighbouring Woodhill to the north, Gleneagle State School in neighbouring Gleneagle to the south-west, and Veresdale Scrub State School in Veresdale Scrub to the east. The nearest government secondary school is Beaudesert State High School in neighbouring Beaudesert to the south.

== Amenities ==
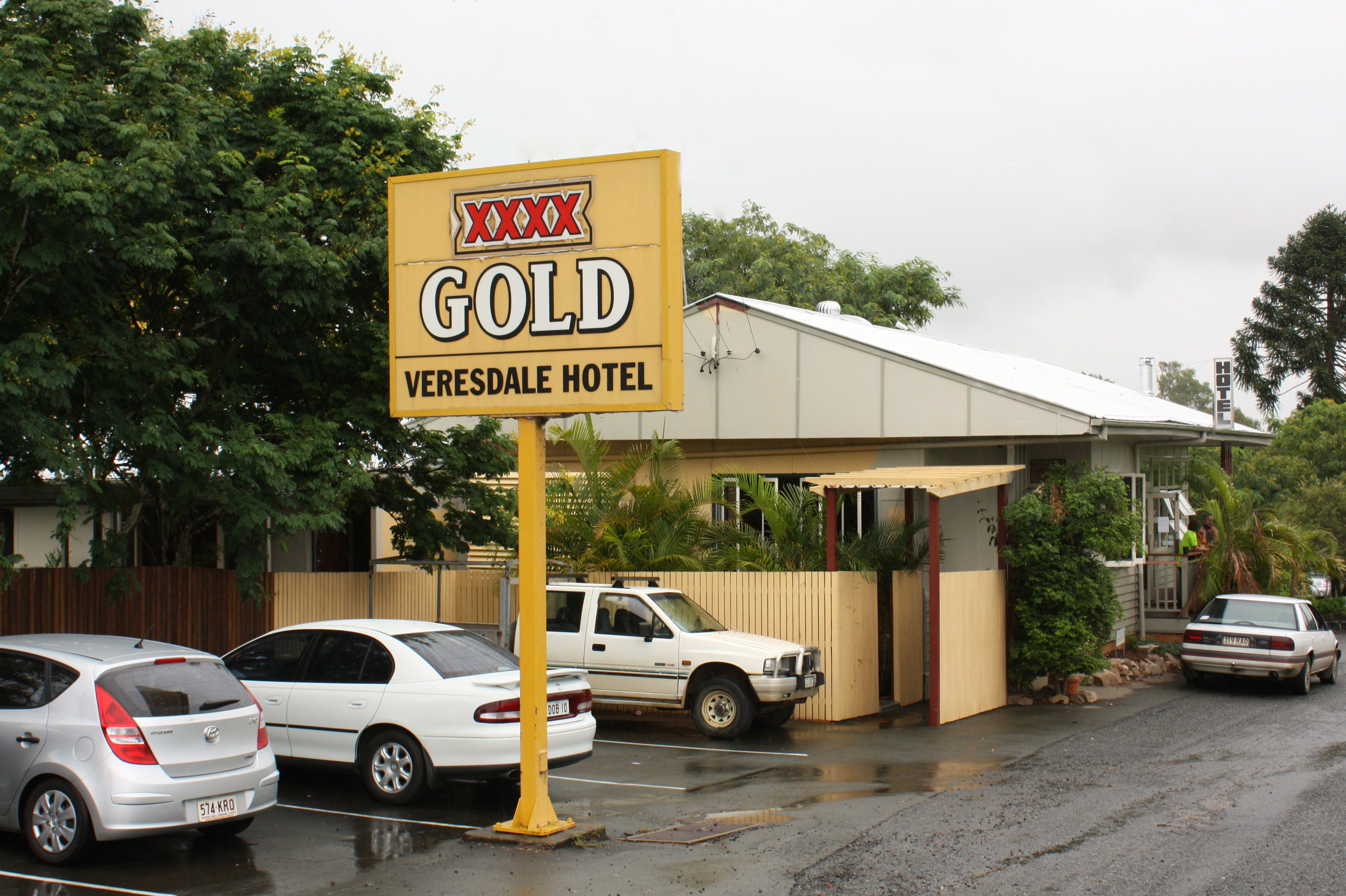
Veresdale Hotel, 2011

The Veresdale Hotel is at 6202 Mount Lindesay Highway (27.9080°S 152.9785°E).
