= Blair's Harbour =

Non-physical location on 19th-century maps

Coordinates: 2.66991877°N 103.76156472°E

Blair's Harbour is located between Pahang on the east coast of Peninsular Malaysia and the island of Tioman. It never seems to have had any associated settlement or infrastructure, but appears (sometimes without the apostrophe or the 's') on many maps of the Malayan Peninsula or surrounding regions during the 19th century, and still appears on Admiralty Charts.

Alexander Dalrymple of the Hydrography Department of the British Admiralty published a plan of this location on 9 February 1793. The surveyor was Lieutenant Archibald Blair of the East India Company's Bombay Marine.

On the plan Blair's Harbour is described as:

Bearing 11 1/4 S of the South End of Po. Teoman 10 leagues Lat.2°43‘N
It is very secure being skreened from both Monsoons, and is
easy of access the bottom a stiff clay. The water is good
and may be had in abundance by making Wells 5 feet deep 20
or 30 yards from high water mark.

A later description of Blair (sic) Harbour is just "The channel between Tanj.Peniabong and Keban I., N.Johore".
