= HMCS Atholl =

Modified Flower-class corvette

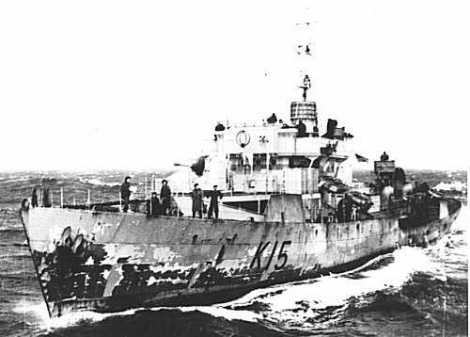
- HMCS Atholl

History

Canada
- Name: HMCS Atholl
- Namesake: Campbellton, New Brunswick
- Ordered: 2 January 1942
- Builder: Morton Engineering & Dry Dock Co., Quebec City
- Laid down: 15 August 1942
- Launched: 4 April 1943
- Commissioned: 14 October 1943
- Decommissioned: 17 July 1945
- Identification: Pennant number: K15
- Honours and awards: Atlantic 1944-45
- Fate: Sold for scrapping October 1952

General characteristics
- Class & type: Flower-class corvette (modified)
- Displacement: 1,015 long tons (1,031 t; 1,137 short tons)
- Length: 208 ft (63.40 m)o/a
- Beam: 33 ft (10.06 m)
- Draught: 11 ft (3.35 m)
- Propulsion: single shaft; 2 × oil fired water tube boilers; 1 triple-expansion reciprocating steam engine; 2,750 ihp (2,050 kW)
- Speed: 16 knots (29.6 km/h)
- Range: 7,400 nautical miles (13,705 km) at 10 knots (18.5 km/h)
- Complement: 90
- Sensors & processing systems: 1 Type 271 SW2C radar; 1 Type 144 sonar
- Armament: 1 × 4 in (102 mm) QF Mk XIX naval gun; 1 × 2-pounder Mk.VIII single "pom-pom"; 2 × 20 mm Oerlikon single; 1 × Hedgehog A/S mortar; 4 × Mk.II depth charge throwers; 2 × depth charge rails with 70 depth charges

HMCS Atholl was a modified Flower-class corvette that served with the Royal Canadian Navy during the Second World War. She fought primarily in the Battle of the Atlantic as a convoy escort. She was named for Campbellton, New Brunswick; however, as there was a Royal Navy ship with the same name, her name was chosen to commemorate the town instead of being named for it directly.

== Background ==
The "corvette" designation was created by the French as a class of small sailing warships; the Royal Navy borrowed the term for a period but discontinued its use in 1877. During the hurried preparations for war in the late 1930s Winston Churchill reactivated the corvette class, needing a name for smaller ships used in an escort capacity; the Flowers were based on a whaling ship design. The generic name "flower" was used to designate the class of these ships, which – in the Royal Navy – were named after flowers.

Flower-class corvettes like Atholl served with the Royal Canadian Navy during the Second World War. They were named after communities for the most part, to better represent the people who took part in building them. This idea was put forth by Admiral Percy W. Nelles. Sponsors were commonly associated with the community for which the ship was named. Royal Navy corvettes were designed as open sea escorts, while Canadian corvettes were developed for coastal auxiliary roles and were fitted, for example, with minesweeping gear. Eventually the Canadian corvettes were modified to allow them to perform better on the open seas.

== Construction ==
Atholl was ordered 2 January 1942 as part of the 1942-43 modified Flower-class building programme. This programme was known as the Increased Endurance (IE). Many changes were made, all from lessons that had been learned in previous versions of the Flower-class. The bridge was made a full deck higher and built to naval standards instead of the more civilian-like bridges of previous versions. The platform for the 4-inch main gun was raised to minimize the amount of spray over it and to provide a better field of fire. It was also connected to the wheelhouse by a wide platform that was now the base for the Hedgehog anti-submarine mortar that this version was armed with. Along with the new Hedgehog, this version got the new QF 4-inch Mk XIX main gun, which was semi-automatic, used fixed ammunition and had the ability to elevate higher giving it an anti-aircraft ability.

Other superficial changes to this version include an upright funnel and pressurized boiler rooms which eliminated the need for hooded ventilators around the base of the funnel. This changes the silhouette of the corvette and made it more difficult for submariners to tell which way the corvette was laying.

She was laid down by Morton Engineering & Dry Dock Co. at Quebec City, Quebec and was launched 4 April 1943. She was commissioned into the Royal Canadian Navy 14 October 1943 at Quebec City. During her service Atholl had one refit. This began at Sydney, Nova Scotia in December 1944 and was completed in April 1945 at Halifax.

== Service history ==
After arriving at Halifax Atholl was sent to Pictou for workups. She developed mechanical problems and had to return to Halifax for repairs. In February 1944, she was assigned the Royal Navy's escort group EG 9 working out of Derry. She sailed for the United Kingdom with convoy HX 281 in March. When she arrived the corvettes of her group were exchanged for newer frigates, and Atholl returned to Canada in April.

Later in April 1944, Atholl was assigned to the Mid-Ocean Escort Force based at St. John's. She joined escort group C-4 upon arrival, and served the rest of the war with them.

Atholl was paid off at Sydney on 17 July 1945. She was transferred to the War Assets Corporation and laid up at Sorel, Quebec. She was sold for scrap and broken up at Hamilton, Ontario by the Steel Co. of Canada in October 1952.
