= Athol (Edenton, North Carolina) =

Historic house in North Carolina, United States

- U.S. National Register of Historic Places
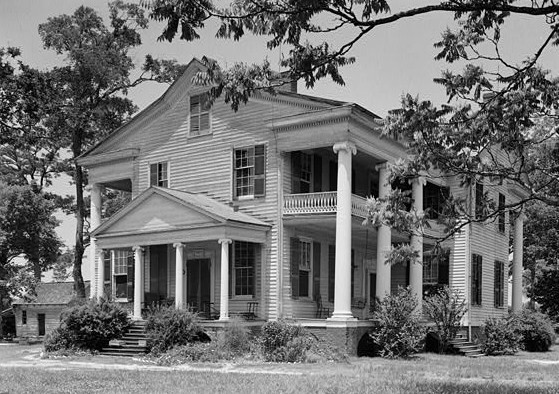
- Athol, HABS Photo, June 1940

- Location within North Carolina Location within the United States
- Location: SE of Edenton on SR 1114, near Edenton, North Carolina
- Coordinates: 36°0′43″N 76°33′38″W
- Area: 8 acres (3.2 ha)
- Built: c. 1845
- Architectural style: Greek Revival
- NRHP reference No.: 80002808
- Added to NRHP: May 22, 1980

Athol, also known as Benbury Hall and Joshua Skinner House, is a historic plantation house located near Edenton, Chowan County, North Carolina. It was built about 1857, and is a 2 1/2-story, five-bay, T-shaped Greek Revival style frame dwelling. The rear section of the house features two-tier porches on either side. The front facade features a full-length two-tiered porch supported by Roman Ionic order columns.

It was listed on the National Register of Historic Places in 1980.
