= ATOLL (programming language) =

Programming language

Acceptance, Test Or Launch Language (ATOLL) was the programming language used for automating the checking and launch of Saturn rockets.
