= Athol Shephard =

Australian cricketer

Personal information
- Born: 16 August 1920; Burnie, Tasmania, Australia
- Died: 2 February 2006 (aged 85); Burnie, Tasmania, Australia

Domestic team information
- Years: Team
- 1948-1960: Tasmania
- Source: Cricinfo, 8 March 2016

Athol Shephard (16 August 1920 – 2 February 2006) was an Australian cricketer. He played seven first-class matches for Tasmania between 1948 and 1960. He also played for, and was captain of, Yeoman and Burnie. He also played football and golf, and won the Seabrook Championship three times in three years from 1952 to 1954.

== See also ==
- List of Tasmanian representative cricketers
