= Justice Blair (disambiguation) =

Justice Blair refers to John Blair Jr. (1732–1800), associate justice of the Supreme Court of the United States. Justice Blair may also refer to:

- Charles A. Blair (1854–1912), associate justice of the Michigan Supreme Court
- David Elmore Blair (1874–1954), associate justice of the Supreme Court of Missouri
