= Blair toilet =

Type of pit toilet with vent pipe

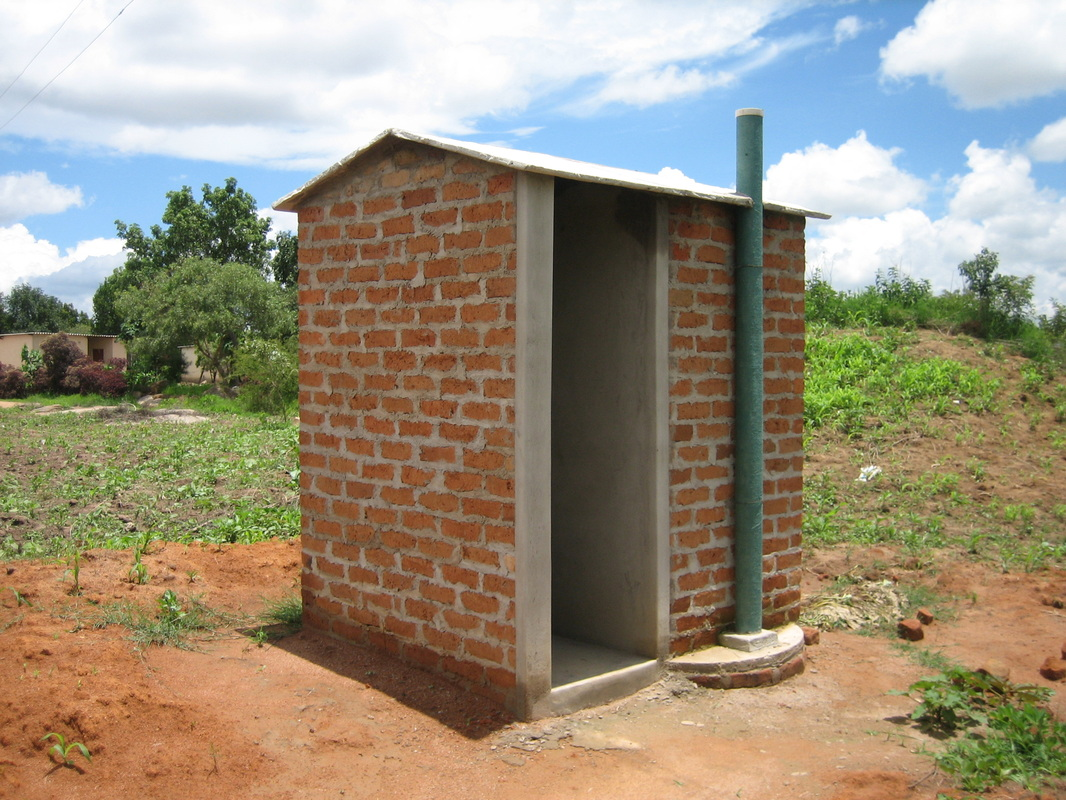
A Blair toilet with an exhaust pipe

The Blair Toilet (a.k.a. Blair Latrine) is a pit toilet designed in the 1970s. It was a result of large-scale projects to improve rural sanitation in Rhodesia under UDI at the Blair Research Institute, and then deployed further during the 1980s after Zimbabwean Independence. There was mass deployment of the toilet design in the rural areas of the country. It was developed by Peter Morgan of Salisbury, Rhodesia (now Harare, Zimbabwe).

Its design makes use of air currents, a septic tank like pit, over which is built an upper structure with an open light-trap entrance and ventilation pipe from the bottom pit with a fine wire grate to keep out flies but more importantly to trap those entering the toilet hole from flying out towards the light. The result is hygienic, as flies can not escape from the fecal matter to spread disease, and the gases produced by the decomposing waste are redirected outside. It also does not smell.
