= Athol Milne =

Australian rules footballer

Personal information
- Full name: Athelstane Milne
- Born: 10 December 1889; Hawthorn, Victoria
- Died: 19 September 1946 (aged 56); Caulfield, Victoria
- Original team: Dookie College

Playing career^{1}
| Years | Club | Games (Goals) |
| 1912–1913 | University | 10 (2) |
- ^{1} Playing statistics correct to the end of 1913.

Athelstane "Athol" Milne (10 December 1889 – 19 September 1946) was an Australian rules footballer who played for the University Football Club in the Victorian Football League (VFL).

He later served in World War I.
