= Birnam, Queensland (Scenic Rim Region) =

Birnam
- Suburb
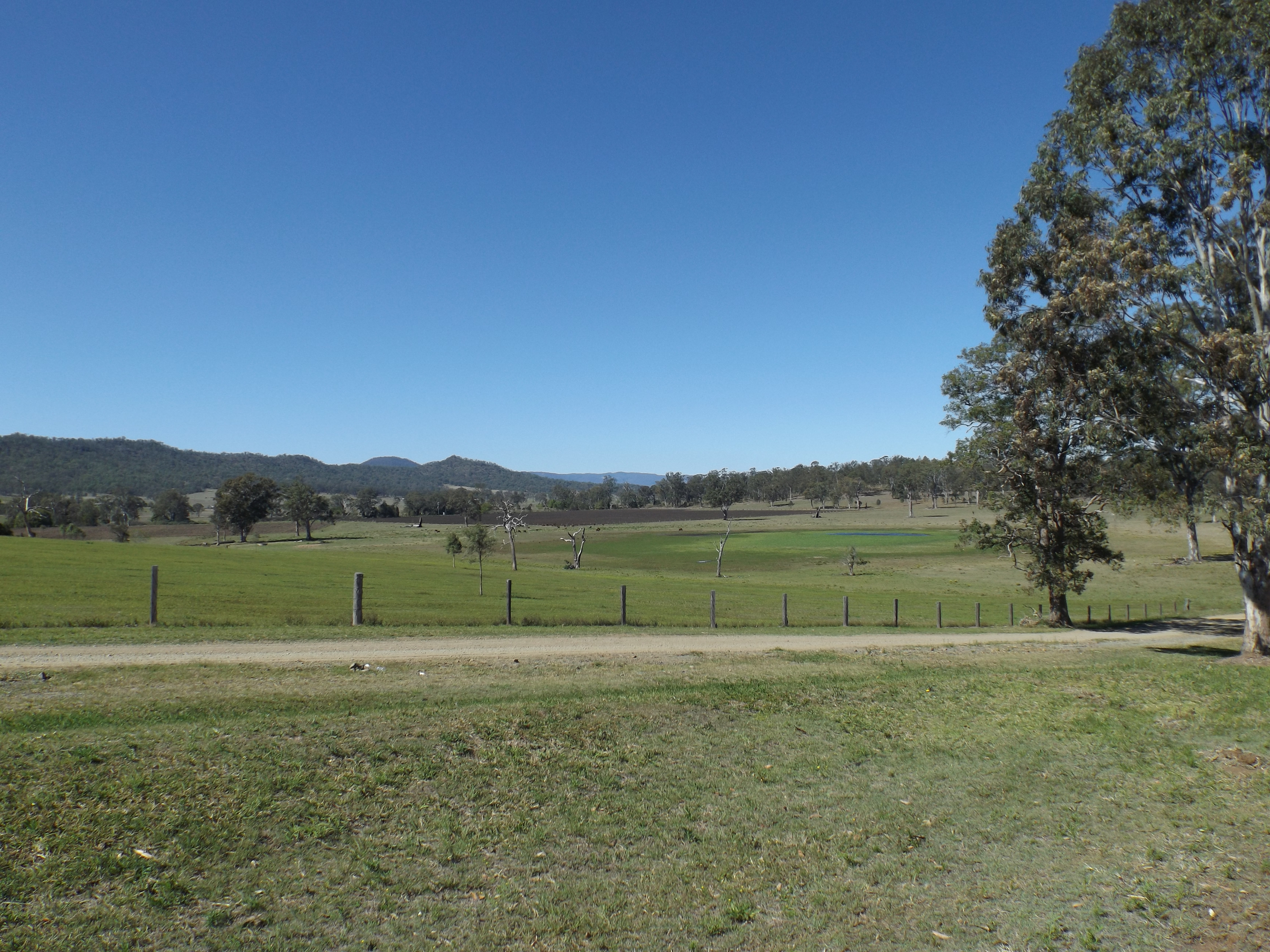
- Paddocks along Beaudesert Beenleigh Road, 2014

- Interactive map of Birnam
- Coordinates: 27.9486°S 153.0616°E
- Country: Australia
- State: Queensland
- City: Logan City
- LGA: Scenic Rim Region
- Location: 10.4 km (6.5 mi) NE of Beaudesert; 64.7 km (40.2 mi) S of Brisbane CBD

Government
  - State electorate: Scenic Rim
  - Federal division: Wright

Area
  - Total: 20.9 km^{2} (8.1 sq mi)

Population
  - Total: 109 (2021 census)
  - Density: 5.22/km^{2} (13.51/sq mi)
- Time zone: UTC+10:00 (AEST)
- Postcode: 4285
Suburbs around Birnam
Veresdale Scrub; Veresdale	Mundoolun	Boyland
Veresdale	Birnam	Tabragalba
Beaudesert	Tabragalba	Tabragalba

Birnam is a rural locality in the Scenic Rim Region, Queensland, Australia. In the 2021 census, Birnam had a population of 109 people.

== Geography ==
The eastern border of Birnam is marked by the Albert River. The locality is relatively undeveloped, with a few farms in the east. In the north west the slopes of Mount Dunsinane rise to around 300 metres (980 ft).

The Beaudesert–Beenleigh Road runs through from south to north-east.

== History ==
Birnam State School opened on 17 October 1929 and closed in 1937.

== Demographics ==
In the 2016 census, Birnam had a population of 106 people. The locality contained 44 households, in which 51.9% of the population were males and 48.1% of the population were females with a median age of 45, 7 years above the national average. The average weekly household income was $1,889, $461 above the national average.

In the 2021 census, Birnam had a population of 109 people.

== Education ==
There are no schools in Birnam. The nearest government primary schools are Beaudesert State School in neighbouring Beaudesert to the south-west and Veresdale Scrub State School in neighbouring Veresdale Scrub to the north-west. The nearest government secondary school is Beaudesert State High School in Beaudesert.
