= Birnam, Gauteng =

Birnam
- Location within Gauteng Location within South Africa
- Coordinates: 26°7′58″S 28°4′0″E
- Country: South Africa
- Province: Gauteng
- Municipality: City of Johannesburg
- Main Place: Johannesburg
- Established: 1905

Area
  - Total: 0.82 km^{2} (0.32 sq mi)

Population (2011)
  - Total: 1,624
  - Density: 2,000/km^{2} (5,100/sq mi)

Racial makeup (2011)
  - Black African: 35.7%
  - Coloured: 3.0%
  - Indian/Asian: 7.1%
  - White: 53.0%
  - Other: 1.2%

First languages (2011)
  - English: 64.8%
  - Zulu: 6.9%
  - Afrikaans: 6.8%
  - Southern Ndebele: 3.3%
  - Other: 18.1%
- Time zone: UTC+2 (SAST)
- Postal code (street): 2196

Birnam is a suburb of Johannesburg, South Africa. It is located in Region E of the City of Johannesburg Metropolitan Municipality.

== History ==
The suburb has its origin in 1905, of 14ha and 105 stands. Like most suburbs in the area, it is of Scottish origin, named for Birnam Woods.
