= Atholl, Gauteng =

Atholl
- Location within Gauteng Location within South Africa
- Coordinates: 26°6′59″S 28°4′1″E
- Country: South Africa
- Province: Gauteng
- Municipality: City of Johannesburg
- Main Place: Sandton

Area
  - Total: 2.24 km^{2} (0.86 sq mi)

Population (2011)
  - Total: 4,153
  - Density: 1,850/km^{2} (4,800/sq mi)

Racial makeup (2011)
  - Black African: 35.7%
  - Coloured: 1.5%
  - Indian/Asian: 6.7%
  - White: 54.3%
  - Other: 1.8%

First languages (2011)
  - English: 67.1%
  - Zulu: 5.8%
  - Afrikaans: 5.0%
  - Northern Sotho: 4.1%
  - Other: 18.1%
- Time zone: UTC+2 (SAST)
- Postal code (street): 2196

Atholl is a suburb of Johannesburg, South Africa. It is located in Region E. Atholl was the name of a former district in the Scottish Highlands, which is now part of the Perth and Kinross council area.
