= Blair, Jefferson County, West Virginia =

Unincorporated community in West Virginia, United States

- Unincorporated community
- Location within West Virginia Location within the United States
- Coordinates: 39°17′42″N 77°47′45″W
- Country: United States
- State: West Virginia
- County: Jefferson
- Time zone: UTC-5 (Eastern (EST))
  - Summer (DST): UTC-4 (EDT)
- GNIS feature ID: 1553920

Blair is an unincorporated community on the Shenandoah River in Jefferson County, West Virginia, United States. Blair lies along County Route 23.
