= Patrick Hockey =

Australian artist (1948–1992)

Patrick William Hockey
- Born: 19 October 1948; Abercorn, Queensland
- Died: 30 June 1992 (aged 43); London, England
- Resting place: Mundoolun, Logan City, Queensland
- Education: Brisbane Church of England Grammar
- Known for: Painting: landscape, still life, murals
- Style: Lyrical realism
- Spouse: Margaret De Burgh Hockey
- Parents: Max Hockey (father); Helen Irene Beatrice "Nell" Hockey (née Hamilton) (mother)

Patrick William Hockey (1948–1992) was an Australian grazier, writer, and painter of landscapes and urban environments.

== Early life ==
Patrick Hockey was born on 19 October 1948, in Abercorn, Queensland to Nell and Max Hockey, and was brother to David and Heather. His upbringing on his family's 26,000 hectare cattle station 'Abercorn' was to influence the subject matter and style of his future painting. He was educated at Abercorn Primary School and Brisbane Church of England Grammar. Attending a summer school at the University of New England taught by Stan Rapotec aroused his interest in painting.

Hockey's art first came to attention for his entry in the 1972 $7,500 Travelodge Art Prize in Canberra, when Guy Grey-Smith, reviewing the show in The Canberra Times described how "the warmth of country faces the obscenity of the city [in] the red brown earth of Patrick Hockey". To Shiela Scotter, Hockey described himself as being "from no particular school - I've just always wanted to paint," and took pride in being self-taught.

== Exhibiting artist and socialite ==
Granted two years off after jackarooing at the cattle station for seven years, and with a round-the-world ticket given him by his father with his blessing, Hockey traveled to London at age twenty-four. There, his flamboyant paintings and murals in house-paints, acrylics and watercolour came to prominence after Redfern Gallery exhibited it in 1975 at the Royal Court Theatre of Queensland House in Sloane Square, London, and from April that year he was then represented by Holdsworth galleries in Sydney, then later by Lister and Greenhill galleries in Perth, and Philip Bacon gallery in Brisbane.

In 1979 he met art collector Evelyn Lambert in Venice, and spent time with Viscountess Rothermere in Monte Carlo, returning in 1980 to enjoy the Sydney social scene. In March 1982 his name appeared on the National Trust's full-page advertisement in The Sydney Morning Herald signed by 93 high-profile citizens protesting the demolition of the Rural Bank Building, Martin Place. Also in the 1980s June McCallum, editor-in-chief of Vogue Australia, commissioned Hockey to write up his world travels.

In 1985 he joined Karen Knight-Mudie, John Rigby, Robert Jacks, Victor Majzner, Sally Robinson, George Chaloupka, Wendy Flynn, Allan Howard, with organiser Frank Hodgkinson in the art camp in Arnhem Land under the Northern Territory Museum of Arts and Sciences 'Artists in the Field' program.

Carolyn Soutar in her biography of Dave Allen describes a meal at The Golden Century in Sydney "which ended up with Patrick Hockey and Dave taking all the clutter off the table and turning the tablecloth into this huge piece of art. Everyone piled in and drew on it as well. Between the soy-sauce stains and the wonderful artwork by Patrick and Dave it was really stunning. Dave finished the evening by walking out of the restaurant wrapped in this tablecloth, wearing it like a toga." Amongst other venues, Hockey's paintings decorated Kable's restaurant in the Regent Hotel in Sydney, commissioned by its manager Ted Wright.

By 1988 he counted amongst his clients Alan Bond, Susan Renouf, and Kerry Packer. On his own account Hockey said he enjoyed the social life, "though I don't go out half as much as people think and for half the year [at Beaudesert] I'm off the drink and I work seven days a week." Asked if "reverse snobbery" had impeded his career he conceded that it had in artistic circles, but not monetarily, and that "in the bush" his success was admired.

Hockey's later focus was on interiors, still lifes with sea shells and, inspired by a commission from Susan Renouf, floral works. He was art director for the film The Last Tango with Rudolph Valentino set in Sydney in 1975, about a woman so obsessed with Valentino that she kept a shrine to him in her house.

== Reception ==
Terry Ingram, noting in Art & Australia the doldrums in the art market of early 1990 remarked that, nevertheless:

[...] isolated rashes of red stickers went up around Sydney and Melbourne galleries, mostly because the dealers had the good sense to show recession-proof work — pretty, escapist pictures or works by artists who have a special following, or both: Patrick Hockey, at Holdsworth Galleries and Frances Jones, who paints bowls of fruit, at Eddie Glastra's.

Columnist Sally Loane remarked in 1992 that "to his detractors in the gossipy art and social world, Patrick Hockey was a dilettante, his art dismissed as decorative. The serious art circles scoffed at his constant appearances in the social pages and the fact that his art was almost always linked with the rich and famous." To interviewer Geraldine O'Brien he remarked that he knew:

...artists who say they only sell to the public collections — which, of course, is where posterity lies. But I'm not part of the power clique of the art world, of the curators and critics, though I think I am in a way as serious as someone more obviously 'serious'. I just paint what I fancy, what I feel like painting. I'm not sure that 'seriousness' is necessary for an artist, anyway. I've not the time to do all that suffering.

Comparing Hockey and John Nixon's 1988 exhibitions at Holdsworth Galleries and Roslyn Oxley's respectively, Sydney Morning Herald critic John McDonald defended Hockey against a perceived lack of 'seriousness':

It's quite easy to sympathise Hockey's ideas about 'seriousness'. Since he works hard at his painting, since many people buy his works and obviously get pleasure from them, who is to say that Hockey is any less serious an artist than Nixon? Is a work automatically more serious if it looks cheap instead of expensive, if it pays lip-service to modernist heroes like Malevich and is accompanied by a catalogue statement chiefly distinguished by its contempt for syntax? The difference is obviously one of milieu, yet in his hedonism and his taste for decorative painting, Hockey is being undeniably true to himself. He doesn't pretend to be changing the world and would probably find Nixon's brand of pseudo-spiritual asceticism quite repugnant. Where Hockey wants to please the viewer, Nixon sets out to chasten him or her.

McDonald's review, as Tim Bonyhady notes, brought protests, ignored by The Herald, from Tony Bond, the curator of contemporary art at the Art Gallery of New South Wales, and Paul Foss and Paul Taylor of Art and Text. Artist Mike Parr published a rejoinder in Agenda in August, finding that Hockey was 'strictly incommensurable' against the superior Nixon, and a rumour spread that a dead cockroach had been mailed to McDonald, who accused Nixon.

== Personal life ==
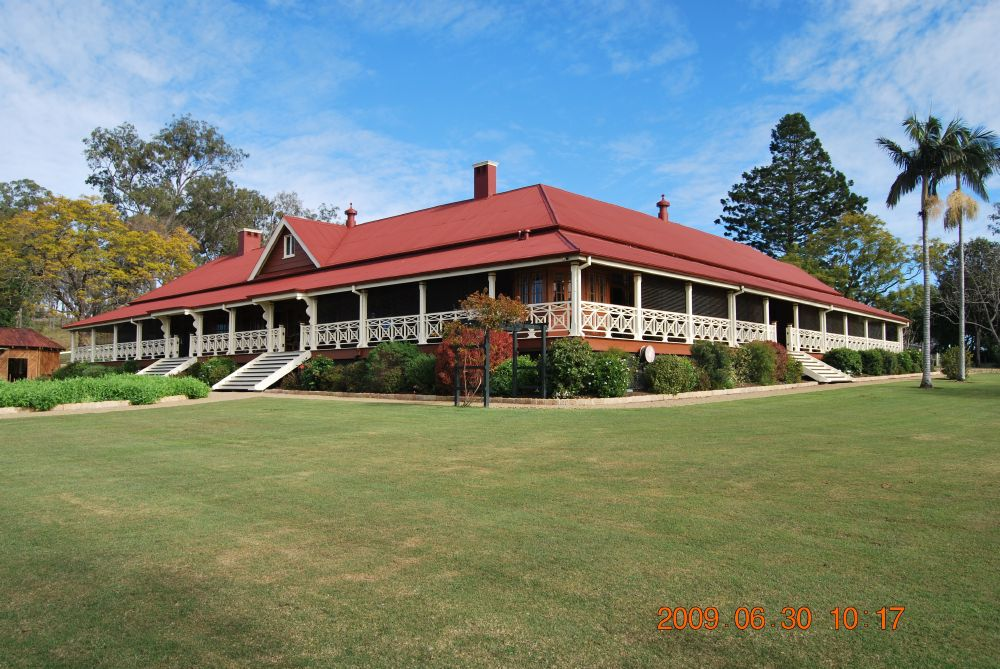
Nindooinbah Homestead (2009)

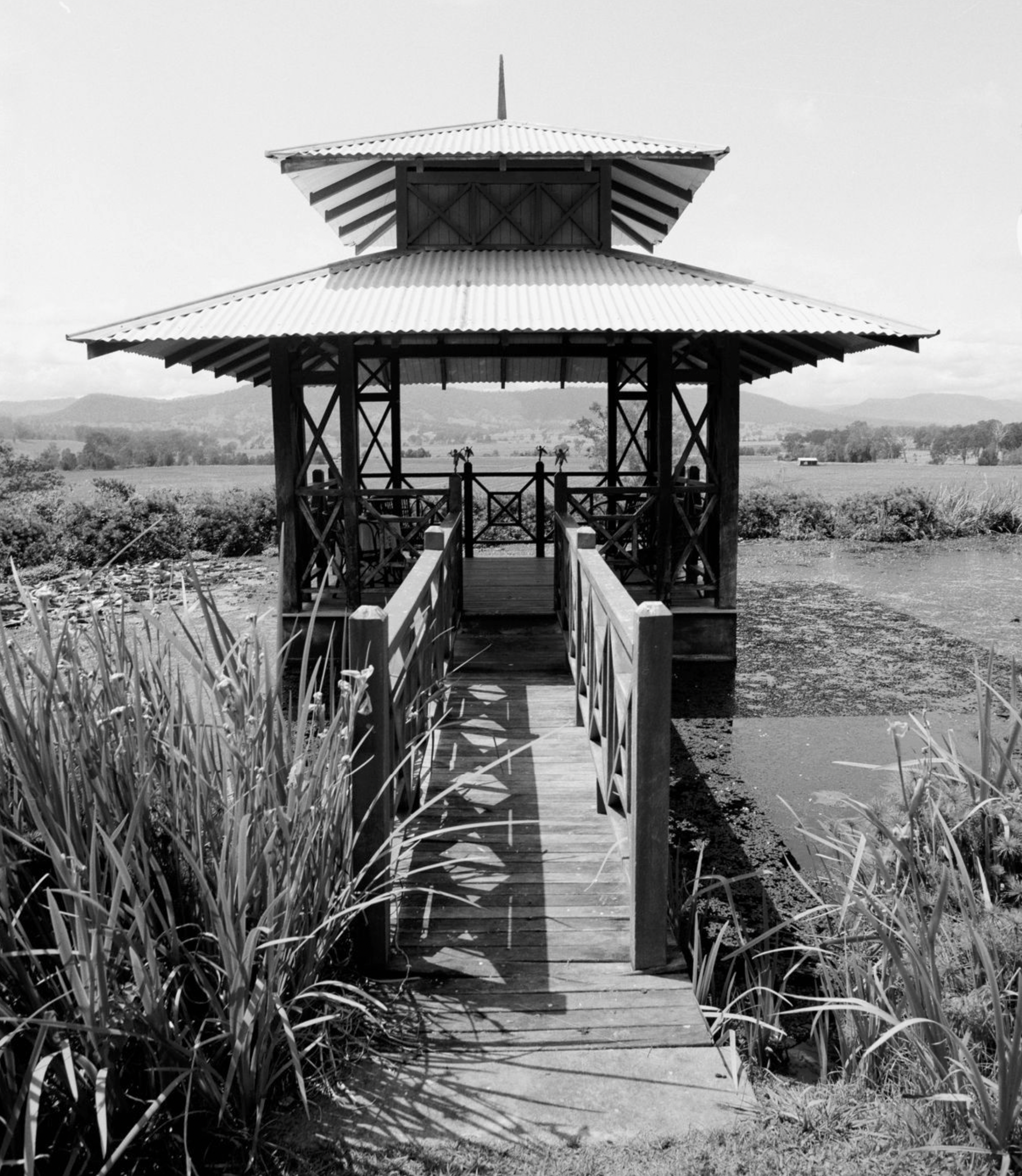
Reina Irmer (n.d.). Walkway leading to the teahouse on the lake at Nindooinbah homestead, Beaudesert district, Queensland.

On 10 March 1983 Hockey married (Beryl) Margaret (de Burgh Persse) in front of guests Tim Storrier, Donald Friend, model Penelope Tree, Sir lan and Lady Potter, Leo Schofield, Caroline and John Laws, actress Carmen Duncan, Harry M. Miller, jeweller Tony White and former Brisbane Lord Mayor Sallyanne Atkinson. Artist Donald Friend described how for the wedding ceremony:

We drove to Beaudesert and out a few miles to the St Johns Church, Mundoolun. The occasion was one that had been much gossiped about for months—the marriage of Patrick Hockey (a rich very gay society man—a sort of butterfly in a Rolls Royce: a terribly fashionable painter; an amiable sort of nonsense person) to Margaret de Burgh Persse, heiress to a vast fortune and one of the great pioneer cattle stations. It was a most elaborate affair. Three hundred guests had been invited to the ceremony and to the reception afterwards at a marvellous old-style homestead [Nindooinbah] kept up still as it would have been fifty years ago, set in a grand garden embowered in azaleas.

They settled in and restored her ancestral home Nindooinbah House in Beaudesert. The couple spent periods apart, and his bisexuality was neither kept secret nor broadcast. Margaret remembered how he loved women; "he was very much a man for all seasons. Whatever company he was in, he enjoyed...It was a great privilege to be married to him" In the grounds he created his studio in a vernacular Australian style and designed a tea house inspired by the Willow Pattern, and in the homestead Hockey displayed his work. Never relinquishing his inherited occupation as a grazier, he fattened the cattle from his own Queensland estate on the property, commuting from his mural-decorated former boarding house in an 1859 Surry Hills terrace, purchased in 1976, to do so.

=== Death ===
Having discovered that he was infected with HIV and while taking a month-long trip with his sister Heather Stevens in England, which he had planned months ahead to see old friends, Hockey died in London aged forty-three, on 30 June 1992, of an AIDS-related illness.

His wife Margaret remembered "He wanted to go with flags flying. He resented the idea of dying terribly. He didn't want to accept it. He loved life so much, he just wanted to go on living."

His funeral service was held on 4 July at Christ Church St Laurence, George Street. His estate was sold by Goodmans Auctions on 25 October 1993.

=== Legacy ===
A posthumous survey of Hockey's work was written by friend and prominent art critic Sandra McGrath in 1994, describing his "love of life" as "reflected in his paintings that straddled several contrasting worlds: the world of art and the world of commerce; the country and the city; the heterosexual and the homosexual; world of society and the world of the stockman; the loner and the bon vivant." Margaret Hockey in 2000 was awarded a Medal of the Order of Australia for "service to the community, particularly through charitable organisations, the promotion of arts and crafts and the preservation of the local history of Beaudesert."

== Awards ==
- 1974: Royal Agricultural Society of New South Wales Easter Show Art Prize, shared with Nance Lemerle

== Selected exhibitions ==
- 1976, 6–24 April: Patrick Hockey and Louis Kahan, Holdsworth Galleries, Woollahra
- 1977, 26 July–13 August: George Hatsatouris, Patrick Hockey, Holdsworth Galleries
- 1977, 2–20 December: Patrick Hockey. Philip Bacon Galleries, 2 Arthur Street, New Farm
- 1978, March–April: Patrick Hockey; Lilian Weinberg. Holdsworth Galleries
- 1979, 10–22 November: Christopher Boock; Patrick Hockey; Randwick Technical College jewellery. Holdsworth Galleries
- 1980, Redfern Galleries, London
- 1980, 24 November - 1 1 December: Patrick Hockey; Helen Finch. Holdsworth Galleries
- 1987, 5–22 January: Patrick Hockey, Paintings. Greenhill Galleries, Perth
- 1988, February: solo show, Holdsworth Galleries
- 1990, 3–21 February: solo show, Holdsworth Galleries

=== Posthumous ===
- 1995 30 November–22 December: Patrick Hockey: Kakadu. North Shore Galleries, Neutral Bay
- 1996, October: group exhibition with Arthur Boyd, Charles Blackman, Donald Friend, Robert Dickerson, Ray Crooke and others. Holdsworth Galleries
- 2000, 30 March: Autumn group exhibition with Claudius Jacquand, Theodore Jacques Ralli, Robert Grieve, Anne Montgomery, Bill Coleman, Brian Westwood, Nicholas Nedelkopoulos, Lenton Parr, Paul Jacoulet, Sidney Nolan, Elwyn Lynn, Ronnie Tjampitjinpa, George Baldessin, Fernando Zobel De Ayala, Godfrey Miller, George Tjungarrayi, James Gleeson, Arnold Shore, Arthur Murch, Norman Lindsay, Norman Lloyd, Ethel Carrick Fox, William Beckwith McInnes, Hans Heysen, George Bell, Walter Withers, Thea Proctor, Charles Bush, Roland Wakelin, Rupert Bunny, William Lister Lister, Sydney Long, Robert Russell, Edward Roper, James Alfred Turner, Penliegh Boyd, Adelaide Ironside. Kozminsky Galleries, 421 Bourke Street, Melbourne
- 2014: Anthea Polson Gallery

== Collections ==
- Art Gallery of Western Australia
- Museum an Art Gallery of the Northern Territory
- Artbank
- Royal Art Society of New South Wales
- Australian National University collection
- Private collections of the Prince and Princess of Wales, President Suharto of Indonesia, Sir Harry Gibbs, Time Life, the Von Thyssen and Getty foundations, and those of Estée Lauder and Margaret Rockefeller
