= Cecilia Smith =

Cecilia Smith may refer to:

- Cecilia Smith (activist), Australian Aboriginal activist
- Cecilia Smith (rugby union), Australian rugby union player
- Cecile de Wentworth, née Cecilia Smith, American portrait artist
