= Beaudesert War Memorial =

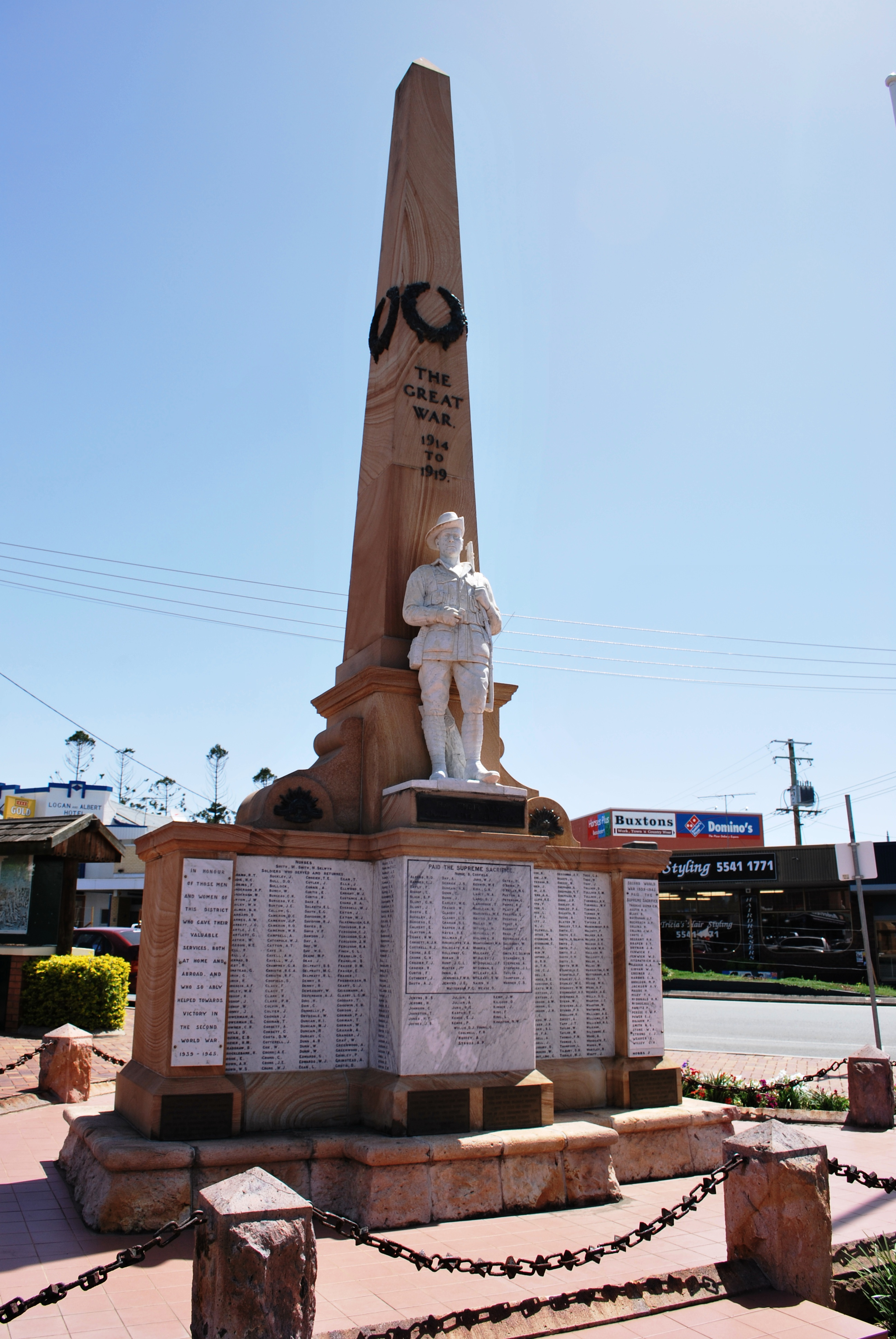
- Beaudesert War Memorial, 2008

- Location within Queensland Location within Australia
- 27.9885°S 152.9961°E
- Location: William Street, Beaudesert, Queensland, Australia

History
- Design period: 1919–1930s (interwar period)
- Built: 1919–1921

Queensland Heritage Register
- Official name: Beaudesert War Memorial
- Type: state heritage (built)
- Designated: 21 October 1992
- Reference no.: 600028
- Significant period: 1919–
- Significant components: views to, memorial surrounds/railings, memorial – obelisk, memorial – soldier statue

Beaudesert War Memorial is a heritage-listed memorial at William Street, Beaudesert, Queensland, Australia. It was built from 1919 to 1921. It was added to the Queensland Heritage Register on 21 October 1992.

== History ==
The Beaudesert War Memorial was erected between 1919 and 1921. It was designed by Standard Masonry Works of Melbourne and constructed under the supervision of Brisbane architect, A H Conrad. The stone memorial records the names of the 524 local men who enlisted during the First World War, including the 91 who died as well as the names of those who died in the Second World War. It cost £1,340 and was the fourth most expensive memorial in Queensland.

The cost of the monument and the number of enlistments is reflective of the strong patriotism of the district. The number of enlistments is above both the state and national averages and the cost is comparatively high for a rural district.

The memorial is situated on a triangular piece of land at the centre to town. This site was originally part of William Duckett White and George Robinson's Beaudesert Run and was at the intersection formed where the roads from Nindooinbah Homestead, Telemon and Kerry Stations met the Brisbane Road. Beaudesert was one of the few private Queensland towns. It was never gazetted, and buildings were erected before surveying and subdivision occurred. This corner site has always been triangular in form.

By 1908 the site was a fenced grass enclosure on a road reserve and in about 1913 a tree was planted on the site, in honour of William Tutin Walker, a local businessman. Walker arrived in the district in 1865 and established a sugar plantation with Captain Robert Towns. He became an important member of the community, sitting on both the Divisional Board and the local Council.

In May 1918 a public meeting was held and the Beaudesert and District Soldiers' Memorial Fund Committee was formed to raise money for the construction of a district war memorial.

The committee acquired the use of the triangular site from the Council in 1918 and arranged for the Walker tree to be moved. By February 1919, £786 had been subscribed and design tenders were advertised in Brisbane, Sydney and Melbourne papers.

Australia, and Queensland in particular, had few civic monuments before the First World War. The memorials erected in its wake became our first national monuments, recording the devastating impact of the war on a young nation. Australia lost 60,000 from a population of about 4 million, representing one in five of those who served. No previous or subsequent war has made such an impact on the nation.

Even before the end of the war, memorials became a spontaneous and highly visible expression of national grief. To those who erected them, they were as sacred as grave sites, substitute graves for the Australians whose bodies lay in battlefield cemeteries in Europe and the Middle East. British policy decreed that the Empire war dead were to be buried where they fell. The word "cenotaph", commonly applied to war memorials at the time, literally means "empty tomb".

Australian war memorials are distinctive in that they commemorate not only the dead. Australians were proud that their first great national army, unlike other belligerent armies, was composed entirely of volunteers, men worthy of honour whether or not they made the supreme sacrifice. Many memorials honour all who served from a locality, not just the dead, providing valuable evidence of community involvement in the war. Such evidence is not readily obtainable from military records, or from state or national listings, where names are categorised alphabetically or by military unit.

Australian war memorials are also valuable evidence of imperial and national loyalties, at the time, not seen as conflicting; the skills of local stonemasons, metalworkers and architects; and of popular taste. In Queensland, the soldier statue was the popular choice of memorial, whereas the obelisk predominated in the southern states, possibly a reflection of Queensland's larger working-class population and a lesser involvement of architects.

Many of the First World War monuments have been updated to record local involvement in later conflicts, and some have fallen victim to unsympathetic re-location and repair.

Although there are many different types of memorials in Queensland, the digger statue is the most common. It was the most popular choice of communities responsible for erecting the memorials, embodying the ANZAC Spirit and representing the qualities of the ideal Australian: loyalty, courage, youth, innocence and masculinity. The digger was a phenomenon peculiar to Queensland, perhaps due to the fact that other states had followed Britain's lead and established Advisory Boards made up of architects and artists, prior to the erection of war memorials. The digger statue was not highly regarded by artists and architects who were involved in the design of relatively few Queensland memorials.

Most statues were constructed by local masonry firms, although some were by artists or imported.

The design for the Beaudesert memorial was open to a nationwide competition. Brisbane architect A H Conrad of Atkinson and Conrad was employed to examine the designs and supervise the memorial's erection. The designs were also subject to public scrutiny.

Arnold Henry Conrad was born in Melbourne in 1887. He came to Queensland and worked for the Government as a draftsman and architect. In 1918 he entered a partnership with Henry Atkinson which continued in various forms until 1939. It is not known to what extent he contributed to the design of the Beaudesert War Memorial, although it is known that he made slight alterations.

The successful design was submitted by Standard Masonry Works of Melbourne however they were not able to carry out the construction and in June 1920 Brisbane masons W E Parsons accepted the construction tender.

On 10 December 1919, the foundation stone was laid by the Mayoress of Beaudesert, Mrs H L McDonald and the completed work was unveiled by the Governor, Sir Matthew Nathan on 28 September 1921. A flagpole, trench mortar and field gun were subsequently installed but the military hardware disappeared during the Second World War. Since 1922 plaques for ensuing military conflicts have been added.

The site is regarded as a reserve and in 1925 three trustees were appointed, the Mayor of the Town of Beaudesert and the Chairmen of Beaudesert and Tambourine Shire Councils. In 1953 the Beaudesert Shire Council was appointed the Trustee and has been responsible for the maintenance of the memorial since.

== Description ==
The First World War Memorial is situated on a traffic island in the intersection of Brisbane and William Streets in the centre of Beaudesert. The island is enclosed by a fence comprising rough-cut porphyry blocks, margined and chiselled, with pyramidal tops. These are linked by decorative metal chains. A narrow garden bed is located outside the fence line.

The sandstone memorial stands 33 feet (10 m) high and comprises a substantial pedestal surmounted by a digger statue and an obelisk. Sandstone lions on rough-cut porphyry bases are located at two corners of the triangle, facing outwards. In front of the east facing lion is a metal drinking fountain.

The monument sits on a sloping rough-cut step with a flat top plate with semi-circular edges. Surmounting this is a smooth-faced step with chamfered top, above which is the pedestal dado. This is smooth-faced, rectangular in plan and divided into five bays of equal height and varying width. The end and central bays project outward, with the central bay of the front face projecting further to form a pedestal for the digger statue. The whole of the pedestal is capped by a shallow cornice.

The front face of the pedestal dado displays marble plates bearing the leaded names of the local men who served in the First World War. Additional plates bear the names of those who died in the Second World War, creating a total of 557 names. Small bronze plaques attached to the second step commemorate the Malayan, Korean, Borneo and Vietnam conflicts. The foundation stone is located on the lower section of the rear central bay.

Surmounting the front central bay is a life-sized digger statue. He stands completely at ease, with his collar unbuttoned and a pipe in his right hand. The left hand holds a rifle which is slung over the left shoulder. He is described as "just released from duty".

The digger statue stands in front of an obelisk which rises from a smooth-faced square plinth with a shallow cornice. On either side of the plinth rest stylised scrolls with bronze AIF badges on the front faces. The obelisk tapers sharply to a pyramidal apex and has bronze wreaths positioned on each face. Below the wreath on the front face, the words THE GREAT WAR 1916 TO 1919 appear in bronze.

== Heritage listing ==
Beaudesert War Memorial was listed on the Queensland Heritage Register on 21 October 1992 having satisfied the following criteria.

The place is important in demonstrating the evolution or pattern of Queensland's history.

War Memorials are important in demonstrating the pattern of Queensland's history as they are representative of a recurrent theme that involved most communities throughout the state. They provide evidence of an era of widespread Australian patriotism and nationalism, particularly during and following the First World War. The monuments manifest a unique documentary record and are demonstrative of popular taste in the inter-war period.

The place demonstrates rare, uncommon or endangered aspects of Queensland's cultural heritage.

This particular memorial is also of aesthetic significance, as one of the most elaborately and unusually designed monuments in Queensland still surviving in its intact surrounds. It is of uncommonly large scale and forms a dominant landmark within the townscape

The place is important in demonstrating the principal characteristics of a particular class of cultural places.

Erected between 1919 and 1921, the memorial at Beaudesert demonstrates the principal characteristics of a commemorative structure erected as an enduring record of a major historical event. This is achieved through the use of appropriate materials and design elements. As a digger statue it is representative of the most popular form of memorial in Queensland although the digger is unusual as it is portrayed in an unusually relaxed stance.

The place is important because of its aesthetic significance.

This particular memorial is also of aesthetic significance, as one of the most elaborately and unusually designed monuments in Queensland still surviving in its intact surrounds. It is of uncommonly large scale and forms a dominant landmark within the townscape.

The place has a strong or special association with a particular community or cultural group for social, cultural or spiritual reasons.

The memorial has a strong association with the community as evidence of the impact of a major historic event and with monumental mason W E Parsons as a good example of his work.

The place has a special association with the life or work of a particular person, group or organisation of importance in Queensland's history.

The memorial has a strong association with the community as evidence of the impact of a major historic event and with monumental mason W E Parsons as a good example of his work.
