= Edward Roper =

Edward Roper may refer to:

- Edward Roper (cricketer) (1851–1921), English cricketer
- Edward Roper (artist) (1854–1909), Canadian painter, illustrator and naturalist
