= Nindooinbah Dam =

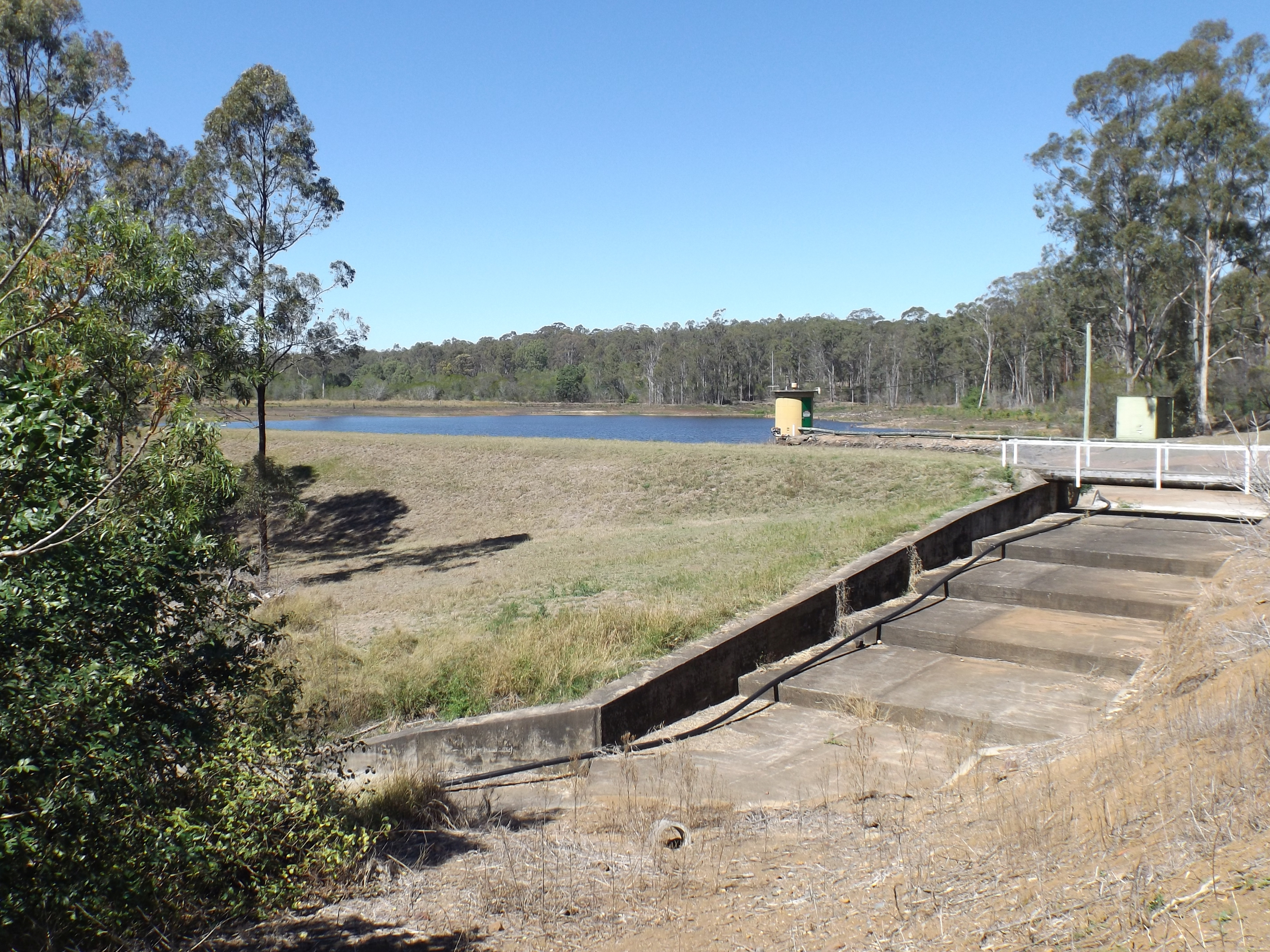
- Dam wall and spillway, 2014

- Location of the Nindooinbah Dam in Queensland
- Country: Australia
- Location: Scenic Rim, South East Queensland
- Coordinates: 27.9956°S 153.0308°E
- Purpose: Water supply (1951–2014); Recreation (since 2014)
- Status: Decommissioned
- Opening date: 1951
- Operator: SEQ Water

Dam and spillways
- Type of dam: Earth fill dam
- Impounds: Off-stream
- Length: 240 m (790 ft)
- Spillway type: Uncontrolled

Reservoir
- Creates: Lake Nindooinbah
- Total capacity: 322 ML (261 acre⋅ft)
- Active capacity: 270 ML (220 acre⋅ft)
- Inactive capacity: 52 ML (42 acre⋅ft)
- Catchment area: 55 ha (140 acres)
- Normal elevation: 122.8 m (403 ft) AHD (Note: Reported in 2010, prior to decommissioning in 2013.)
- Website seqwater.com.au

The Nindooinbah Dam is a decommissioned earth-fill embankment dam with an un-gated spillway located off-stream in Beaudesert in the South East region of Queensland, Australia. The dam was completed in 1951 and the resultant reservoir is called Lake Nindooinbah. It was used for potable water supply until 1 March 2014 when it was decommissioned, and it has been used for recreational purposes since 2014.

== Location and features ==
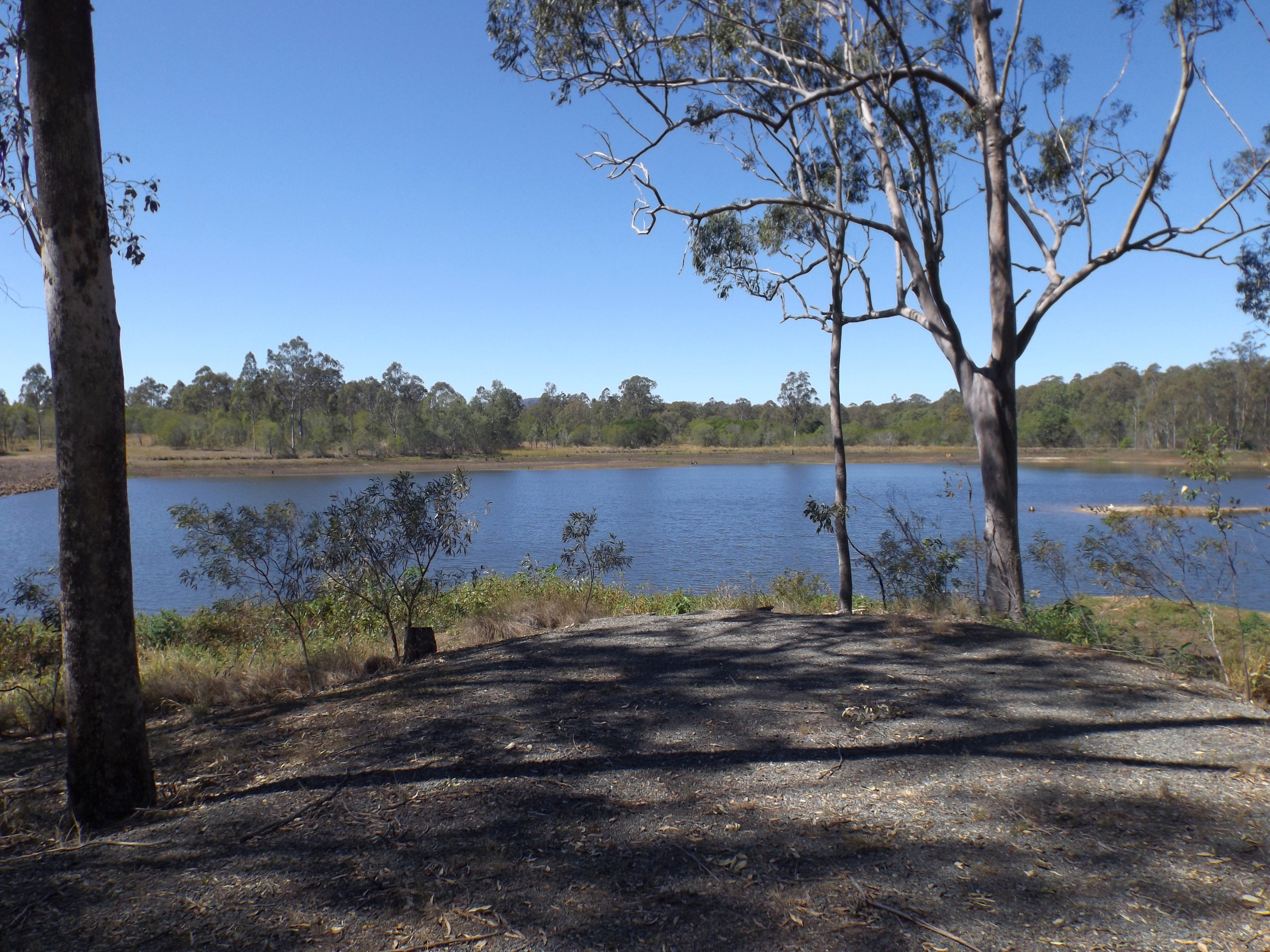
Lake, 2014

Located near the town of Beaudesert in the Scenic Rim region, the Nindooinbah Dam was completed in 1951 and decommissioned following a dam safety review in 2012–13 by the dam operator, SEQ Water. The review identified that soil erosion in the embankment at Nindooinbah was possible; and that the dam did not meet the required standards set by regulators. To reduce risk, the dam wall was lowered by 3 metres (9.8 ft), reducing the capacity of the small reservoir by approximately twenty percent, from a maximum of 322 megalitres (261 acre⋅ft) to its new full capacity level of 270 megalitres (220 acre⋅ft) that took effect on 1 March 2014. The reservoir draws from a catchment area of 55 hectares (140 acres). The reservoir ceased being used to supply water in 2014 and does not form part of the SEQ Water Grid.

Non-powered boating is permitted on the dam and public access is available to the dam wall embankment area. Passive recreational activities are permitted.

== See also ==
- List of dams in Queensland
