= Beaudesert Times =

Newspaper in Queensland, Australia

The Beaudesert Times is a newspaper published in Beaudesert, Queensland, Australia.

== History ==
The newspaper was a result of the merger of two existing newspapers, The Beaudesert Despatch and Logan and Albert Leader and The Beaudesert Herald with politician Patrick James Leahy holding the controlling interest. John Adamson Walker and F. Parker had formerly run the Herald and they became manager and editor respectively of the new paper. After Parker left, Walker became the managing editor. The first issue was published on 10 October 1908; it cost threepence.

In March 1967 it was renamed the Logan and Albert Times, but returned to being the Beaudesert Times in 1985.

In 2012, the newspaper was purchased by Fairfax Regional Media.
