= Beaudesert, Queensland =

Beaudesert Yilbagan (Yugambeh)
- Town
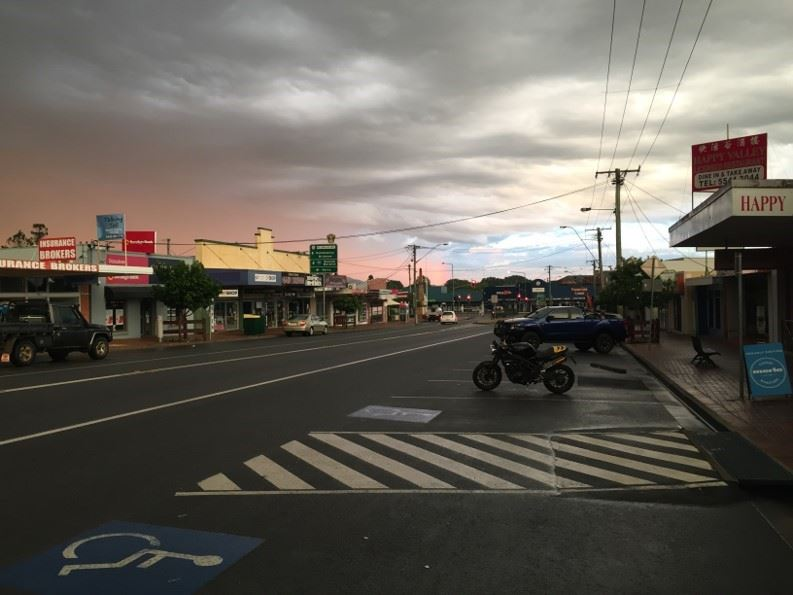
- William Street at dawn, 2021

- Interactive map of Beaudesert
- Coordinates: 27.9880°S 152.9958°E
- Country: Australia
- State: Queensland
- LGA: Scenic Rim Region
- Location: 57.8 km (35.9 mi) W of Surfers Paradise; 69.9 km (43.4 mi) S of Brisbane
- Established: 1870s

Government
  - State electorate: Scenic Rim
  - Federal division: Wright

Area
  - Total: 43.6 km^{2} (16.8 sq mi)
- Elevation: 50 m (160 ft)

Population
  - Total: 6,752 (2021 census)
  - Density: 154.86/km^{2} (401.1/sq mi)
- Time zone: UTC+10:00 (AEST)
- Postcode: 4285
- Mean max temp: 25.6 °C (78.1 °F)
- Mean min temp: 12.6 °C (54.7 °F)
- Annual rainfall: 905.4 mm (35.65 in)
Localities around Beaudesert
Gleneagle	Veresdale	Birnam
Bromelton	Beaudesert	Tabragalba
Josephville	Cryna; Kerry	Nindooinbah

Beaudesert (Yugambeh: Yilbagan) is a rural town and locality in the Scenic Rim Region of Queensland, Australia. Beaudesert is the administrative centre for the Scenic Rim Region. In the 2021 census, the locality of Beaudesert had a population of 6,752 people.

== Geography ==
Beaudesert is located on the Mount Lindesay Highway, some 70 kilometres (43 mi) south of Brisbane and west of the Gold Coast.

The area sources its income predominantly from rural activities such as cropping, grazing and equine activities, as well as tourism.

The Logan River forms most of the western boundary of the locality.

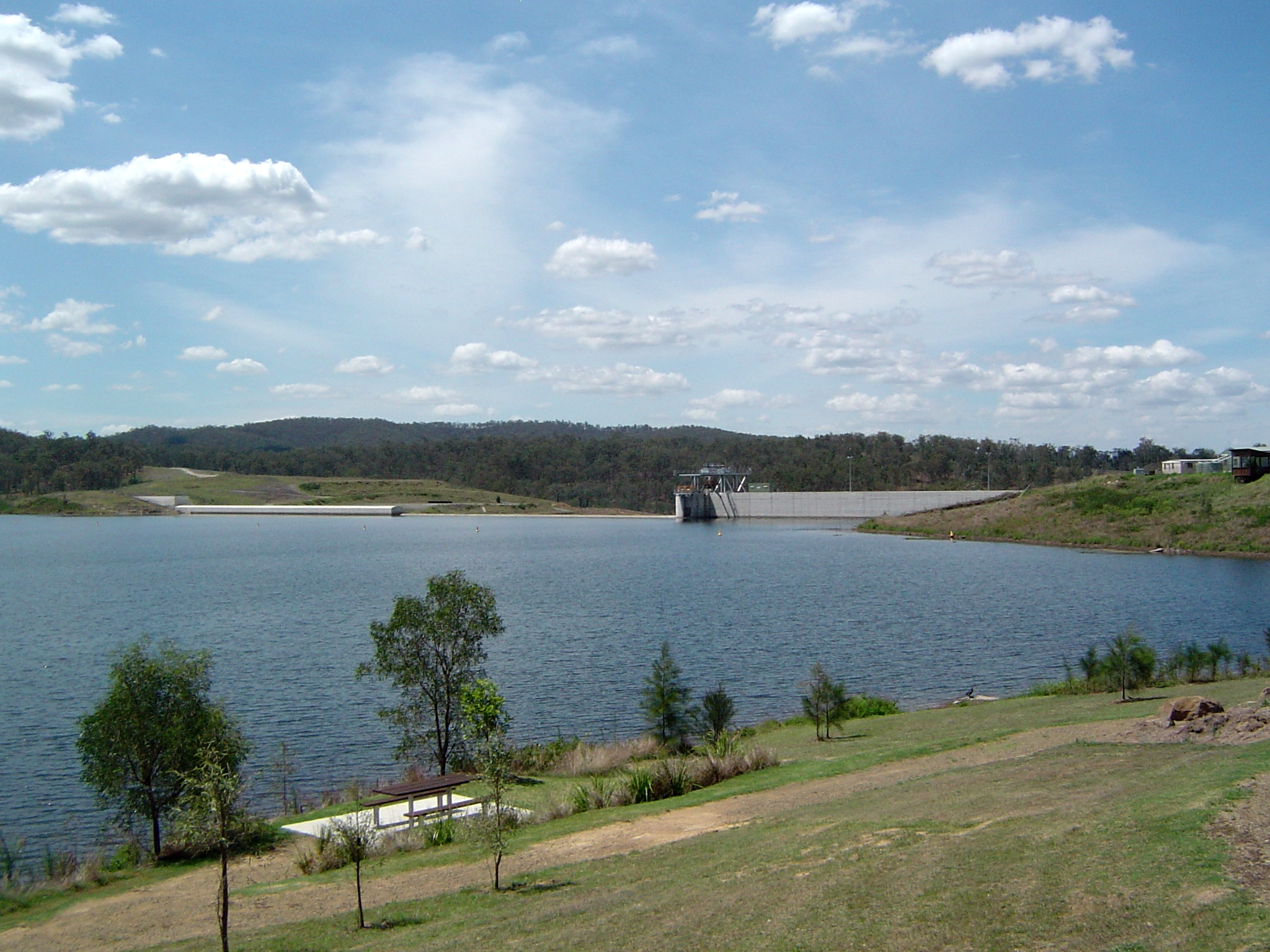
Wyaralong Dam, 2012

The town of Beaudesert is located 70 metres (230 ft) above sea level.

In the east of the locality is the decommissioned Nindooinbah Dam (27.9956°S 153.0308°E).

=== Climate ===
Beaudesert experiences a humid subtropical climate (Köppen: Cfa), having hot, wet summers with frequent thunderstorms and mild, dry winters with cool nights, averaging 15–20 ground frosts annually. The maximum recorded temperature is 44.6 °C (112.3 °F) on 4 January 2014, and the coldest recorded temperature is −5.5 °C (22.1 °F) on 11 July 1972. The lowest maximum temperature of 12.8 °C (55.0 °F) was recorded on 4 July 2022, and the highest minimum temperature of 27.0 °C (80.6 °F) was recorded on 27 January 2024. Historical temperature extremes are only available from between 1967 and 1979, and then again from 2007.

Beaudesert has an average annual rainfall of around 916 millimetres (36.1 in) per year, the vast majority of which falls in summer, with a high annual variability. 2019 saw the driest year on record, with a mere 395.4mm measured. The wettest year on record was 1893, with 1,726.5mm measured. Beaudesert can experience significant and severe storms in the warmer months, producing flash flooding, large hail, and more rarely tornadoes.

Climate data for Beaudesert (27º58'12"S, 152º59'24"E, 48 m AMSL) (2007–present normals and 1887–present extremes)
Month	Jan	Feb	Mar	Apr	May	Jun	Jul	Aug	Sep	Oct	Nov	Dec	Year
Record high °C (°F)	44.6 (112.3)	43.1 (109.6)	38.4 (101.1)	36.2 (97.2)	31.8 (89.2)	28.5 (83.3)	29.1 (84.4)	35.9 (96.6)	39.1 (102.4)	39.8 (103.6)	43.1 (109.6)	42.3 (108.1)	44.6 (112.3)
Mean daily maximum °C (°F)	31.4 (88.5)	30.7 (87.3)	29.3 (84.7)	27.0 (80.6)	24.2 (75.6)	21.9 (71.4)	21.6 (70.9)	23.5 (74.3)	26.2 (79.2)	28.2 (82.8)	29.9 (85.8)	30.8 (87.4)	27.1 (80.7)
Mean daily minimum °C (°F)	19.4 (66.9)	19.1 (66.4)	18.0 (64.4)	14.0 (57.2)	9.8 (49.6)	7.3 (45.1)	6.2 (43.2)	6.6 (43.9)	10.1 (50.2)	13.2 (55.8)	16.1 (61.0)	18.2 (64.8)	13.2 (55.7)
Record low °C (°F)	11.6 (52.9)	12.2 (54.0)	7.2 (45.0)	2.0 (35.6)	−1.7 (28.9)	−3.2 (26.2)	−5.5 (22.1)	−3.8 (25.2)	−1.0 (30.2)	3.0 (37.4)	4.6 (40.3)	9.4 (48.9)	−5.5 (22.1)
Average precipitation mm (inches)	149.7 (5.89)	115.3 (4.54)	135.2 (5.32)	44.3 (1.74)	61.6 (2.43)	38.4 (1.51)	29.9 (1.18)	26.9 (1.06)	35.0 (1.38)	73.6 (2.90)	83.5 (3.29)	124.9 (4.92)	915.2 (36.03)
Average precipitation days (≥ 1.0 mm)	8.4	7.4	9.4	5.1	6.2	4.2	4.4	3.1	4.0	7.0	6.9	9.6	75.7
Source: Bureau of Meteorology (2007–2024 normals and extremes)

== History ==
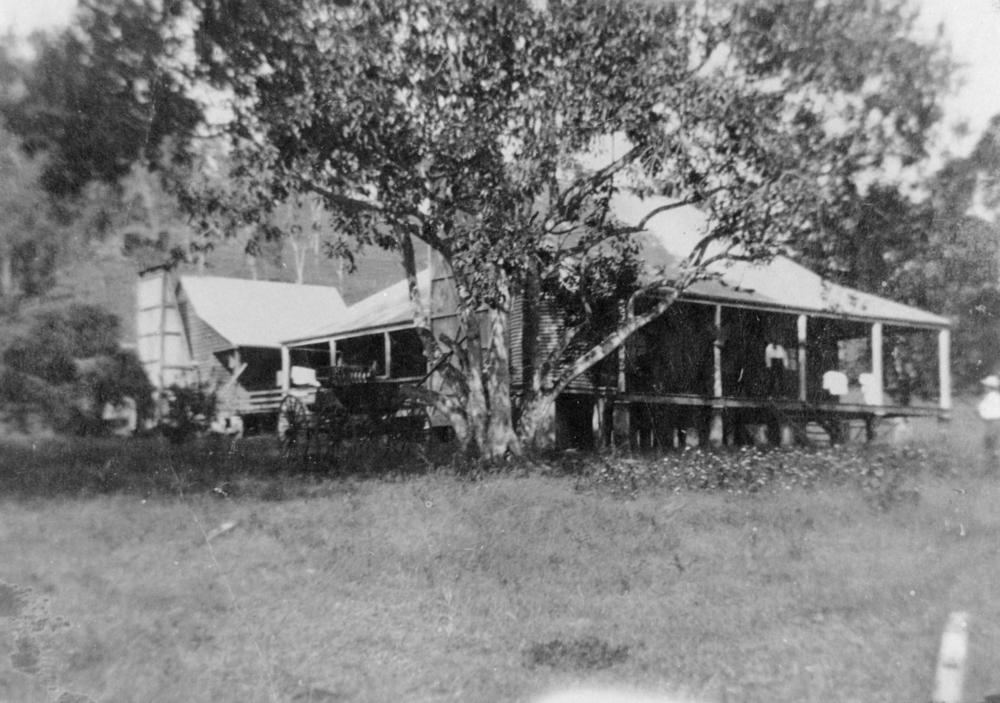
A homestead in the 1890s

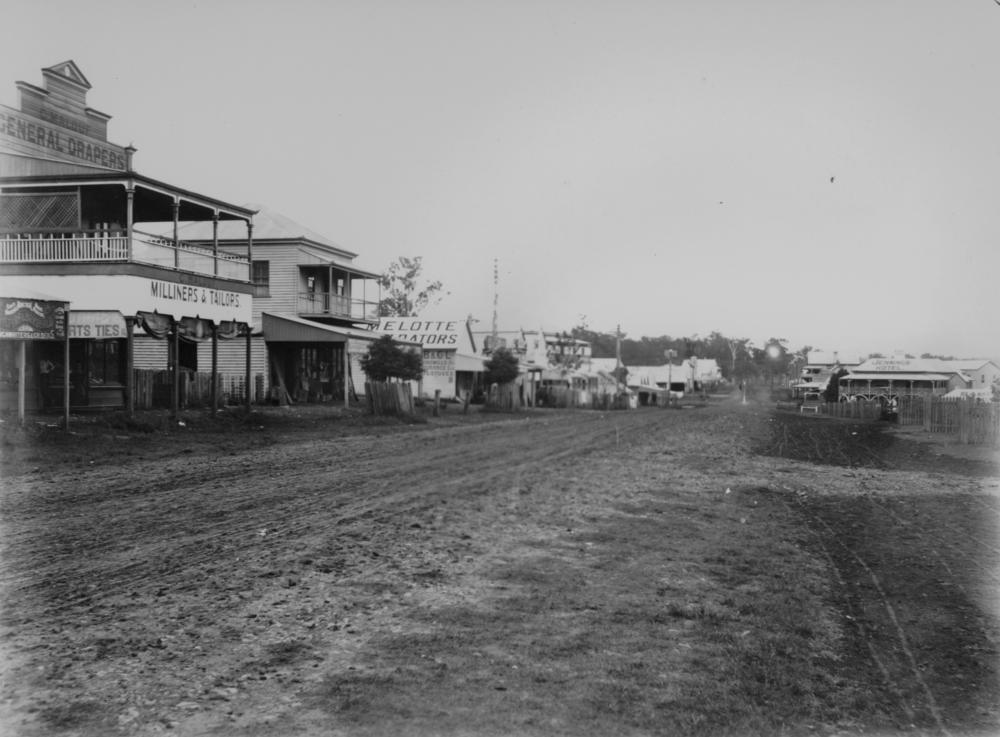
Brisbane Street, 1908

Mununjali (also known as Mananjahli, Manaldjahli and Manandjali) is a dialect of the Yugambeh language. The Mununjali language area includes landscape within the local government boundaries of the Scenic Rim and Beaudesert Shire Councils.

Nindooinbah pastoral run was established in 1842. Its original homestead was built in 1850.

The name Beaudesert comes from pastoral run name used by Edwin Hawkens (or Hawkins) in 1842.

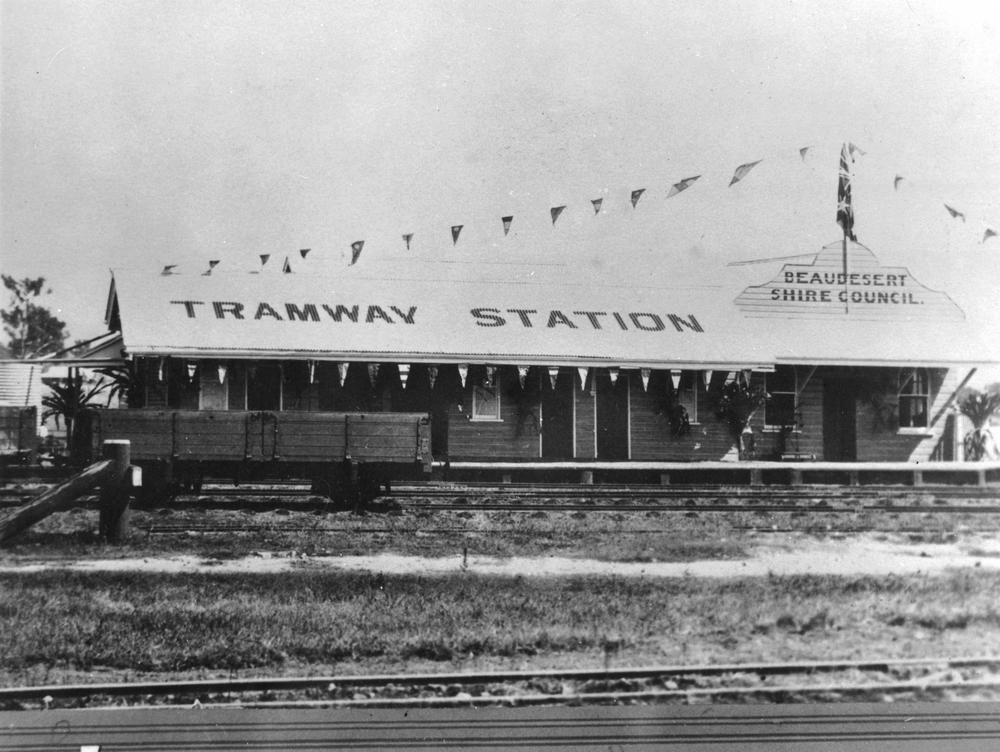
Beaudesert Tramway station in 1927

Located in the Beaudesert Historical Museum is the Milbanks Pioneer Cottage. This cottage was originally built in 1875 by Patrick Milbanks on his Kerry property, out of local hand-hewn timbers, slats and shingle roof. It has four-poster bed, large cedar sideboard and numerous articles that portray the life of the early pioneers.

Upper Beaudesert Provisional School opened circa 1882 and closed circa 1885.

Beaudesert Provisional School opened on 26 March 1882 but closed on 9 September 1886. On 13 September 1887, it reopened as Beaudesert State School.

On 15 August 1885 at Stretton's Hotel at Beaudesert, auctioneer C.J. Warner offered 125 town lots in the Beaudesert Township Extension estate. The lots were mostly 2 roods (0.50 acres; 2,000 m^{2}) and were on Brisbane Street, Tubber Street, Gordon Street, Birman Street, James Street, Edward Street and Alice Street. The advertising noted that the Queensland Government had voted the funds to extend the railway line from Logan Village to Beaudesert.

The Beaudesert Hotel was built in 1885, but burned down in 1940 and was replaced.

The Beaudesert railway line from Bethania to Beaudesert opened on 16 May 1888. Beaudesert railway station (27.9853°S 152.9950°E) served the town. Use of the passenger services declined with the increasing ownership of cars following World War II, leading to the termination of the passenger services in 1961. However the Beaudesert abattoir and the dairy farmers continued to use the freight services on the line until freight services terminated on 20 May 1996.

On Tuesday 24 July 1888, the foundation log of St Thomas' Anglican church was laid by Mrs De Burgh Persse of Tabragalba with an address given by Archdeacon Nathaniel Dawes. On 24 November 1956 the foundation stone for a new church was laid by the Governor of Queensland, John Lavarack, and blessed by Archbishop Reginald Halse.The second St Thomas' Anglican Church was consecrated on Sunday 4 July 1965 by Archbishop Philip Strong. The 1888 church was used as the church hall.

On 3 February 1889, Roman Catholic Archbishop Robert Dunne blessed the foundation stone for the first Catholic church in Beaudesert. The event raised £74 with a further £7 pledged. As 2 February was the Feast of the Purification of the Blessed Virgin Mary, it was decided to call the church Our Lady of the Purification, but it was commonly known as St Mary's. Dunne returned on 2 June 1889 to open the new church. Internally the church was 50 by 28 feet (15.2 m × 8.5 m) with 14-foot (4.3 m) ceilings. It was built by James Madden of Ipswich, who design the church for free. It was fitted with an altar, altar rails and 20 pews. On Sunday 15 September 1907 the second St Mary's was opened, with the original church dismantled and re-assembled at Kerry where it was named St John's Catholic Church.

In 1897 a Baptist church was opened in Beaudesert on land purchased for that purpose in 1889. The foundation stone was laid in April 1897 and the church was officially opened on Wednesday 16 June 1897.

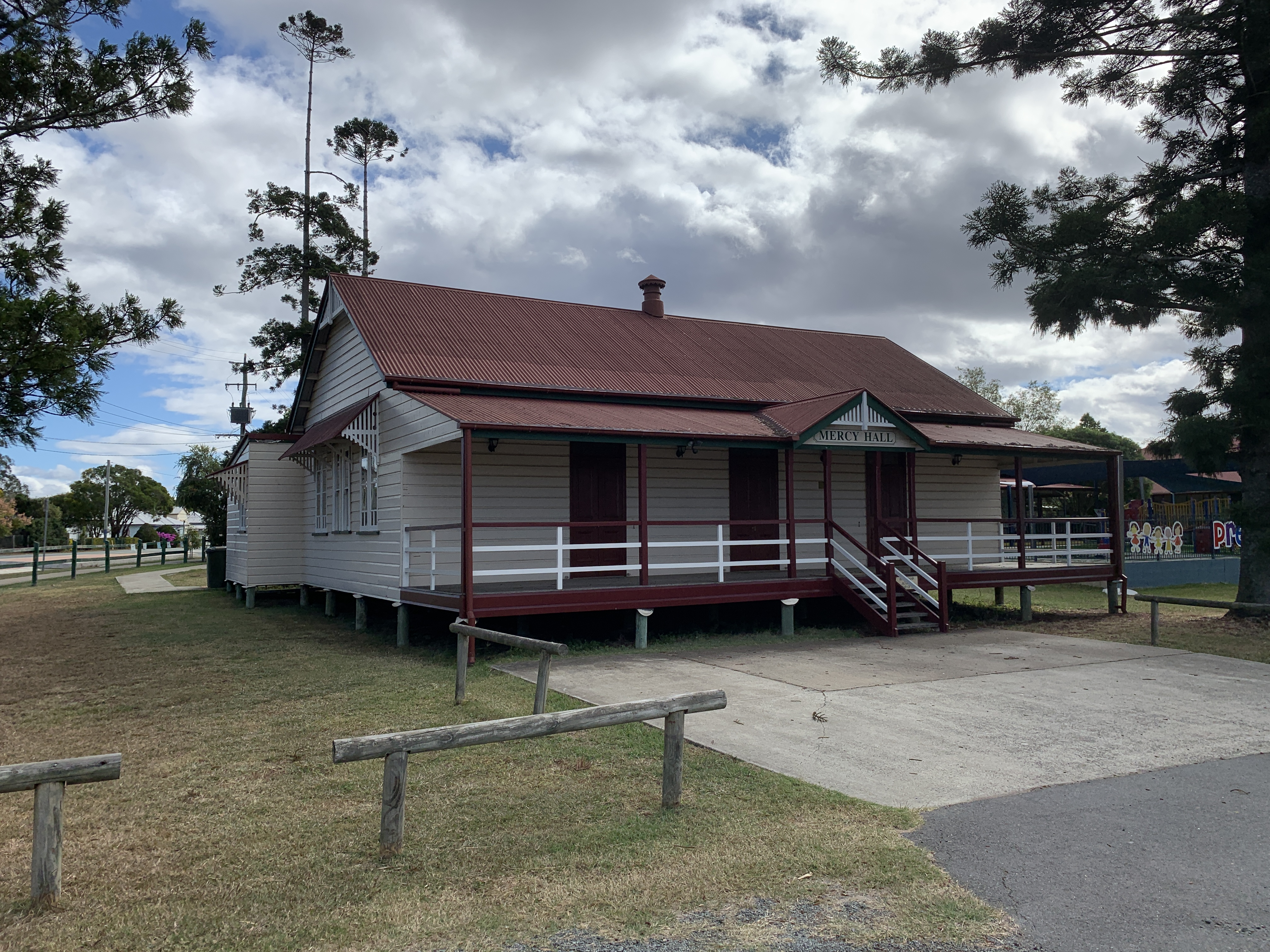
Mercy Hall, the original school building, of St Mary's Catholic School, 2020

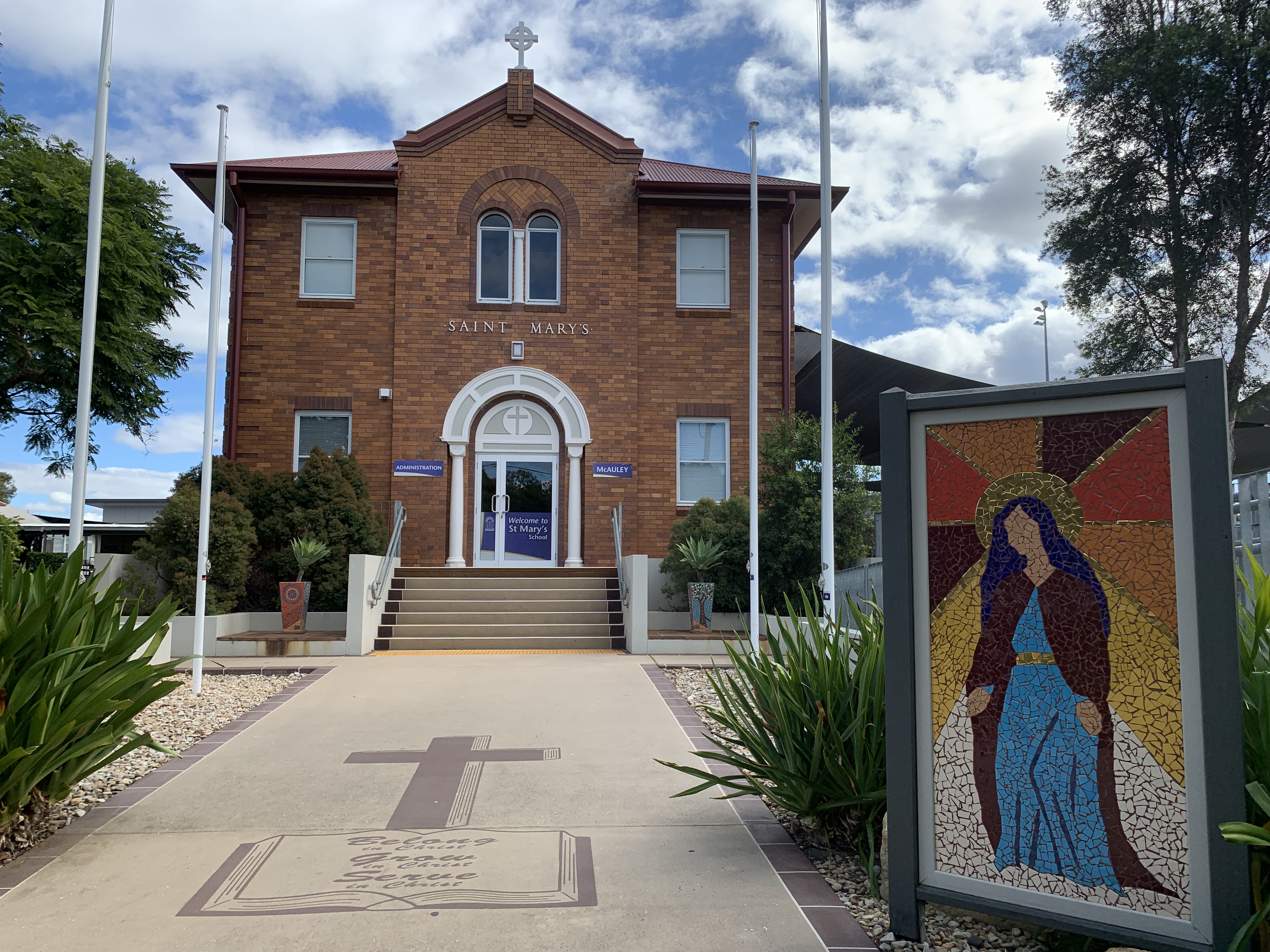
Brick school building, St Mary's Catholic School, 2020

On 14 April 1901, the foundation stone was laid for St Mary's Convent School. The school opened on 19 August 1901 with an initial enrolment of 101 students and was operated by the Sisters of Mercy. The original timber building remained in use until 1939 when its condition was becoming dangerous. The school operated temporarily from the church until a new brick building was erected. The brick building was blessed and opened by Archbishop James Duhig on 3 September 1939. The timber building remains on the site as Mercy Hall. Further buildings were added over the years. On 19 August 2013, the 1939 brick building was badly damaged by a fire. However, the exterior and stained glass windows survived and the building was rebuilt, re-opening on 20 February 2015; it is now used for school administration.

On 17 December 1901 auctioneers M. Selwyn Smith offered nine grazing and agricultural lots surrounding the town of the Beaudesert ranging in size from 137 to 607 acres (55 to 246 ha; 0.55 to 2.46 km^{2}), totalling 2,235 acres (904 ha; 9.04 km^{2}). The land was being sold following the death of its owner Ernest White.

The Beaudesert Shire Tramway to Christmas Creek, Lamington and Rathdowney, operated by the Beaudesert Shire, opened in 1903 and closed in 1944.

The Logan and Albert Co-operative Butter Factory opened in 1904 and closed 1987.

A local newspaper, the Beaudesert Times was established in 1908.

The Beaudesert RSL Sub Branch opened in Jane Street in 1919.

The Beaudesert War Museum was unveiled on 28 September 1921 by Queensland Governor Matthew Nathan.

The Duke and Duchess of York visited Beaudesert in 1927.

L & A Hotel opened in 1934.

In 1936 ex-prime minister Billy Hughes was injured in a plane crash during an emergency landing in Wood's Paddock.

From the nineteenth century through to the 1980s, it was a thriving centre with a shoe factory and meat works as well as markets, a hospital and an ambulance service. The Enright family managed a major department store. The Blunck family managed an electrical store and a car servicing and sales business.

The Seventh-day Adventist Church was officially opened on Sunday 20 August 1949 by Pastor F. A. Mote, of Sydney, the secretary of the Australasian Inter-Union Conference, and foundation stone for the Beaudesert Baptist Church was laid on 8 October 1949 by C.G. Sweetman, President of the Baptist Union in Queensland.

From 1954 to 1962, the Beaudesert State School also provided a secondary school program, which ceased when a separate Beaudesert State High School was opened in January 1963.

From 1961 until 2001, the controversial child-welfare organisation BoysTown operated in Beaudesert. It had the largest case of child abuse at a single institution in Australia's history.

In 1999, the Biddaddaba History Group brought together the history of the area from the earliest settlement of white people up to 1990 in a comprehensive book available from libraries.

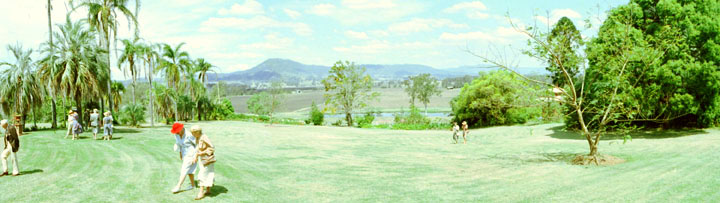
Nindooinbah House, 1939

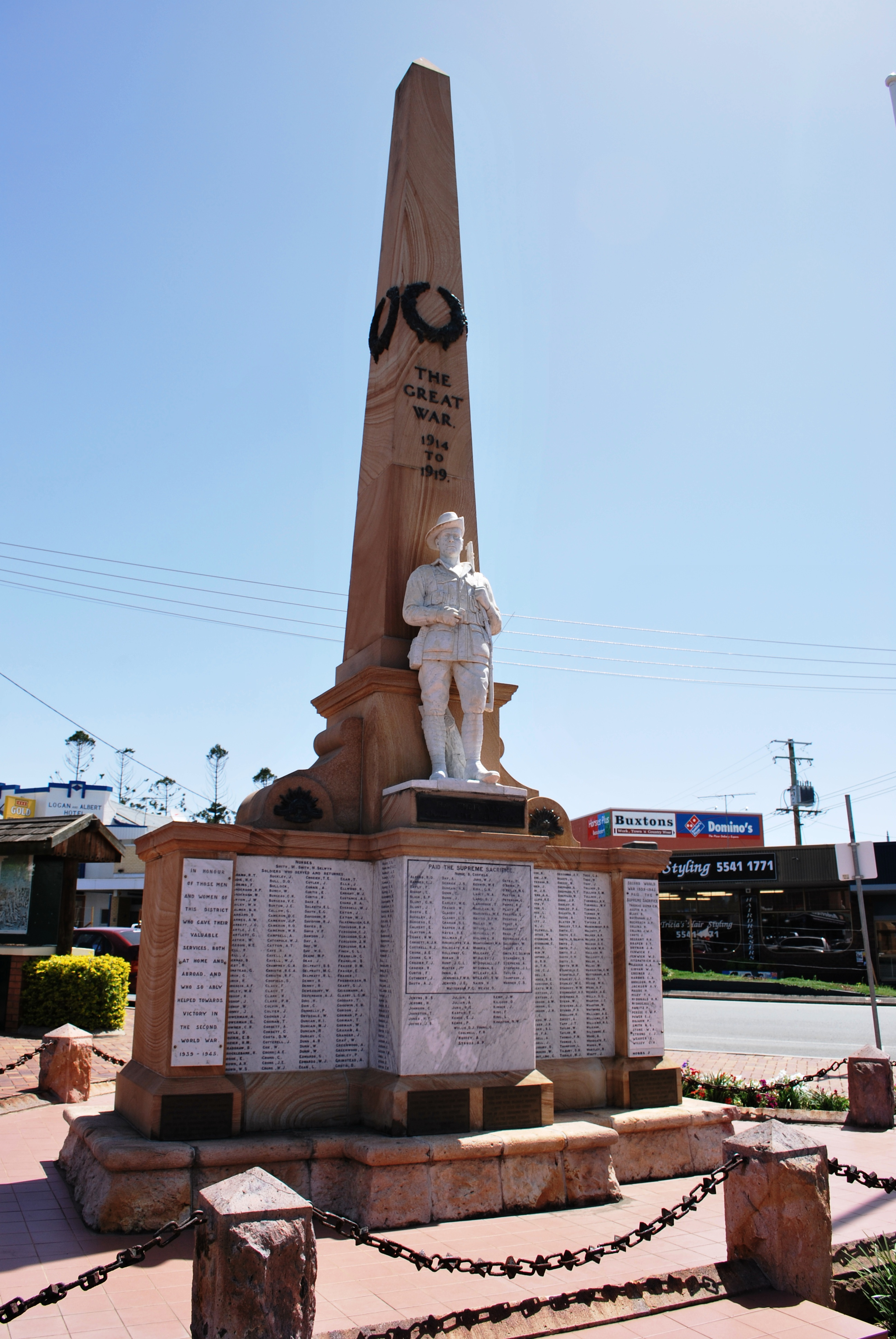
Beaudesert War Memorial

Prior to construction, the site of McAuley College was blessed by Archbishop of Brisbane, Mark Coleridge. It opened on 25 January 2017 with 36 students in Year 7. It was officially opened on 17 November 2017 by Scott Buchholz, Member for Wright with a blessing by Coleridge.

== Demographics ==
Year	Population
1881	25
1891	450
1911	1,330
1947	1,548
1961	2,930
1991	4,028
2001	4,460
2006	5,388
2011	5,999
2016	6,395
2021	6,752

In the 2016 census, the locality of Beaudesert had a population of 6,395 people. Aboriginal and Torres Strait Islander people made up 7.2% of the population. 80.6% of people were born in Australia. The next most common countries of birth were New Zealand 3.2% and England 2.7%. 89.7% of people only spoke English at home. The most common responses for religion were No Religion 23.4%, Anglican 21.3% and Catholic 21.2%.

In the 2021 census, the locality of Beaudesert had a population of 6,752 people.

== Heritage listings ==
Beaudesert has a number of heritage-listed sites, including:

- Beaudesert Showgrounds, Albert Street
- St Thomas’ Anglican Church, 7–9 Albert Street (27.9912°S 152.9988°E)
- Beaudesert Racecourse and Grandstand, 3180 Beaudesert–Boonah Road
- Beaudesert Masonic Centre, 33 Brisbane Street
- Beaudesert Hotel, 80 Brisbane Street
- Scenic Rim Regional Council Chambers, 82 & 84 Brisbane Street
- St Mary's Catholic Church, Bromelton Street
- Beaudesert War Memorial, William Street (27.9885°S 152.9961°E)

== Education ==
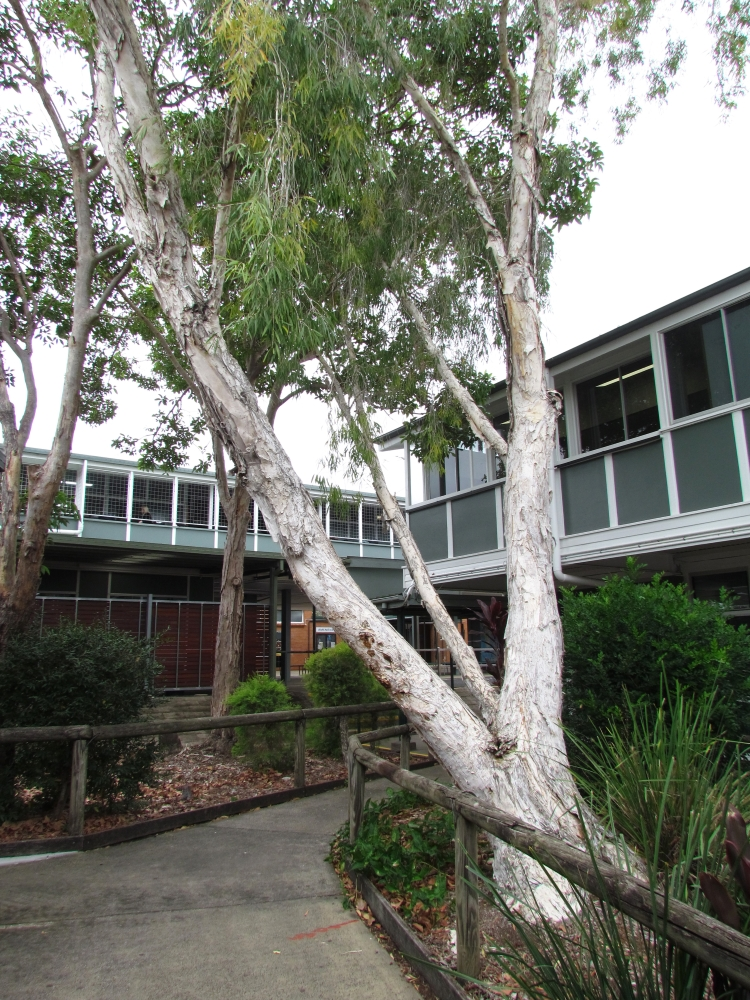
Beaudesert State High School, 2020

Beaudesert State School is a government primary (Early Childhood to Year 6) school for boys and girls at 17 Tina Street (27.9888°S 153.0023°E). In 2018, the school had an enrolment of 649 students with 49 teachers (43 full-time equivalent) and 29 non-teaching staff (20 full-time equivalent). It includes a special education program.

St Mary's Catholic Primary School is a Catholic primary (Prep–6) school for boys and girls at 1 Bromelton Street (27.9905°S 152.9913°E). In 2018, the school had an enrolment of 352 students with 26 teachers (22 full-time equivalent) and 19 non-teaching staff (11 full-time equivalent).

Beaudesert State High School is a government secondary (7–12) school for boys and girls at 271–297 Brisbane Street (27.9707°S 152.9970°E). In 2018, the school had an enrolment of 1442 students with 109 teachers (105 full-time equivalent) and 64 non-teaching staff (43 full-time equivalent). It includes a special education program.

McAuley College is a Catholic secondary (7–12) school for boys and girls at 30 Oakland Way (27.9897°S 153.0118°E). In 2018, the school had an enrolment of 93 students with 13 teachers (12 full-time equivalent) and 8 non-teaching staff (4 full-time equivalent).

== Amenities ==
The Scenic Rim Regional Council has its headquarters at the Beaudesert Administrative Centre at 82 Brisbane Street (formerly the offices of the Beaudesert Shire Council, 27.9872°S 152.9954°E).

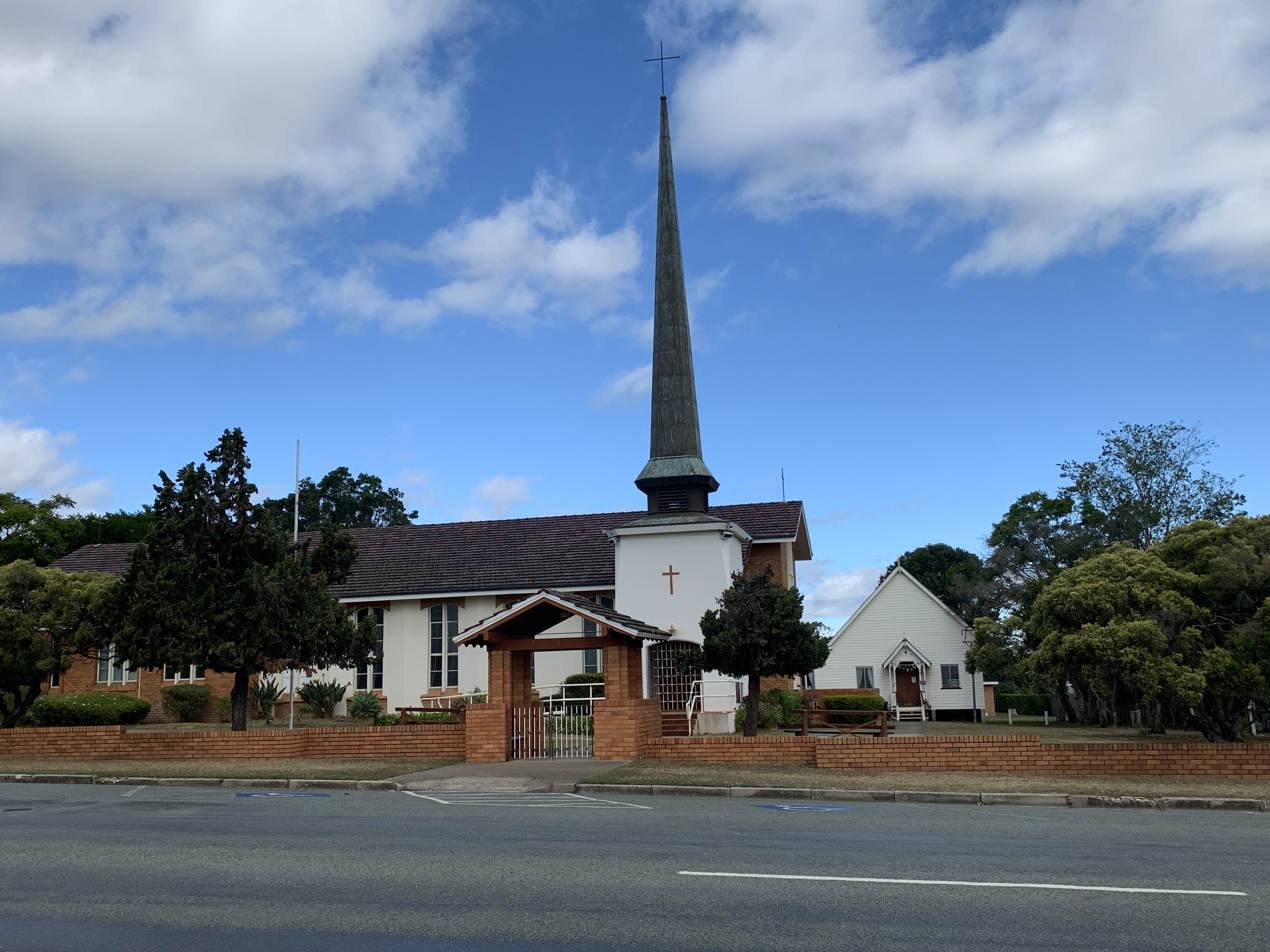
St Thomas' Anglican Church, with the former church (now hall) to the right and rear, 2020

The Scenic Rim Regional Council operates a public library at 58 Brisbane Street (27.9899°S 152.9958°E).

The Beaudesert branch of the Queensland Country Women's Association meets at 86 Brisbane Street (27.9867°S 152.9955°E).

St Thomas' Anglican Church is at 7 Albert Street (27.9913°S 152.9989°E).

St Mary's Catholic Church is in Bromelton Street (27.9887°S 152.9915°E) adjacent to the school.

Beaudesert Congregation Uniting Church is at 48 William Street (corner of Duckett Street, 27.9902°S 153.0003°E) adjacent to the former church building.

Beaudesert Baptist Church is at 13 Eaglesfield Street (27.9870°S 152.9988°E).

Beaudesert Seventh-day Adventist Church is at 45 Anna Street (27.9864°S 152.9990°E).

The Arts Centre hosts a number of community groups and there is a wide range of community activity including a very active Bush Bards group.

There is a rifle range and pistol club in Sprengler Road in neighbouring Tabragalba (27.9975°S 153.0683°E).

== Attractions ==
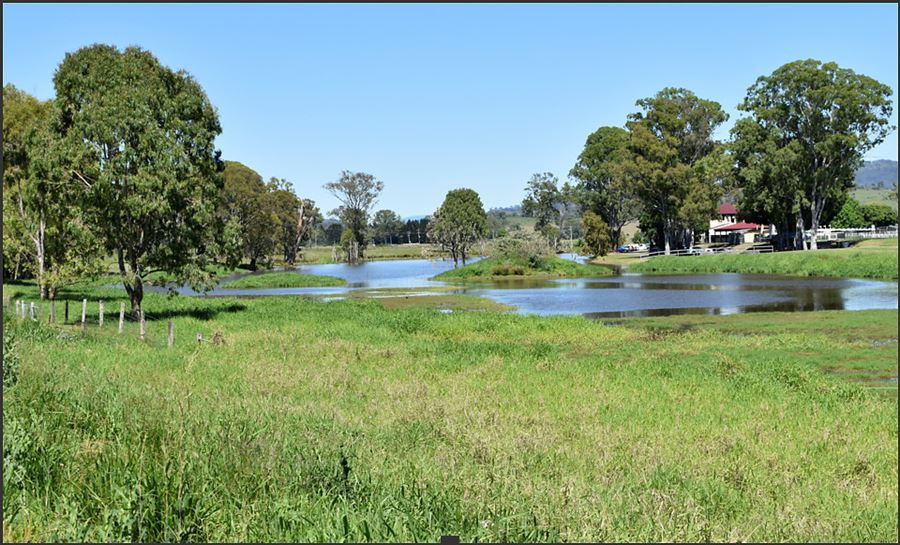
Il-Bogan Lagoon, 2022

Il-Bogan Lagoon is a waterhole in the west of the locality at 3169 Beaudesert Boonah Road (27.9933°S 152.9714°E). It is on the traditional lands of the Mununjali clan and they believe it is the home of a creature that moves through underground tunnels and waterways across their lands (sometimes referred to as a bunyip). British settlers also had sightings of strange creatures at the lagoon.

== Events ==
The annual agricultural show held in September is an event that includes a wide range of events and displays. It is run by the Beaudesert Show Society.

== Transport ==
=== Rail ===
The standard gauge Brisbane–Sydney railway line runs through Bromelton, a few kilometres west of Beaudesert. This line is used by NSW TrainLink Sydney to Brisbane XPT passenger services and Aurizon, Pacific National and SCT Logistics freight services to Sydney, Melbourne, Wollongong and Adelaide.

The Beaudesert railway line ran from the outer Brisbane suburb of Bethania to Beaudesert and was in regular use from 1886 to 1996.

A petition from railway enthusiasts, and considerable grants of government money, resulted in the line's re-opening in 1999 with team-driven tourist trains operating on the line from 2002 to 2003, after which it was forced to close having become financially unviable.

== Notable residents ==
- Neville Bonner, the first indigenous Australian to become a member of parliament, attended Beaudesert State Rural School.
- Caleb Daniel, current AFL player for North Melbourne Football Club.
- Jason Day, a leading PGA golfer who won the 2015 PGA championship, was born in Beaudesert.
- Riley Day, Australian sprinter, most notably competing in the 2018 Commonwealth Games, was born in Beaudesert and attended Beaudesert State High School. She is not related to golfer Jason Day, also born in Beaudesert.
- Jamal Fogarty, Gold Coast Titans and Canberra Raiders player, was born in Beaudesert.
- Andrew Gee, Queensland and Brisbane Broncos player, was born in Beaudesert.
- Mel Greig, an Australian radio and television personality, was born in Beaudesert.
- Rick Price, musician, was born in Beaudesert.
- Cecilia Smith, Aboriginal activist, born in Beaudesert

== See also ==
- Beaudesert Shire
- List of tramways in Queensland
