= John McDonald (art critic) =

Australian art critic and art historian (born 1961)

John McDonald is an Australian journalist and editor, publisher, art and film critic, art writer, art historian, curator, and lecturer, active since the early 1980s. McDonald's bibliography includes exhibition catalogues, monographs, edited volumes and substantial historical surveys. He has repeatedly moved between reviewing, curating, and editorial projects, as both commentator and a participant in discussion of Australian art both in his home country and in the United Kingdom. In addition he has presented on radio and television and as guest lecturer in art and design courses at the tertiary level, in Art History & Theory at the National Art School, Sydney in particular, and at galleries around Australia.

== Origins, education and early career ==
McDonald was born in 1961 in Cessnock, New South Wales. He studied English literature and philosophy at the University of Sydney, graduating in 1981. Subsequently, while living in London in the 1980s and into the early 1990s, he edited the 1993 anthology, Peter Fuller's Modern Painters, and contributed art criticism for The Guardian and The Sunday Telegraph as well as to journals including The Art Newspaper.

== Art critic ==
McDonald is best known for his long association since the age of 23 with The Sydney Morning Herald, the first period being from 1983 to 1989, in which he remarked that Aboriginal art was "Australia's most exciting, most imaginative and dynamic contribution to world culture", a position he continued to support. He left to live and work in Europe from 1989 until 1994. On return, at the end of the recession, he was able to say that "In recent years, I've been to art fairs in London, Paris and Madrid, but none has a venue to rival Melbourne. This architectural opulence is [a] fortunate ... location for the [fourth] ACAF Australian Contemporary Art Fair."

McDonald resumed writing at the SMH over 1994–98, then signed on as critic and feature writer in 2003 for the Australian Financial Review, leaving it to return to the SMH from 2005. Osborne notes that while most art critics were usually paid as casuals below Australian Journalists Association (AJA) rates, McDonald while on the SMH was an exception "reputed to earn a respectable professional income as an art critic, but even he remains a freelancer, paid on a per article basis." He provided a regular commentary on Australian art and the major art prizes. McDonald was the paper's most prominent art critic until his bitterly resented dismissal in 2024, when his colleague and competitor on The Australian Christopher Allen mourned that:

...the very role of the expert and independent reviewer seems to be in the process of disappearing in a post-critical consumer culture. The Sydney Morning Herald has recently sacked its veteran critic, John McDonald, with whom I worked long ago at the same publication. This is a disaster for the Herald's credibility and for the art world, and yet sadly not surprising considering the old Fairfax paper's slow decline under the management of Nine Entertainment...

From 2018–2020 McDonald wrote an art column for the Fairfax newspaper insert Good Weekend, issued with The Canberra Times, The Sydney Morning Herald and The Age in Saturday editions.

McDonald has been called "notoriously difficult-to-please", but treats artists he favours, even those he has not met, with respect and delicacy, for instance when dealing with the death of Bronwyn Oliver, but is undaunted by others' celebrity; he excoriates Germaine Greer's depiction of "Aboriginal artists as unwitting despoilers of their own cultural heritage" in which she "has painted a one-dimensional portrait and exhibited the paternalism she criticises in others". Martin Sharp admired his 'eloquence', and Brownbill reports him as saying "Airy statements of opinion are a waste of time. A critic has to make value judgments, but those judgments need to be supported by an argument." As Patricia Anderson characterises him, McDonald always speaks his mind in his "astringent" criticism:

With a sharp sense of the ridiculous and a taste for controversy, he took a razor blade to the pretensions of the remnants of the avant-garde and the young postmodernist art culture around him. He enjoyed the scrapes and the distemper, and he developed a reputation for mimicking his adversaries, not to mention friends, art dealers, bureaucrats and politicians.

Alongside McDonald's newspaper journalism he published reviews, essays and contribution pieces for such journals as Art and Australia from the late 1980s and into the 21st century, but rarely on well-trodden paths, treating with seriousness some artists, such as Ken Done or Patrick Hockey, whom others dismissed as 'decorative' or 'outré', promoting contemporary immigrant Chinese, and First Nations artists, and recalibrating the standing of others, the superiority of Nora Heysen over her father Hans, being an instance. Of Rupert Bunny he remarks that the painter was "was not a painter of timeless masterpieces, but a versatile professional, ever alert to the changing currents of art fashion". In another example, through his particular interest in the Archibald Prize, he was invited by Shen Jiawei to produce an essay for the catalogue of A Retrospective of Chinese Archibald Finalists exhibition, held at the China Cultural Centre, Castlereagh St. Sydney from 25 July to 27 August 2015, featuring 23 finalist portraits from sixteen Chinese-born painters who had been nominated as a finalist for the Archibald every year from 1990 to 2014. An expanded version was published in The Sydney Morning Herald. A rare agreement with other critics was the case of Aida Tomescu of whose 2009 major survey exhibition he expressed admiration for work he found "alive and convincing", in accord with Sasha Grishin's assessment that she is "one of the leading exponents of gestural abstraction". In Jeanette Hoorn's estimation however she places McDonald with Bernard Smith and Giles Auty as one who is "deeply worried about modernism and postmodernism and darkly mutter about a return to ‘tonal values’".

== Curator ==
=== National Gallery of Australia ===
Over 1999–2000, McDonald was invited by its director Brian Kennedy to apply for the curatorship of Australian art at the National Gallery of Australia, arriving in time to write the introduction to Assistant Curator Deborah Clark's exhibition The antipodeans : challenge and response in Australian art 1955-1965, held 27 November 1999 – 5 March 2000. His introduction portrays the Antipodeans as a group whose defence of figurative, humanist painting in their 1959 manifesto was historically understandable but ultimately overstated their fears about abstraction’s "emptying-out of humanistic values" and its turn toward "abstract decoration at the expense of recognisable signs and symbols". He acknowledges that such were genuine anxieties in a Cold War art world increasingly oriented toward American modernism, yet notes that their "strident and hysterical" and defensive rhetoric was "too cut-and-dried," risking an appearance of cultural isolationism. McDonald maintains that the tension they identified between tradition and avant-garde fashion has persisted and in retrospect he concludes that both the Antipodeans and their abstract opponents have been absorbed into the artistic canon, and have "taken on the status of classics.” Most significantly in his time at the gallery he produced the touring exhibition Federation: Art and Society 1901–2001 for the centenary of the Federation of the Australian Commonwealth. Writing at the time, Victoria Laurie remarked that his task was daunting against "wide-spread ignorance of our own history and too many choices about how to tell the story: As Chief Curator...his job has been to tell our story in pictures, but not by way of "a tedious progression" of art down the ages." Laurie quotes his assertion that; "It really is a look at art for the last 100 years with all the light and shade and contradictions, all the ups and downs. There's no one image that sums us up ... It's more a massive, crazy quilt—the Australian character chops and changes all over the place. But you can juxtapose images that make some strong and interesting points."

==== Controversy ====
Kennedy himself had only recently taken his position in 1997, moving from his role as assistant director at the National Gallery of Ireland and had encountered friction from the Australian art world, but McDonald's hiring compounded the controversy; his appointment being made after applications had officially closed aroused the jealousy of curators in other institutions; and his pronouncements as a critic had earned him enemies. Public protests—letters to newspapers and the gallery, and petitions—accused him, as Anderson notes, "of building his career on calculated populism, only made plausible by the ruthlessness he brought to his work as an art reviewer" and having "demonstrated an intolerant attitude to Australian art with strong ideological overtones".

As Peter Harris notes in his defence, these accusations were made by artists about whom he had written, such as Mike Parr, John Nixon, Susan Norrie and Ken Unsworth; also academic Brad Buckley; the former directors of the Museum of Contemporary Art, Bernice Murphy and Leon Paroissien; directors of publicly-funded art spaces, Jane Barney and Nick Tsoutas; and private gallery directors, including Susan Hampel and Anna Schwartz; and from Tim Bonyhady in Eureka Street.

Joan Kerr, writing in February 2000 in Art and Australia on 'icons' of Australian art remarks that influential newspaper critics "like Giles Auty, John McDonald" claim authority in defining the "iconic status of contemporary (white male) art", and "that the NGA jumps to repair grave omissions on their say-so. The lack of a gigantic William Robinson painting, for example, was apparently remedied at the NGA just as soon as McDonald took up the post of Head of Australian Art."

The furore was exacerbated by McDonald's disagreements with NGA director Brian Kennedy, and precipitated in his resignation in December 2000 and his accepting the inaugural editorship of the Australian Art Review and East-West Arts, and publisher-in-chief of East-West Editions.

McDonald published his exposée of the shortcomings of working in the government art institution in an article in Quadrant, an account of a dispiriting clash between artistic purpose and bureaucratic control. Expecting to undertake curatorial and intellectual work, he instead found himself trapped in what he calls Max Weber's "iron cage" of meetings, paperwork, and management rituals. He argues that the corporate jargon of cultural institutions; "teamwork", "accountability", and "access" masks hierarchy, poor morale, and intellectual stagnation, such that the NGA's leadership had become preoccupied with image, statistics, and managerial-speak at the expense of substance. Quoting Richard Sennett, he concludes that: "These problems have arisen from the failure to recognise—beyond all the rhetoric, all the mission statements and business plans—that exhibitions and collection development form the core business of the institution."

In turn, Gerard McManus, also in Quadrant, accused "McDonald, a man who built his reputation for exposing the infantilism of the Australian art world" of treachery in joining in the "assassination" of NGA director Kennedy, and laid the blame for McDonald's discontent with, and departure from, the Gallery at his own feet.

=== Newcontemporaries ===
At the end of August 2002 McDonald, with gallery manager Anna Grigson, opened his Newcontemporaries, a non-commercial gallery in the Queen Victoria Building (QVB), Sydney, a retail centre. Newcontemporaries, and the Quadrivium gallery (opened 1996, in the same building), were subsidised by Malaysian property investor group Ipoh which wanted a cultural component in the QVB's retail mix. McDonald told Joyce Morgan that "It's a chance to do the kind of things I would have liked to do at the National Gallery but was prevented from [doing] by various circumstances ... It allows a degree of freedom that is not possible in publicly funded spaces ... and the possibility of doing shows that wouldn't be considered by commercial galleries." From the start, in its position amongst upmarket boutiques, artworks and craftworks were shown together including in that first show, Kylie Banyard's and Juliana Bartulin's paintings, Mark O'Ryan's aluminium furniture, and Dave Teer's and Abby Parkes's sculpture beside Ryuhei Nadatani's works in glass, Ruth McMillan ceramics and Narelle Jordan's textiles. Immigrant Chinese artists were exhiibited and supported in McDonald's contemporaneous reviews.

Among the diverse, and usually young and emerging, artists the gallery showed were Joe Furlonger (October–November 2002), Sydney or the Bush (November 2002 – February 2003), John Robinson (February–March 2003) Conversations and portraits (2003), a zodiac–themed show curated by astrologist Mystic Medusa (May 2003), and an exhibition devoted to five artists of the New England town of Walcha (June 2003), a town he holds up in 2006 as an exemplary case study in public sculpture. Newcontemporaries also exhibited Cathy Blanchflower, Marion Borgelt, Jacki Fleet, Ildiko Kovacs, Dorothy Napangardi, Gloria Petyarre, Angelina Pwerle, Aida Tomescu and Savanhdary Vongpoothorn together (August 2003), the collaborating twins Catherine and Jennifer Strutt (September 2003), showed Ian Bettinson, Illos – The Art of Contemporary Illustration, and Zhao Bandi in 2004, and the historical exposition No Ordinary Man: Sydney's Quong Tart, in collaboration with the Quong Tart Centenary Commemoration Committee.

Consulted in his role at Newcontemporaries, McDonald judged that Christie's estimated auction price of $800,000 to $1.2 million for Brett Whiteley's 1987 Arkie Under the Shower did not reflect the painting's lesser value compared to the artist's 1960s bathroom series, and that the estimate was "just an example of the hype being lavished on a very late and undistinguished painting by Brett Whiteley. If you look at the early pictures they have a tremendous amount of vigorous drawing in them and they are very energetic and very inventive pictures. This one has a very simple shape ... with a gimmicky splatter of paint across the top."

Newcontemporaries and its neighbour Quadrivium closed in August 2004 when the new owners, the Government of Singapore Investment Corporation, sought increased revenue from rents.

== Art historian ==
A dictum McDonald frequently repeats is that "an artist only becomes most fully himself [or herself], by taking on the very best artists of the past, learning from their example and adapting those lessons for one's own purposes." His Art of Australia (2008) discovers nuanced understandings of the development of approaches to Australian landscape painting. National Art School lecturer Molly Duggins credits it, as founded on Federation: Art and Society the one exhibition he curated while at the NGA, with analysis of artists previously overlooked in Bernard Smith's and Robert Hughes' accounts, particularly Eugene von Guérard, and S.T. Gill, and Arthur Loureiro. Of these artists' biographies McDonald develops a narrative of Australia as a node in a network of global artistic travel and influence. Duggins remarks that "McDonald cites an over-emphasis on the rise of the plein-air painting movement in Australia as the major impetus behind previously skewed accounts of colonial art, and a driving theme behind his survey is the desire to disprove the myth of the Heidelberg School as the first painters to actually 'see' the Australian landscape, while also recognising the overwhelming importance of the movement"

Sasha Grishin, in his 2008 review of the book, regards McDonald's methodology as traditional; "essentially a string of biographies arranged in chronological order, with occasional thematic digressions". He notes the restriction to painting, with architecture and the applied arts "almost ignored, except for an isolated consideration of Lucien Henry," and "sculpture is not systematically discussed, except for short excursions into the work of Charles Summers and Bertram Mackenna", but Grishin welcomes "the snappy characterisations and value judgments" concluding that McDonald's "wit, personal insights and lively intellect make this a narrative that is a pleasure to read".

In her 2009 Quadrant review Patricia Anderson, who like him became an editor of Australian Art Review, offers a sympathetic assessment of John McDonald's dual career as a successful long-distance transition from critic to historian with Art of Australia. She treats his notoriety as an art critic as evidence of intellectual independence rather than hostility and implicitly defends him against the negativity of the National Gallery episode by emphasising the seriousness and scholarly range of his history, and his diligence, and democratic and revisionist approaches and his inclusive approach that extends Australian art's beginnings to Aboriginal rock art. His "trademark astringency" she sees as enlivening rather than undermining the scholarship, particularly in his attention to lesser-known artists and art forms—murals, miniatures, Aboriginal works—and his interlocking biographical method which she says gives the book its strength and contributes to the evolving narrative of Australian art writing, as opposed to its reception by more academic or adversarial commentators such as Chris McAuliffe, whose "stiff-necked" review she critiques for missing McDonald's achievement. She concludes:

We can probably anticipate some real fireworks from McDonald as he approaches his own generation of artists in his third and final volume. One has only to recall the scuffles between McDonald and artists Mike Parr and John Nixon, which ignited like a magnesium taper and provided much of the bright flare in the art world in the latter part of the 1980s and early 1990s.

== Recent contributions ==
Since the 2024 termination of his contract at The Sydney Morning Herald, McDonald continues his reviews, commentary and analysis, as at 2025, on several platforms, including a Substack newsletter, Everything the artworld doesn't want you to know and newspapers, including his 2011 return as weekly film reviewer on the Australian Financial Review, and on The Nightly and The Australian.

== Selected book publications ==
- Fuller, Peter; McDonald, John (1993). McDonald, John (ed.). Peter Fuller's modern painters reflections on British art. London: Methuen. ISBN 978-0-413-67460-9.
- Smart, Jeffrey; McDonald, John (1990). Jeffrey Smart – paintings of the '70s and '80s. Roseville, NSW: Craftsman House. ISBN 978-976-8097-01-9.
- Purhonen, Ari; McDonald, John; Delaruelle, Jacques; Allen, Christopher (1992). Ari Purhonen. Oliver Freeman Editions. ISBN 978-1-875613-01-4.
- Dupain, Rex; McDonald, John (1998). Bondi to Broken Hill. Angus & Robertson.
- Whisson, Ken; McDonald, John, eds. (1999). Ken Whisson Paintings 1947–1999: With an introduction by John McDonald and a selection of writings and talks by the artist from 1969 until now. Niagara Publishing. ISBN 978-0-908298-71-6.
- McDonald, John; National Gallery of Australia, eds. (2000). Federation: Australian art and society 1901–2001; [Exhibition Federation: Australian Art and Society 1901–2001, held at the National Gallery of Australia, 8 December 2000 – 11 February 2001 ...; Queen Victoria Museum and Art Gallery, Launceston, Tasmania, 10 May – 7 July 2002]. Canberra: National Gallery of Australia [u.a.] ISBN 978-0-642-54123-9.
- Russell, John Peter; McDonald, John (2001). John Peter Russell (1858–1930): November 27 – December 21, 2001. Rex Irwin Art Dealer.
- Dupain, Rex; McDonald, John (2002). Rex Dupain : Australian images. New Holland Publishers. ISBN 978-1-86436-770-6.
- Lynton, Norbert; Warren, Guy; McDonald, John (2003). Searching for Gaia: the art of Guy Warren. South Yarra, Vic: Macmillan. ISBN 978-1-876832-37-7.
- McDonald, John (2004). Peter Neilson: out and about on the dark morning streets : Melbourne painting and sculpture. Melbourne: Australian Galleries.
- Hoyland, John; McDonald, John; Michael Carr Art Dealer; Nevill Keating Pictures (Firm) (2006). John Hoyland. Michael Carr Art Dealer.
- Lloyd, R. Ian; Woldendorp, Yolanta; Moore, Wendy; McDonald, John (2007). Studio : Australian painters on the nature of creativity (1st ed.). R. Ian Lloyd Productions. ISBN 978-981-05-7466-6.
- McDonald, John, ed. (2008). The Art of Australia. South Yarra: Macmillan Art Publishing. ISBN 978-1-4050-3869-0.
- Kentridge, William; McDonald, John (2008). William Kentridge: telegrams from the nose: films, sculpture, drawings, tapestry, etchings. Annandale Galleries. ISBN 978-1-4276-2265-5.
- Rish, Adam; McDonald, John (2020). Misanthropology : the world art of Adam Rish /Adam Rish, John McDonald. RYZ Press. ISBN 978-1-64007-231-2.
