= Cecile de Wentworth =

American painter (1853–1933)

- Born: Cecilia Smith; 1853; New York City
- Died: August 28, 1933 (aged 79–80); Nice, France
- Other names: Cecile Smith, Mrs. Josiah Winslow Wentworth, Cecile Wentworth, Cecilia E. Wentworth
- Occupation: Artist
- Spouse: Josiah Wentworth

Cecile de Wentworth (1853 – 28 August 1933) was an American portrait artist who resided in France and painted influential figures.

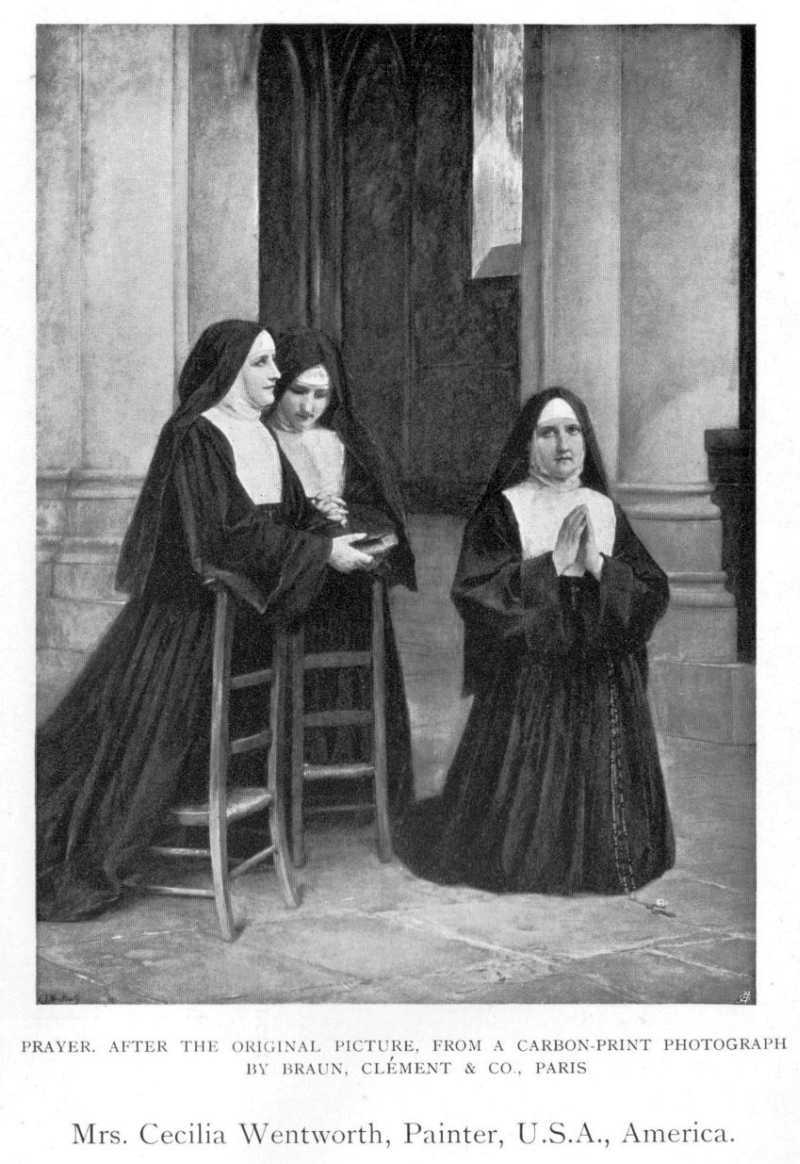
Cecile Smith de Wentworth - Prayer

== Biography ==
Cecilia Smith (later Cecile de Wentworth) was born in 1853 to a prominent family in New York City. She received the bulk of her early education in covenant schools. In 1886, she began studying painting under Alexandre Cabanel and Édouard Detaille at the École des Beaux-Arts in Paris, France. They became the prominent influences on her portrait style

She married Josiah Wentworth within several years of moving to Paris. In 1889, she exhibited at the Paris Salon as Mme. C. E. Wentworth, and continued to exhibit there until 1920. She was awarded a bronze medal in 1890 and honorable mention in the Universal Exhibition in 1891. She was also awarded medals after exhibiting in Lyon and Turin and notably won the 1st gold medal at the National Exhibition in Tours.

Mrs. Wentworth remained an American citizen despite living most of her life in France. She exhibited her work Prayer at The Woman's Building at the 1893 World's Columbian Exposition in Chicago, Illinois.

In 1894, she was appointed Officer de Academie and Officer de Instruction in Paris. In 1900, she received one of France's highest honors: Chevalier de Legion (or Chevalier of the Legion of Honor).

She was commissioned to paint portraits of some of the most notable people of her era, including President Theodore Roosevelt, William Howard Taft, Archbishop Corigan and Queen Alexandria of England (commissioned by the king of Spain).

Her portrait of Pope Leo XIII won a bronze medal at the 1900 Exposition Universelle in Paris. This led to the pope bestowing her with the title of Grand Commander of the Order of the Holy Sepulchre and creating a papal Marchesa for her. Her portrait was later hung in the Vatican Museum, where it still hangs today

In 1918, she painted a life-size portrait of General John J. Pershing standing confidently against a backdrop of devastated European scenery. The portrait currently hangs at the Museum of French History in Versailles

Her husband died in 1931, leaving her impoverished. She died on 28 August 1933 in Nice, France. The American Embassy in Paris paid for her funeral expenses

Cecile de Wentworth's works were acquired by the Metropolitan Museum of Art in New York, the Corcoran Gallery of Art in Washington D.C., and other leasing Museums. She is one of the few female artists whose paintings have been purchased by the Musée du Luxembourg
