= Cecilia Smith (activist) =

Cecilia Smith (née Hatton; 24 March 1911 – 23 December 1980) was an Australian Aboriginal activist. Born in Beaudesert, Queensland, she was originally a domestic worker before moving to Fortitude Valley, Queensland, where she opened an open house residence. She later served as a member of the Federal Council for the Advancement of Aborigines and Torres Strait Islanders, including three years as honorary secretary in the Queensland chapter. She later campaigned on the "yes" side in the 1967 Aboriginal referendum. She died of kidney failure after surgery in Brisbane.

== Early life ==
Cecilia Hatton was born on 24 March 1911 in Beaudesert, Queensland, Australia, the second of five children to labourer William "Pompey" Hatten and his second wife Dolly née Tate. Both her parents were Aboriginal. She attended a local school in Beaudesert and was confirmed at the Church of England. At 18 she gave birth to Charles, the son of Charles Banks, however they never married. She married farm labourer Ernest Smith on 8 August 1932 at Christ Church in Boonah. The couple separated in 1943 and she relocated to Fortitude Valley in Brisbane with their four children.

== Career ==
Smith had three sons that survived her, but her only daughter Betty died in the 1950s. Smith was known to accommodate strangers in her house and in the 1960s she began cooking meals outside for the community. She became a member of the Queensland Council for the Advancement of Aborigines and Torres Strait Islanders and was its honorary secretary from 1972 to 1975. She sat on the association's Federal Council and was also an executive member of its women's council. At the fourth national conference of Aboriginal and Islander women in Melbourne in 1974, Smith was the association's representative. She was an outspoken supporter of voting "Yes" during the 1967 Aboriginal referendum.

== Death ==
On 23 December 1980, Smith died of kidney failure after undergoing abdominal surgery at the Princess Alexandra Hospital in Brisbane.
