= Edward Roper (artist) =

Canadian artist (1833-1891)

- Born: 1833; Kent, England
- Died: 1909; England
- Known for: painter, illustrator, writer, publisher

Edward Roper (1833 – 1909) was a painter, illustrator, printmaker, writer, publisher, and naturalist.

== Career ==
Roper was born in Kent, England and emigrated with his family to Canada in 1844. He is said to have studied art in Paris. His practice was to sketch from life in graphite or watercolour, and then to complete paintings based on his sketches. He also collected specimens of flora and fauna.

From 1853 till 1857, he lived in Australia - several works made in Australia are dated 1857 (some are in Dixson Galleries, State Library of New South Wales, Sydney, NSW). He travelled to England in 1857. In 1858, he returned to Canada with his newlywed wife.

In Canada, he served as a printer in Hamilton, Ontario, working for the earlier, Hamilton-based version of the Canadian Illustrated News (1862‒1864). In 1865 he went back to England, and then spent three years in Australia from 1870‒1873 where he started the 'Graphotyping Engraving Company’.

He claimed Canada had been his home since he went there with his family and he had lived there "nearly ever since" in a book published by the Graphotyping Company - and presented to the Deptford Emigration Society on 8 February 1870, What Emigration Really Is, By a Resident in Canada and Australia with Illustrations by the Author (London 1870). From 1870 to 1871, he took a voyage round the world in the ship Newcastle, and there is an album of this title containing photographs of Australian scenes (Mitchell Library, State Library of New South Wales, Sydney, NSW). Around 1873, he did 'Graphotype’ cartoons in the Graphic News of Australasia.

When his business failed, he made his home in England for the rest of his life as an artist and writer. However, he maintained his Canadian connections with his family, visiting Canada in 1878 and in the 1880s. His Portage Below Kakabeka Falls, Kaministiquia River, Lake Superior (Peter Winkworth Collection of Canadiana. Library and Archives Canada, e000996335) is dated 1878.

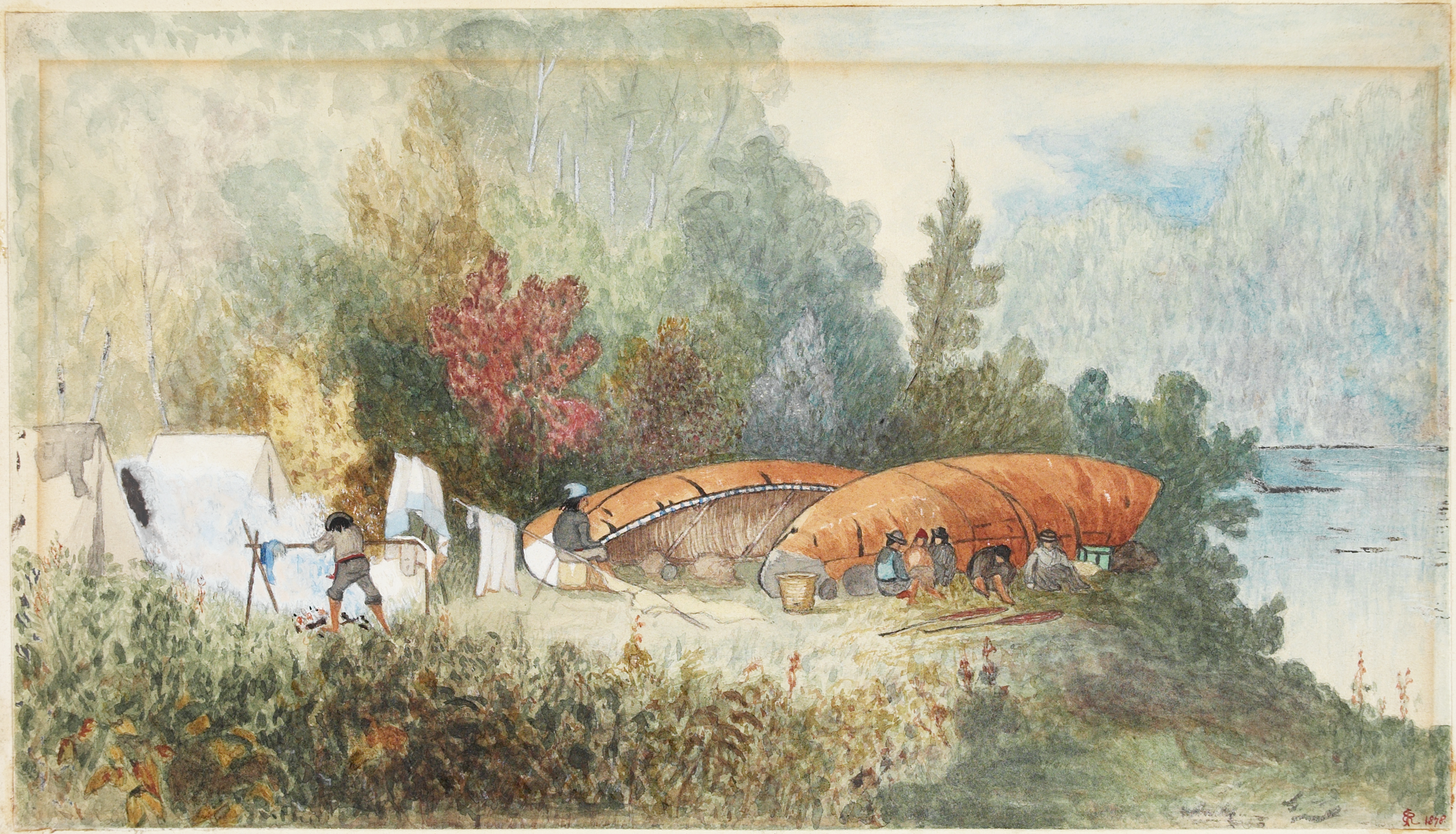
"Portage Below Kakabeka Falls, Kaministiquia River, Lake Superior" by Edward Roper « Portage sous les chutes Kakabeka de la rivière Kaministiquia, lac Supérieur » par Edward Roper (42900134495)

He published several illustrated accounts about different parts of the country, including Muskoka (1883) (believed to be one of the first accounts of the area) and Anticosti Island (1889). The most important of these works was Roper's account of his cross-country journey on the CPR in 1887, By Track and Trail: a journey through Canada; illustrated with his own sketches.

In England, he participated in the important Burlington Gallery Colonial and Indian Exhibition in 1886, exhibiting 49 or 50 oil and watercolour works in the Australian section of the show. He seems to have produced replicas of his work for many years so that many of the Australian subjects were from an earlier trip to Australia. Roper also organized another major exhibition of colonial pictures in 1889, and lectured widely about colonial life. He was elected a member of the Royal Geographical Society in 1889 where he was recorded as an artist living in Staplehurst, Kent. He remained a member until 1902, living at Bexhill-on-Sea in 1898, then at Lewes. He died in 1909.

== Record sale prices ==
At the Cowley Abbott Auction Artwork from an Important Private Collection - Part II, June 8, 2023, A Northwest Coast Indian Village, circa 1887, oil and watercolour on paper laid on board, 12.5 x 20.5 ins ( 31.8 x 52.1 cms ), Auction Estimate: $10,000.00 - $15,000.00, realized a price of $33,600.00
