= Nindooinbah Homestead =

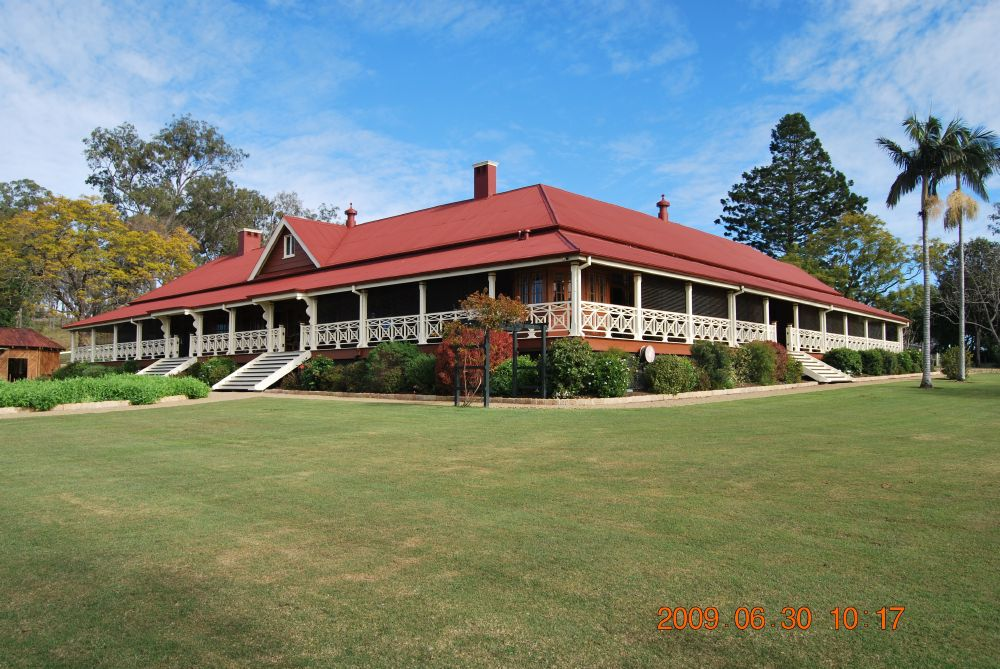
- Nindooinbah Homestead, 2009

- Location within Queensland Location within Australia
- 28.0252°S 153.0514°E
- Location: Nindooinbah Connection Road, Nindooinbah, Scenic Rim Region, Queensland, Australia

History
- Design period: 1840s - 1860s (mid-19th century)
- Built: c. 1858 - 1907

Queensland Heritage Register
- Official name: Nindooinbah Homestead, Nindooinbah House
- Type: state heritage (landscape, built)
- Designated: 21 October 1992
- Reference no.: 600027
- Significant period: 1850s-1860s (historical); 1850s, 1900s (fabric)
- Significant components: garden - ornamental/flower, yards - livestock, pavilion, pond/s - garden, residential accommodation - manager's house/quarters, decorative finishes, chimney/chimney stack, residential accommodation - main house, butcher's shop / killing shed / slaughter house (pastoral), meat house, objects (movable) - residential, shearing shed/woolshed, objects (movable) - pastoralism, gatehouse, garden/grounds, tennis court, shed - storage

Nindooinbah Homestead is a heritage-listed homestead at Nindooinbah Connection Road, Nindooinbah, Scenic Rim Region, Queensland, Australia. It was built from c. 1858 to 1907. It is also known as Nindooinbah House. It was added to the Queensland Heritage Register on 21 October 1992.

== History ==
The first stage of this one-storeyed timber house was L-shaped and built about 1860. After extensions by Robin Dods in 1906–7 the house was E-shaped. The homestead included a woolshed, stables, quarters and other out buildings and yards.

In 1842 Paul and Clement Lawless held the depasturing license for the Nindooinbah pastoral run. They sold it to Alfred William Compigne in 1847 when the run was about 16 square miles (41.44 square kilometres) and carried over 4,000 sheep.

In 1858 Compigne purchased, by pre-emptive right, 640 acres (260 ha). He used his lease holdings and freehold land to raise large mortgages and with some security of tenure, it is probable that the L-shaped homestead and outbuildings were constructed about this period.

Compigne was a member of the first legislative council and at the time of his death in 1909 was the last remaining original member of the council.

In 1862 Robert Towns held the mortgage for Nindooinbah and in 1867 he foreclosed on Compigne and soon after sold Nindooinbah to William Duckett White whose son Ernest was living on the property. At this stage the house was valued at £2,000 and there was £1,000 of improvements.

In 1877, 12,000 acres (4,900 ha) was resumed from the Nooininbah and Kerrylarabah pastoral runs and offered for selection on 17 April 1877.

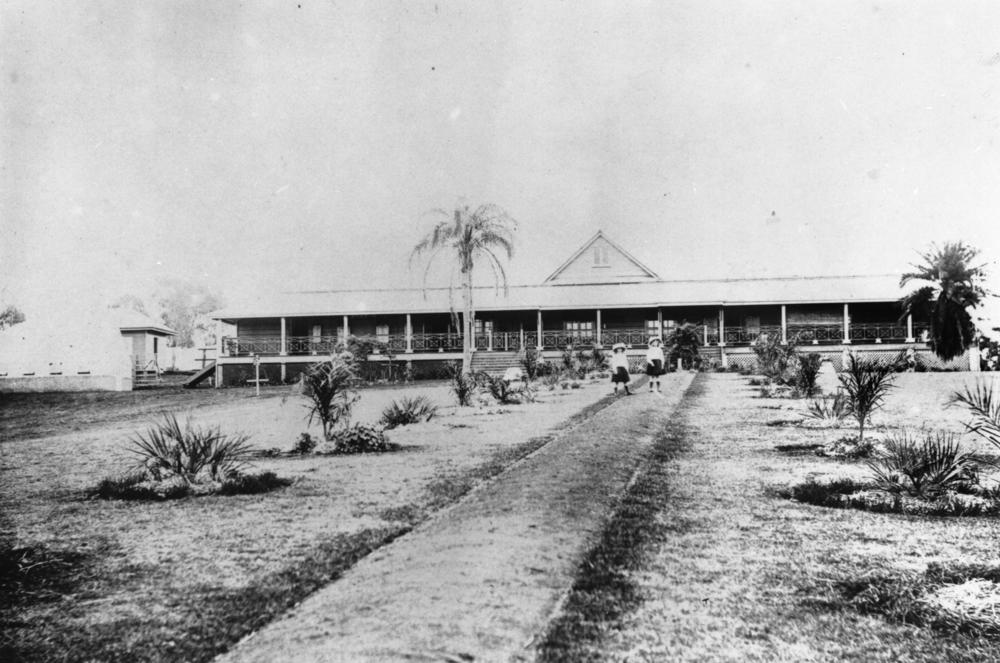
Nindooinbah Homestead, circa 1908

In 1901 William Collins, son of John Collins of the Mundoolun pastoral station, renewed his Nindooinbah lease. William and his bride honeymooned in Japan and on their return took up residence at Nindooinbah, though the house was in a very dilapidated state. Collins purchased the property, in 1906, and employed the eminent Brisbane architect, Robin Dods, to extend the house. His alteration were sympathetic to the original house, he changed the French doors and added an en-suite to the master bedroom but altered little else. In 1918 the entrance porch was extended.

The detached kitchen was moved about 1906 and became the gate house. Adjacent to the house are bush houses and fernery. A bamboo bush house was demolished in the 1950s though the irrigation system that feeds water from the laundry to it remains. A play house built in the 1950s has been adapted for use as a garage.

In the 1980s Margaret (a Collins descendant) and her husband the artist Patrick Hockey settled in and restored the homestead and grounds. The house was repainted externally and much of the Edwardian garden designed by Dods replanted. Hockey created his separate studio building in a vernacular Australian style and in a man-made lagoon designed a tea house inspired by the Willow Pattern. In the homestead Hockey displayed his work, and on the property fattened the cattle from his own Queensland estate. The gardens include a grotto, tennis court, and garden sheds.

Other buildings on site but beyond the homes enclosing fence includes an artists studio and flag pole, the managers house, garages, men's quarters, woolshed, cattle yards and remains of the stables, butchers shop, cold-room and icemaking room.

The woolshed was built as a permanent structure by 1857. It probably included shearers quarters and a dining room. From about 1863, the weather and other factors led most of the local squatters to utilise their runs for depasturing cattle rather than sheep, hence the woolshed has been used as men's quarters and storage for many years.

Of the original local squatter homesteads only Nindooinbah and Mundoolun remain and both have been and remain the homes of the Collins family or their descendants. The woolshed is probably one of the oldest in Queensland and its quality and intactness make it very rare.

== Description ==
Nindooinbah house, located in extensive gardens on a rural property, has distant views to the southeast across a lagoon and valley towards the surrounding hills. Buildings and structures related to the pastoral activities of the property are located to the northwest of the house.

A single-storeyed timber construction set on low timber stumps, the house is clad in wide chamferboards and has painted corrugated iron roofs. It has an E-shaped plan consisting of three rectangular wings around a northwest courtyard and a central entry porch. A timber pergola leads to the semi-enclosed entry porch which adjoins the verandah. Most rooms are accessed from the continuous verandah through wide French doors. The original L-shaped building now forms the eastern corner of the house and contains the main bedroom and attached bathroom, drawing room, smaller bedrooms and the "telephone" room, once the original dining room. The 1906 addition copies many of the details of the original house including balustrading and external wall cladding.

The northeast wing contains bedrooms and bathrooms. The addition is clearly separated from the original house by a corridor that links the courtyard verandah with the northeast verandah. The southeast wing, facing the garden and the view, houses the original drawing room and dining room and the new dining room, guest room and toilets. The Dods' designed dining room, adjacent to the 1858 building, has features not found elsewhere in the house; silky oak panelling, a vaulted ornamental plaster ceiling, bay windows protruding onto the verandah and other decorative details including an inscription over the fireplace. The guest room, next to the dining room, has original carpets, wallpapers, fabrics and furniture made from a bunya pine felled to make way for the extension. The south west wing, narrower than the other two wings with a verandah only on the courtyard side, contains the kitchen, ancillary rooms and servants quarters. A bedroom has been built into the northern corner of the verandah.

The roof of the house, hipped at the eastern and southern corners, is terminated by a double gable on the northern corner and a single gable on the western corner. The gables are decorated with oval shaped ventilation panels. Three brick chimney stacks protrude above the roof.

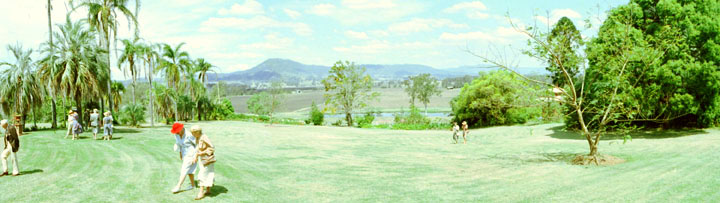
Gardens of Nindooinbah House, 1939

The large gardens and sweeping lawns that surround the house, based on the original planting schemes, are a mixture of a formal and picturesque layout. Avenues of palms mark paths to the house and specimen trees such as figs and bunya pines frame distant views. Formal flower beds are planted close to the house on the southeast and northwest sides. The garden contains a tennis court, fish pond and various pavilions. These include recent additions of a studio on the knoll in front of the house, once a cottage attached to the managers house, a tea house built over a new pond to the south of the house and a new fernery replacing a demolished bush house near the pond. The kitchen gardens, greenhouse, laundry and water tanks are on the southwest side of the house adjacent to the service wing. The boundaries of the garden are marked by a timber fence and elaborate timber gateways that show the influence of the fashionable taste for chinoiserie.

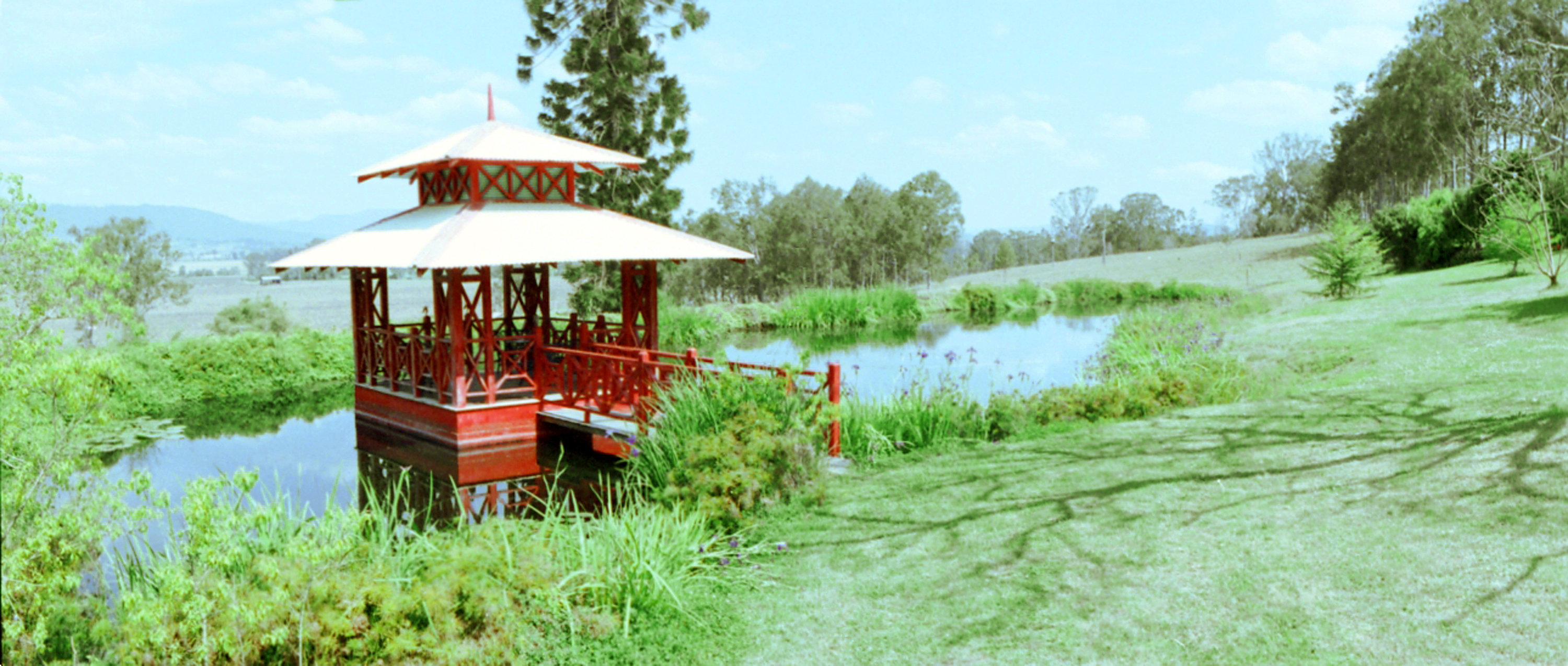
Gardens, 1989

Buildings related to the pastoral and agricultural activities of the property are located outside the formal gardens. These include a single-storeyed timber manager's house, storage sheds, an old timber wool shed, the remains of a stable and butchers shop and associated machinery and timber cattle and horse yards. A residence located beside the entry to the property is a single-storeyed weatherboard building with enclosed verandahs on three sides.

The wool shed is a single-storeyed building, clad in weatherboards and set on timber stumps. The large hipped roofed central space or nave has attached skillion roofed wings on three sides. Beneath the corrugated iron roof are remains of the earlier shingled roof. In the northwest part of the building are remnants of the original slatted timber floor. Most of the space under the skillions has been converted into bedrooms and a dining room lined with tongue-in-groove boards. The northern end of the building has subsided and parts of the fabric are in poor condition.

The house, especially the fragile interiors and furnishings are remarkably intact. The garden is well maintained. Outbuildings related to the activities of the property continue to be used and maintained.

== Heritage listing ==
Nindooinbah Homestead was listed on the Queensland Heritage Register on 21 October 1992 having satisfied the following criteria.

The place is important in demonstrating the evolution or pattern of Queensland's history.

Nindooinbah House is an example of a homestead as country residence displaying the changing affluent lifestyle and tastes of the squattocracy.

The place demonstrates rare, uncommon or endangered aspects of Queensland's cultural heritage.

Nindooinbah House is an example of rare surviving fabric of an 1850s squatter dwelling and woolshed.

The place is important in demonstrating the principal characteristics of a particular class of cultural places.

The sheds, out buildings and other remains provide evidence of the continuing pastoral and agricultural activities of the property.

The place is important because of its aesthetic significance.

Nindooinbah House is significant for the superbly maintained gardens, which are an accomplished design, providing an appropriate setting for the house in the landscape.

The place is important in demonstrating a high degree of creative or technical achievement at a particular period.

Adding to the significance of Nindooinbah House is the intactness of the interior, including furniture and fittings, and the high quality of the materials, craftsmanship and detailing of the house.

The place has a strong or special association with a particular community or cultural group for social, cultural or spiritual reasons.

The property has associations with squatters AW Compigne, R Towns, WD and E White and the Collins family.

The place has a special association with the life or work of a particular person, group or organisation of importance in Queensland's history.

It is an important example of the work of the architect RS Dods, which demonstrates his skill in adapting an older building.
