= Tabooba, Queensland =

Tabooba
- Suburb
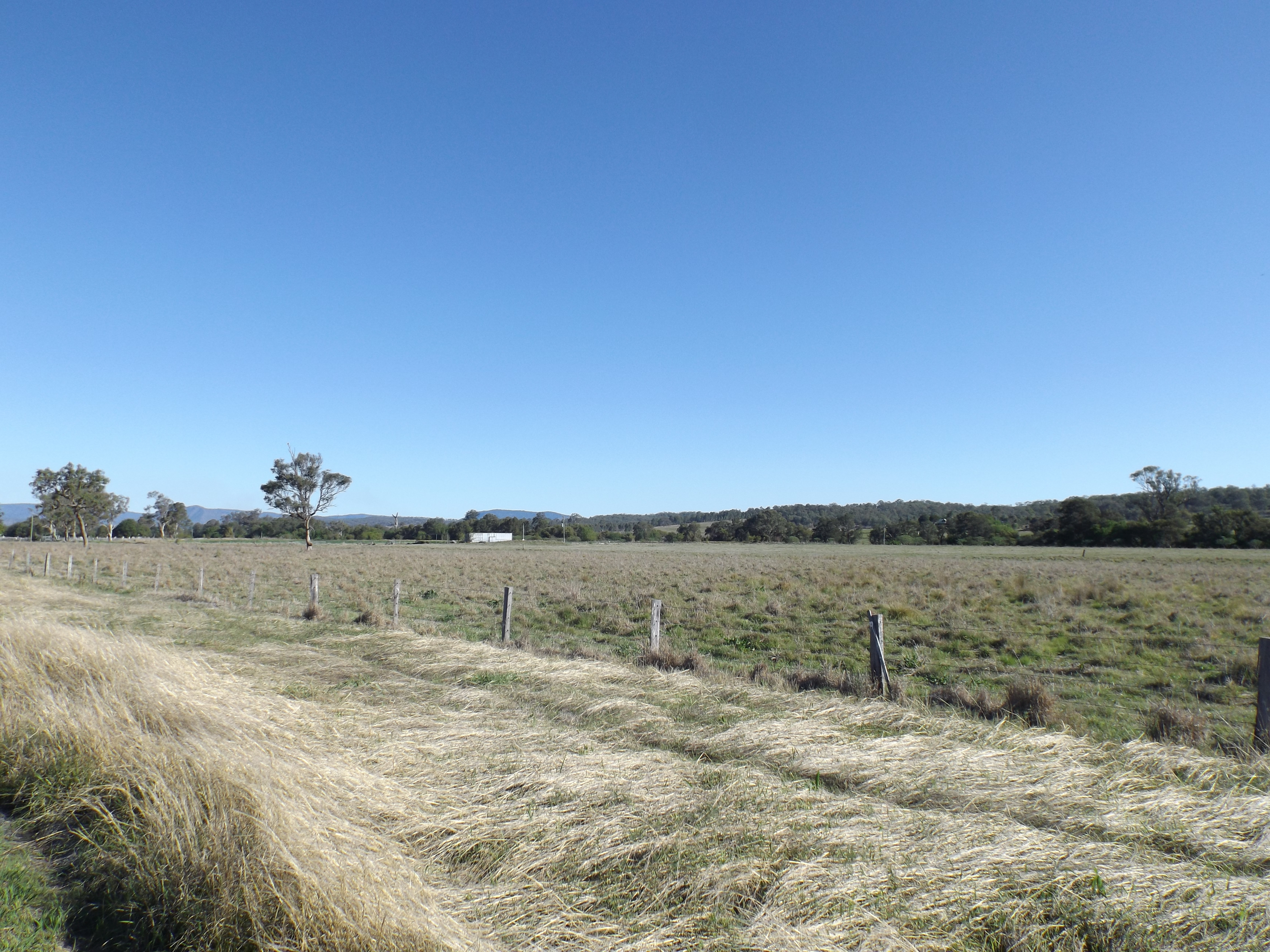
- Paddocks along Christmas Creek Road, 2014

- Interactive map of Tabooba
- Coordinates: 28.1358°S 152.9669°E
- Country: Australia
- State: Queensland
- LGA: Scenic Rim Region
- Location: 20.6 km (12.8 mi) S of Beaudesert; 85.3 km (53.0 mi) WSW of Surfers Paradise; 89.9 km (55.9 mi) S of Brisbane CBD

Government
  - State electorate: Scenic Rim
  - Federal division: Wright

Area
  - Total: 24.1 km^{2} (9.3 sq mi)

Population
  - Total: 57 (2021 census)
  - Density: 2.365/km^{2} (6.13/sq mi)
- Time zone: UTC+10:00 (AEST)
- Postcode: 4285
Suburbs around Tabooba
Tamrookum	Laravale	Kerry
Tamrookum	Tabooba	Kerry
Innisplain	Oaky Creek	Christmas Creek

Tabooba is a rural locality in the Scenic Rim Region, Queensland, Australia. In the 2021 census, Tabooba had a population of 57 people.

== Geography ==
Tabooba is located at the confluence of Christmas Creek and Logan River. Logan River marks the western boundary. In the east the locality reaches elevations greater than 400 m above sea level, along Jinbroken Range.

== History ==
The Beaudesert Shire Tramway passed through Tabooba and opened in 1902. The station was known as Tabooba Junction. Here the line split with one branch reaching Rathdowney and the other to Lamington.

Tabooba State School opened on 24 July 1911. It closed on 24 August 1942. It was on a 1-acre (0.40 ha) site on the southern corner of Christmas Creek Road and Tramway Road (approx 28.13474°S 152.96172°E).

== Demographics ==
In the 2016 census, Tabooba had a population of 72 people.

In the 2021 census, Tabooba had a population of 57 people.

== Education ==
There are no schools in Tabooba. The nearest government primary schools are Tamrookum State School in neighbouring Tamrookum to the north-west, Darlington State School in Darlington to the south-east, and Hillview State School in Hillview to the south. The nearest government secondary school is Beaudesert State High School in Beaudesert to the north. There are also some non-government schools in Beaudesert.

== See also ==
- List of tramways in Queensland
