= Cryna, Queensland =

Cryna
- Suburb
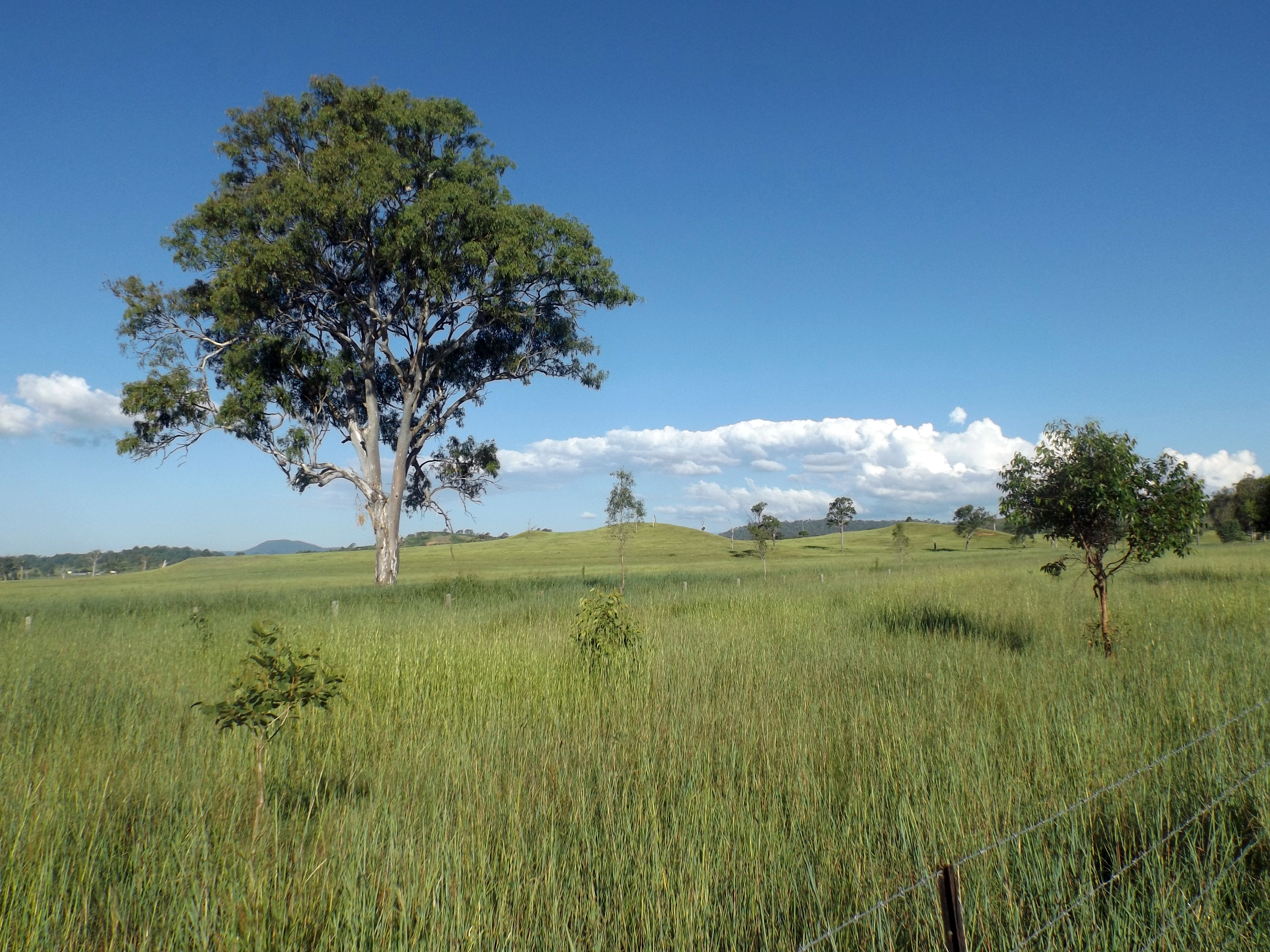
- Fields, Markwell Creek Road, 2016

- Interactive map of Cryna
- Coordinates: 28.0405°S 152.9863°E
- Country: Australia
- State: Queensland
- LGA: Scenic Rim Region
- Location: 4.7 km (2.9 mi) S of Beaudesert; 74.2 km (46.1 mi) S of Brisbane CBD

Government
  - State electorate: Scenic Rim
  - Federal division: Wright

Area
  - Total: 22.9 km^{2} (8.8 sq mi)

Population
  - Total: 134 (2021 census)
  - Density: 5.85/km^{2} (15.16/sq mi)
- Time zone: UTC+10:00 (AEST)
- Postcode: 4285
Suburbs around Cryna
Beaudesert	Beaudesert	Beaudesert
Josephville	Cryna	Nindooinbah
Laravale	Laravale	Kerry

Cryna is a rural locality in the Scenic Rim Region, Queensland, Australia. In the 2021 census, Cryna had a population of 134 people.

== Geography ==
Part of the western border is marked by the Mount Lindesay Highway. Part of the northern boundary follow Spring Creek. The main land use in the area is agriculture. Parts of the central area are elevated along a ridge marking the northern extent of Jinbroken Range.

== History ==
The location name comes from the 1870s agricultural and grazing property of Charles Overend Garbutt (1850–1905). Garbutt came from Marton Hall, Middlesbrough-on-Tees, Yorkshire, England. The 3,400 acres (1,400 hectares) Spring Creek holdings went to auction in December 1877 as Garbutt was moving from the district. It was then purchased by Harry and William Webb until 1882, before being purchased by June 1896 by the Queensland Government under the Agricultural Lands Purchase Act 1894 (and the later Closer Settlement Act 1906) where the property was subdivided into agricultural blocks.

Cryna Provisional School opened on 30 April 1907. On 1 January 1909 it became Cryna State School. It closed in 1935.

The Beaudesert Shire Tramway passed through the area but did not have a station. The closest station was at Josephville or the terminus in Beaudesert.

== Demographics ==
In the 2016 census, Cryna had a population of 113 people. The locality contains 51 households, in which 52.6% of the population are males and 47.4% of the population are females with a median age of 42, 4 years above the national average. The average weekly household income is $1,281, $157 below the national average. 0.0% of Cryna's population is either of Aborigional or Torres Strait Islander descent. 56.0% of the population aged 15 or over is either registered or de facto married, while 44.0% of the population is not married. 24.1% of the population is currently attending some form of a compulsory education. The most common nominated ancestries were English (37.1%), Australian (30.5%) and Irish (14.6%), while the most common country of birth was Australia (80.7%), and the most commonly spoken language at home was English (100.0%). The most common nominated religions were Catholic (27.4%), No religion (27.4%) and Anglican (15.1%). The most common occupation was a manager (21.8%) and the majority/plurality of residents worked 40 or more hours per week (46.4%).

In the 2021 census, Cryna had a population of 134 people.

== Education ==
There are no schools in Cryna. The nearest government primary schools are Beaudesert State School in neighbouring Beaudesert to the north and Tamrookum State School in Tamrookum to the south-west. The nearest government secondary school is Beaudesert State High School, also in Beaudesert. There are also non-government schools in Beaudesert.
