= Cainbable, Queensland =

Cainbable
- Suburb
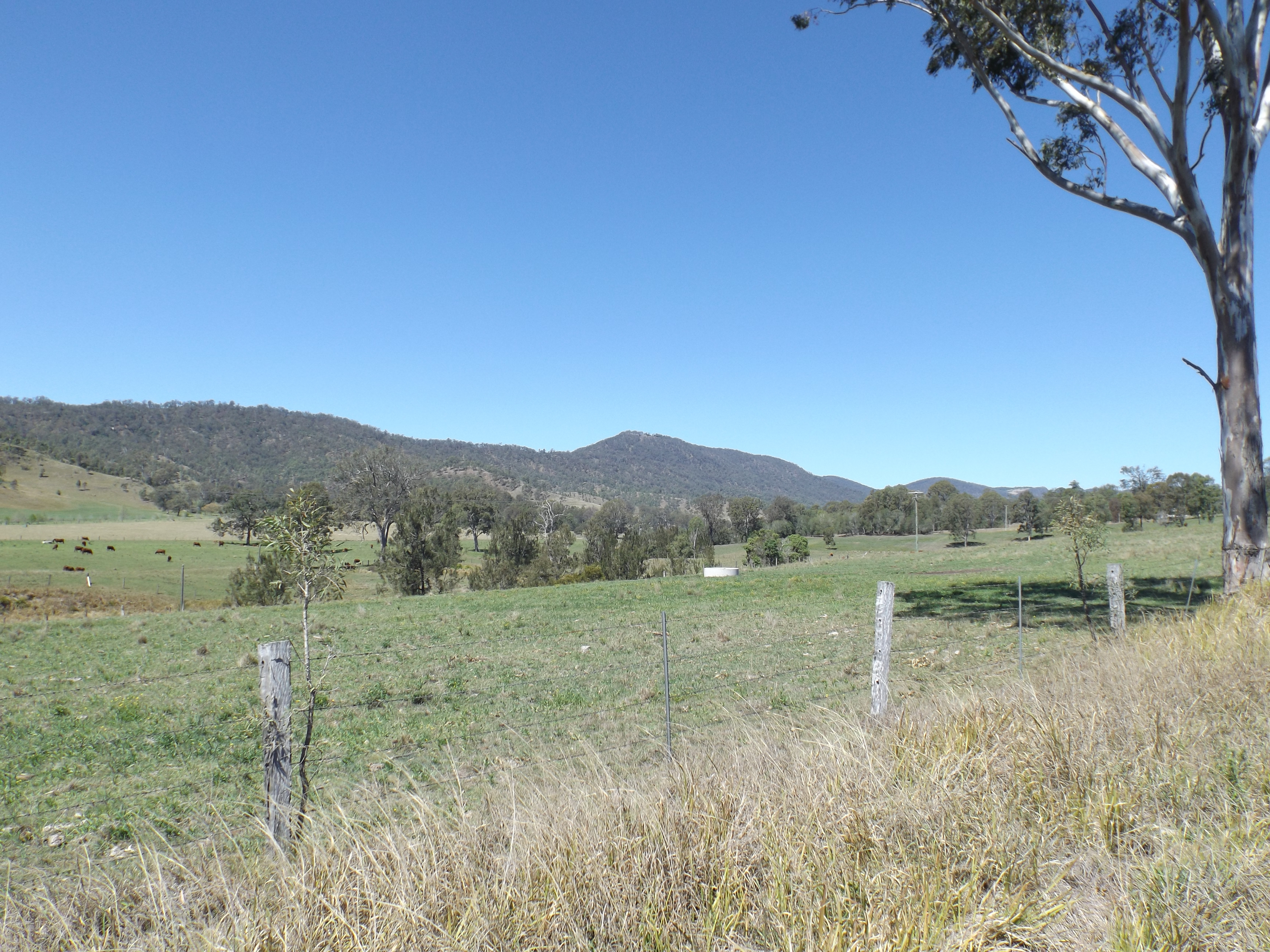
- Paddocks at Cainbable, 2014

- Interactive map of Cainbable
- Coordinates: 28.1466°S 153.0969°E
- Country: Australia
- State: Queensland
- LGA: Scenic Rim Region
- Location: 21.5 km (13.4 mi) SSE of Beaudesert; 90.3 km (56.1 mi) S of Brisbane CBD

Government
  - State electorate: Scenic Rim
  - Federal division: Wright

Area
  - Total: 35.9 km^{2} (13.9 sq mi)

Population
  - Total: 85 (2021 census)
  - Density: 2.368/km^{2} (6.13/sq mi)
- Time zone: UTC+10:00 (AEST)
- Postcode: 4285
Suburbs around Cainbable
| Nindooinbah | Nindooinbah | Sarabah |
| Kerry | Cainbable | Sarabah |
| Kerry | O'Reilly | O'Reilly |

Cainbable is a rural locality in the Scenic Rim Region, Queensland, Australia. In the 2021 census, Cainbable had a population of 85 people.

== Geography ==
The locality is a long north-south the valley formed around Cainbable Creek, which rises in O'Reilly to the south and then flows north through Cainbable exiting to the north (Nindooinbah) where it becomes a tributary of the Albert River.

There is a mountain, also called Cainbable (28.1332°S 153.1097°E) rising to 656 metres (2,152 ft) on the ridge on the eastern boundary of the locality.

A small area in the south of the locality forms part of the Lamington National Park which extends through neighbouring O'Reilly and Sarabah and areas beyond. Apart from the protected area, the land use is almost entirely grazing on native vegetation with small areas of irrigated pastures and irrigated crop growing in the north of the locality around the creek.

== Demographics ==
In the 2016 census Cainbable had a population of 74 people. The locality contained 36 households, in which 50.7% of the population were males and 49.3% of the population were females with a median age of 49, 11 years above the national average. The average weekly household income was $1,375, $63 below the national average.

In the 2021 census, Cainbable had a population of 85 people.

== Education ==
There are no schools in Cainbable. The nearest government primary schools are Darlington State School in Darlington to the south-west and Canungra State School in Canungra to the north-east. The nearest government secondary schools are Beaudesert State High School in Beaudesert to the north-west and Tamborine Mountain State High School in Tamborine Mountain to the north-east.

== Attractions ==
The locality's elevated terrain provides many opportunities for excellent vistas along Duck Creek Road, from north to south:

- Jean and Tom Lookout (28.1789°S 153.0916°E)
- Barram's Outlook (28.1800°S 153.0920°E)
- Rics Lookout (28.1806°S 153.0927°E)
- Tom's Lookout (28.1818°S 153.0982°E)
- Father Busser of St Mary's Lookout (28.1820°S 153.0984°E)
- Sister Catharina's Bend (28.1834°S 153.0959°E)
- Jackies Rest (28.1840°S 153.0959°E)
- Hugh's Haven (28.1843°S 153.0962°E)
- Rogers Corner (28.1853°S 153.0986°E)
- Lookout for Fr Canzer (28.1868°S 153.0947°E)
- Shepards Lookout (28.1879°S 153.0934°E)
- Kerry Lookout (28.1883°S 153.0959°E)
- Kurrajong Lookout (28.1944°S 153.0949°E)
