= Christmas Creek, Queensland =

Christmas Creek
- Suburb
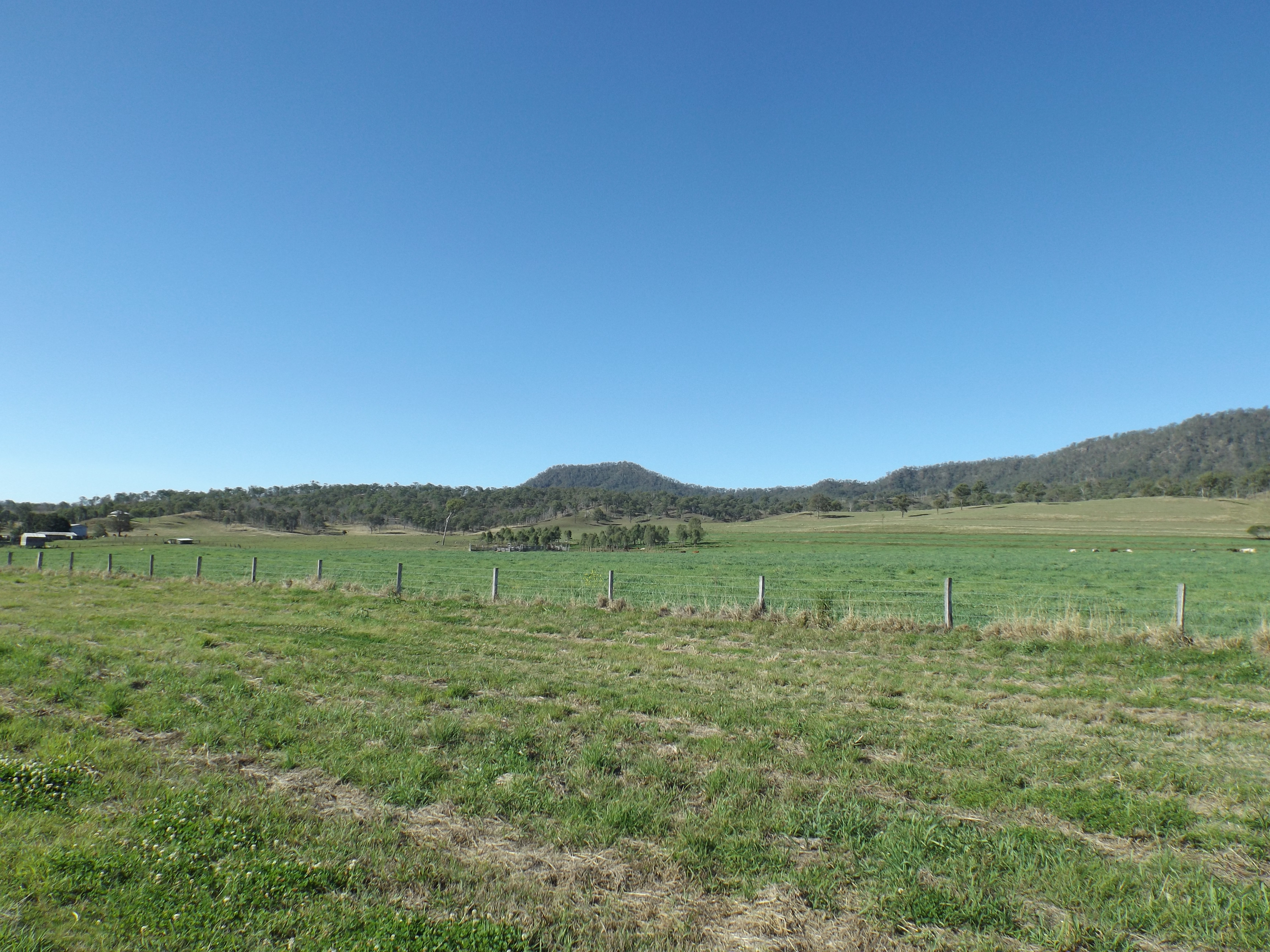
- Fields along Christmas Creek Road, 2014

- Interactive map of Christmas Creek
- Coordinates: 28.1811°S 152.9897°E
- Country: Australia
- State: Queensland
- LGA: Scenic Rim Region
- Location: 26.5 km (16.5 mi) S of Beaudesert; 95.7 km (59.5 mi) S of Brisbane

Government
  - State electorate: Scenic Rim
  - Federal division: Wright

Area
  - Total: 41.2 km^{2} (15.9 sq mi)

Population
  - Total: 88 (2021 census)
  - Density: 2.136/km^{2} (5.53/sq mi)
- Time zone: UTC+10:00 (AEST)
- Postcode: 4285
Suburbs around Christmas Creek
| Tabooba | Tabooba | Kerry |
| Oaky Creek | Christmas Creek | Kerry |
| Oaky Creek | Hillview | Darlington |

Christmas Creek is a rural locality in the Scenic Rim Region, Queensland, Australia. In the 2021 census, Christmas Creek had a population of 88 people.

== Geography ==
The eastern border of the locality is marked by the high point of the Jinbroken Range while the west is similar defined by another ridgeline. Christmas Creek, a tributary of the Logan River flows in north–south direction roughly parallel to the only main road in the area called Christmas Creek Road.

== History ==
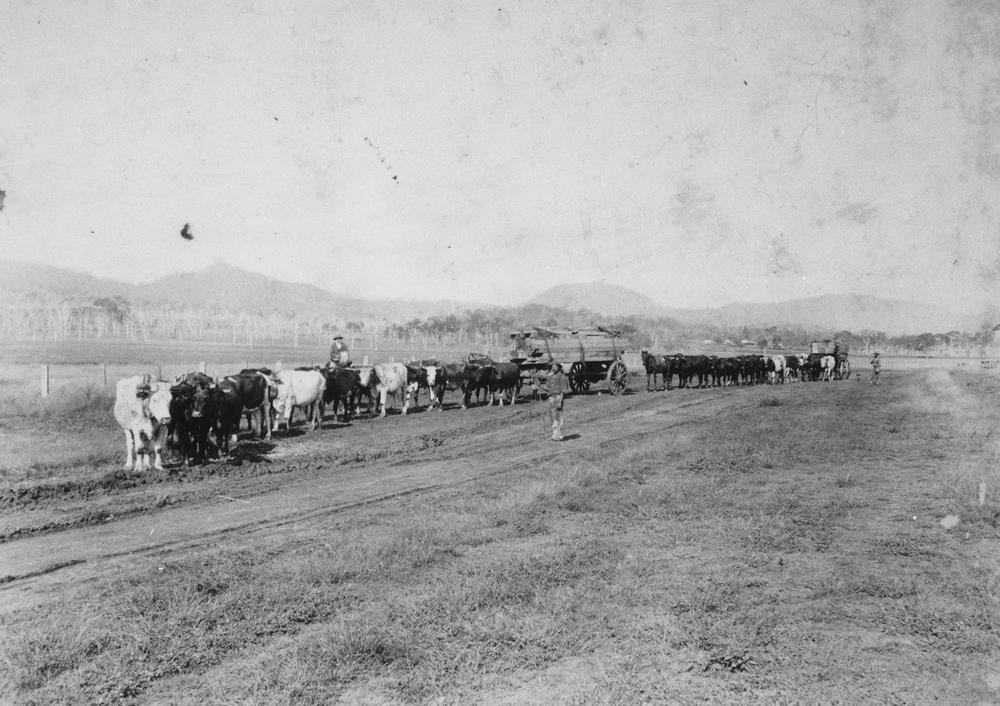
Bullock teams transporting timber, 1910

Like many places in South East Queensland the first industry to developed was timber-getting.

Between 1872 and 1877 land was resumed from the Telemon pastoral run. Some of this land makes up what is now Christmas Creek. Agriculture soon became the area's main industry.

In 1877 the name of the post office changed from Telemon to Christmas Creek.

Christmas Creek Provisional School opened on 23 September 1878 but closed on 8 July 1881.

Christmas Creek Provisional opened on 5 July 1887 (higher up the creek than the previous school). In 1901 it became Christmas Creek State School. In 1914, the school was renamed Hillview State School.

Buddi (also spelled Buddai) Provisional School opened either in 1878 or 1904 and closed in 1908. It was on Strong Road (approx 28.1890°S 152.9843°E) and there is monument at the site.

The Beaudesert Shire Tramway had a station at Christmas Creek. The station was once known as Lillybank and for several years was the line's terminus.

== Demographics ==
In the 2016 census, Christmas Creek had a population of 53 people. The locality contained 34 households, in which 50.0% of the population were males and 50.0% of the population were females with a median age of 54, 16 years above the national average. The average weekly household income was $933, $505 below the national average.

In the 2021 census, Christmas Creek had a population of 88 people.

== Heritage listings ==
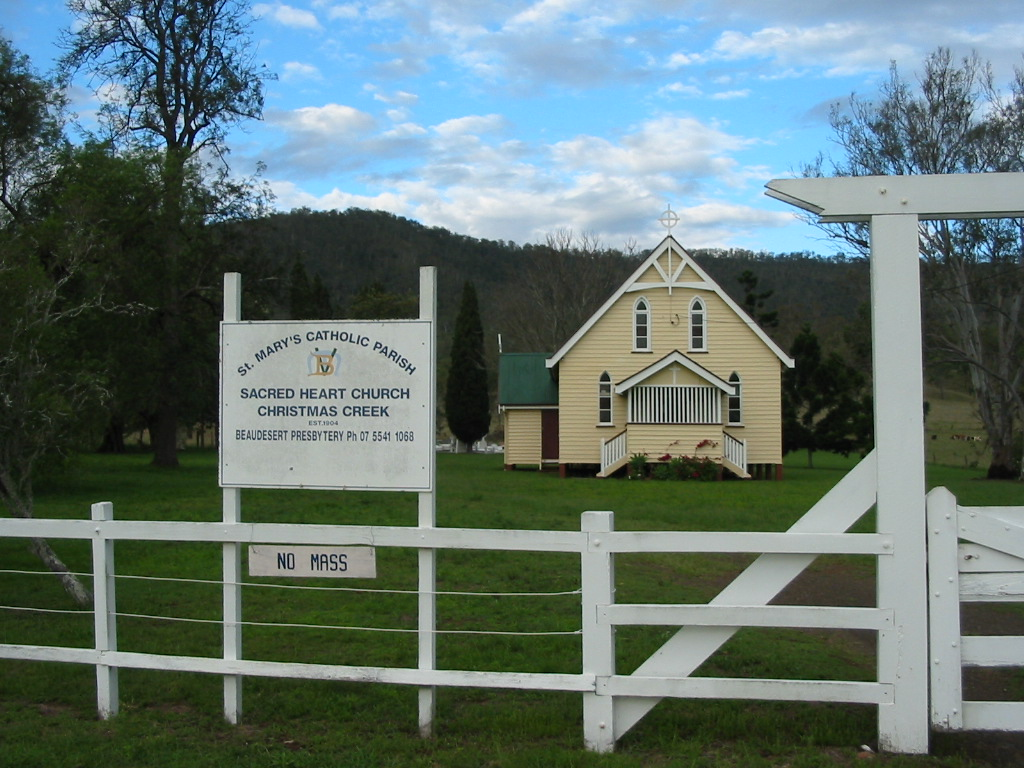
Sacred Heart Catholic Church, 2005

Christmas Creek has the following heritage sites:

- 1441 Christmas Creek Road: Catholic Church and Cemetery

== Education ==
There are no schools in Christmas Creek. The nearest government primary school is Hillview State School in neighbouring Hillview. The nearest government secondary school is Beaudesert State High School in Beaudesert .
