= Kerry, Queensland =

Kerry
- Town
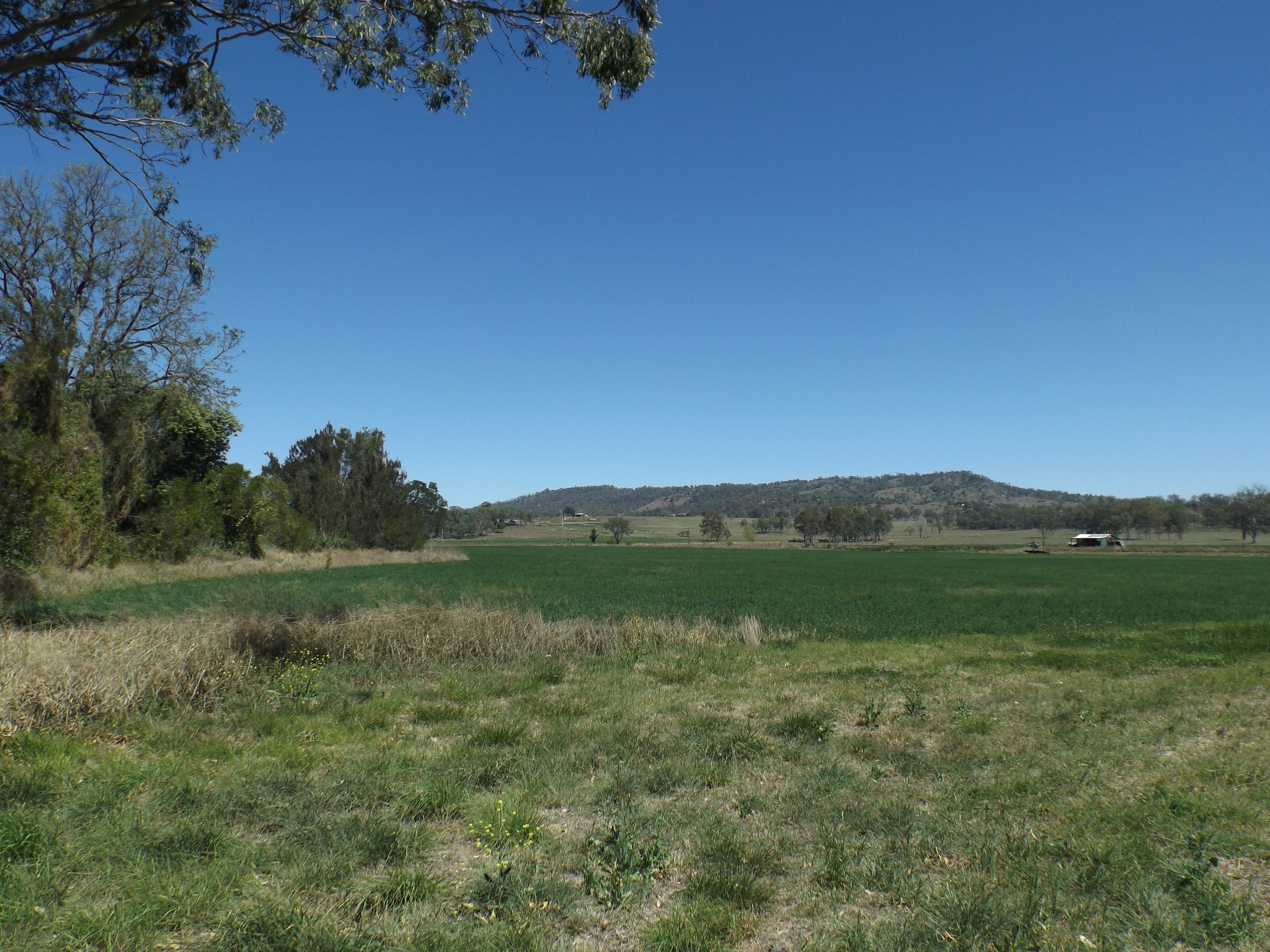
- Fields along Albert River, 2014

- Interactive map of Kerry
- Coordinates: 28.1038°S 153.0336°E
- Country: Australia
- State: Queensland
- LGA: Scenic Rim Region
- Location: 16.4 km (10.2 mi) S of Beaudesert; 85.6 km (53.2 mi) S of Brisbane CBD

Government
  - State electorate: Scenic Rim
  - Federal division: Wright

Area
  - Total: 101.7 km^{2} (39.3 sq mi)

Population
  - Total: 306 (2021 census)
  - Density: 3.009/km^{2} (7.793/sq mi)
- Time zone: UTC+10:00 (AEST)
- Postcode: 4285
Localities around Kerry
Cryna	Beaudesert	Nindooinbah
Tabooba; Laravale	Kerry	Cainbable
Christmas Creek	Darlington	O'Reilly

Kerry is a rural locality in the Scenic Rim Region, Queensland, Australia. In the 2021 census, the locality of Kerry had a population of 306 people.

== History ==
The Nindooinbah (also spelled Nindooimbah) pastoral run was originally selected in the early 1840s by Alfred Compigne, and was subsequently purchased by William Duckett White. The White family variously owned and leased the whole of the land from the present town of Beaudesert as well as a large proportion of the land running from Beaudesert to the shores of the Pacific Ocean, in the neighbourhood of Nerang, Southport, and Coomera. This large land holding was cut up into smaller properties. In 1877, 12,000 acres (4,900 ha) was resumed from the Nooininbah and Kerrylarabah pastoral runs and offered for selection on 17 April 1877. Eventually Nindooimbah was reduced to an area of about 18,000 acres (7,300 ha; 73 km^{2}), of which a further 9,500 acres (3,800 ha; 38 km^{2}) was sold to William Collins.

A 10-acre (4.0 ha) site for a Catholic church was either donated by John Horan senior, or was a reserve for a school, purchased for £10 from the Crown by Father Benedict Scortechini (the first Catholic priest resident in the district). St Columba's Catholic Church was built in 1883 and was a small timber structure, being also used as a school from 1884. When the old St Mary's church in Beaudesert was replaced by a larger building (the current St Mary's), the old St Mary's church was relocated to Kerry and renamed St John's Catholic Church, while St Columba's church was sold to local farmer Tom Plunkett and was relocated to be used by him as a barn. St John's was officially opened on 28 June 1908. There is a Catholic cemetery behind the church.

Kerry Provisional School opened on 25 February 1884 at St Columba's Catholic Church. On 1 November 1914, it became Kerry State School. It closed on 28 August 1943. It was at 307 Kerry West Road (via Ward Lane, 28.13551°S 153.03448°E).

On 7 May 1906 at Beaudesert School of Arts, auctioneers Isles, Love & Co offered 26 dairy farms, ranging in area from 118 to 1,223 acres (48 to 495 ha; 0.48 to 4.95 km^{2}), totalling 6,092 acres (2,465 ha; 24.65 km^{2}) in the Nindooimbah Estate along the Albert River and Kerry Creek (in present-day southern Nindooinbah and northern Kerry). The section for sale was known as the Kerry Paddocks, which have been subdivided into twenty-six dairy farms.

Kerry Post Office opened on 1 July 1927 and closed in 1939.

== Demographics ==
In the 2011 census, the locality of Kerry recorded a population of 433 people, 48.7% female and 51.3% male. The median age of the Kerry population was 44 years, 7 years above the national median of 37. 87.9% of people living in Kerry were born in Australia. The other top responses for country of birth were England 2.1%, New Zealand 1.2%, Germany 0.7%, Ireland 0.7%, Belgium 0.7%. 93.5% of people spoke only English at home; the next most common languages were 0.7% Indonesian, 0.7% Spanish.

In the 2016 census, the locality of Kerry had a population of 326 people.

In the 2021 census, the locality of Kerry had a population of 306 people.

== Heritage listings ==
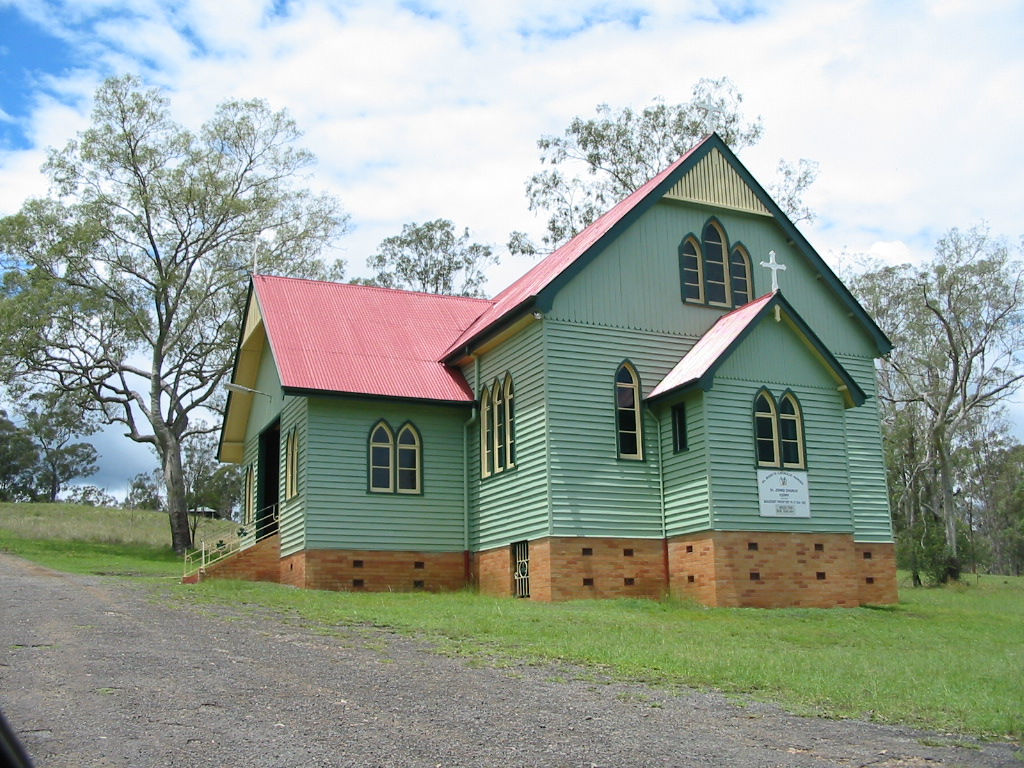
St John's Catholic Church, 2005

Kerry has the following heritage-listed sites:

- St John’s Catholic Church and Cemetery, 1823 Kerry Road (28.1277°S 153.0427°E)

== Education ==
There are no schools in Kerry. The nearest government primary schools are Beaudesert State School in neighbouring Beaudesert to the north and Darlington State School in neighbouring Darlington to the south. The nearest government secondary school is Beaudesert State High School in Beaudesert to the north.

== Notable people ==
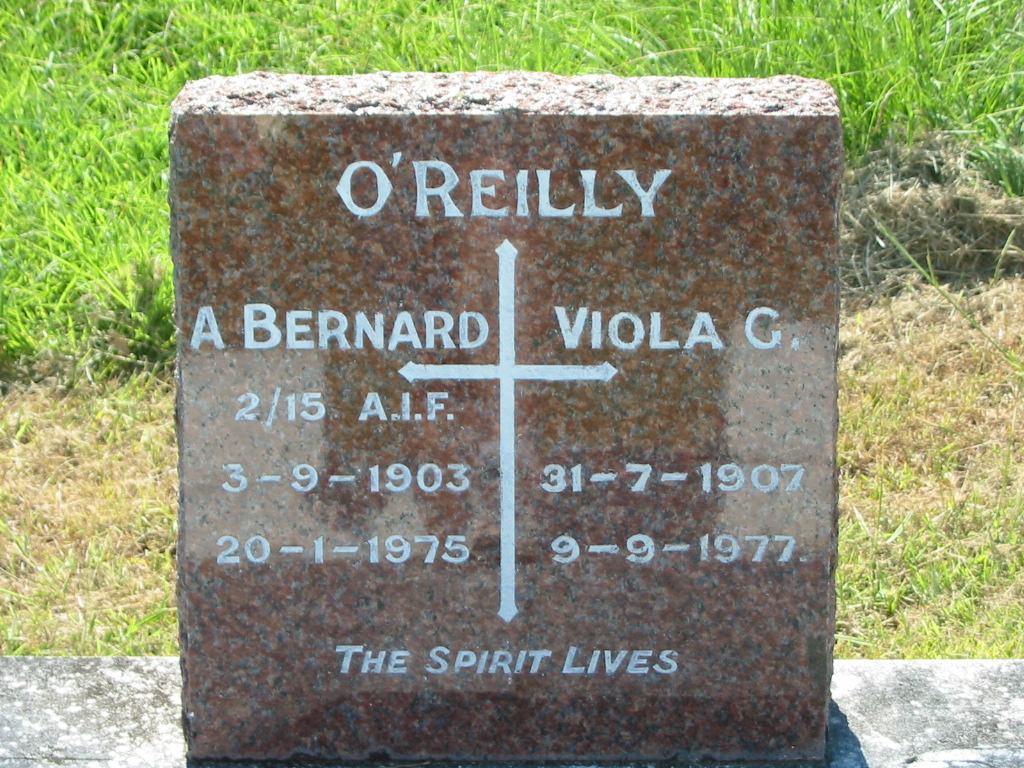
Bernard O'Reilly headstone, St Johns Catholic Church, Kerry

- Bernard O'Reilly, the bushman and author is buried in St John's Catholic Church cemetery
- Thomas Plunkett, senior, dairy farmer and politician
- Thomas Punkett, junior, dairy farmer and politician
