= Josephville, Queensland =

Josephville
- Town
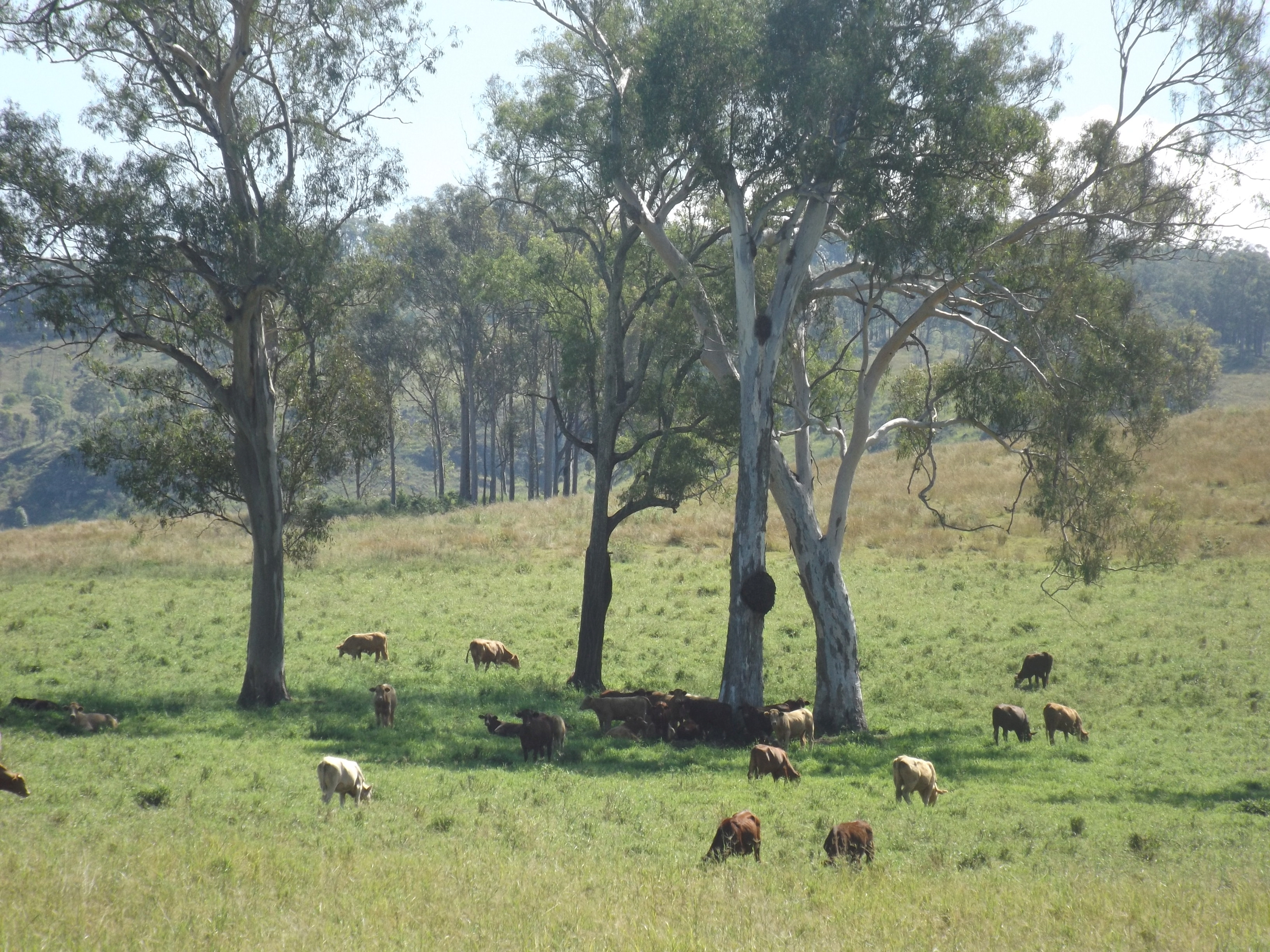
- Paddocks along The Hollows Road, 2016

- Interactive map of Josephville
- Coordinates: 28.0333°S 152.9016°E
- Country: Australia
- State: Queensland
- LGA: Scenic Rim Region
- Location: 10.5 km (6.5 mi) WSW of Beaudesert; 76.4 km (47.5 mi) SSW of Brisbane CBD

Government
  - State electorate: Scenic Rim
  - Federal division: Wright

Area
  - Total: 60.1 km^{2} (23.2 sq mi)

Population
  - Total: 172 (2021 census)
  - Density: 2.862/km^{2} (7.412/sq mi)
- Time zone: UTC+10:00 (AEST)
- Postcode: 4285
Localities around Josephville
| Bromelton | Bromelton | Beaudesert |
| Bromelton | Josephville | Cryna |
| Kooralbyn | Laravale | Laravale |

Josephville is a rural locality in the Scenic Rim Region, Queensland, Australia. In the 2021 census, the locality of Josephville had a population of 172 people.

The primary land use in the area is agriculture.

== Geography ==
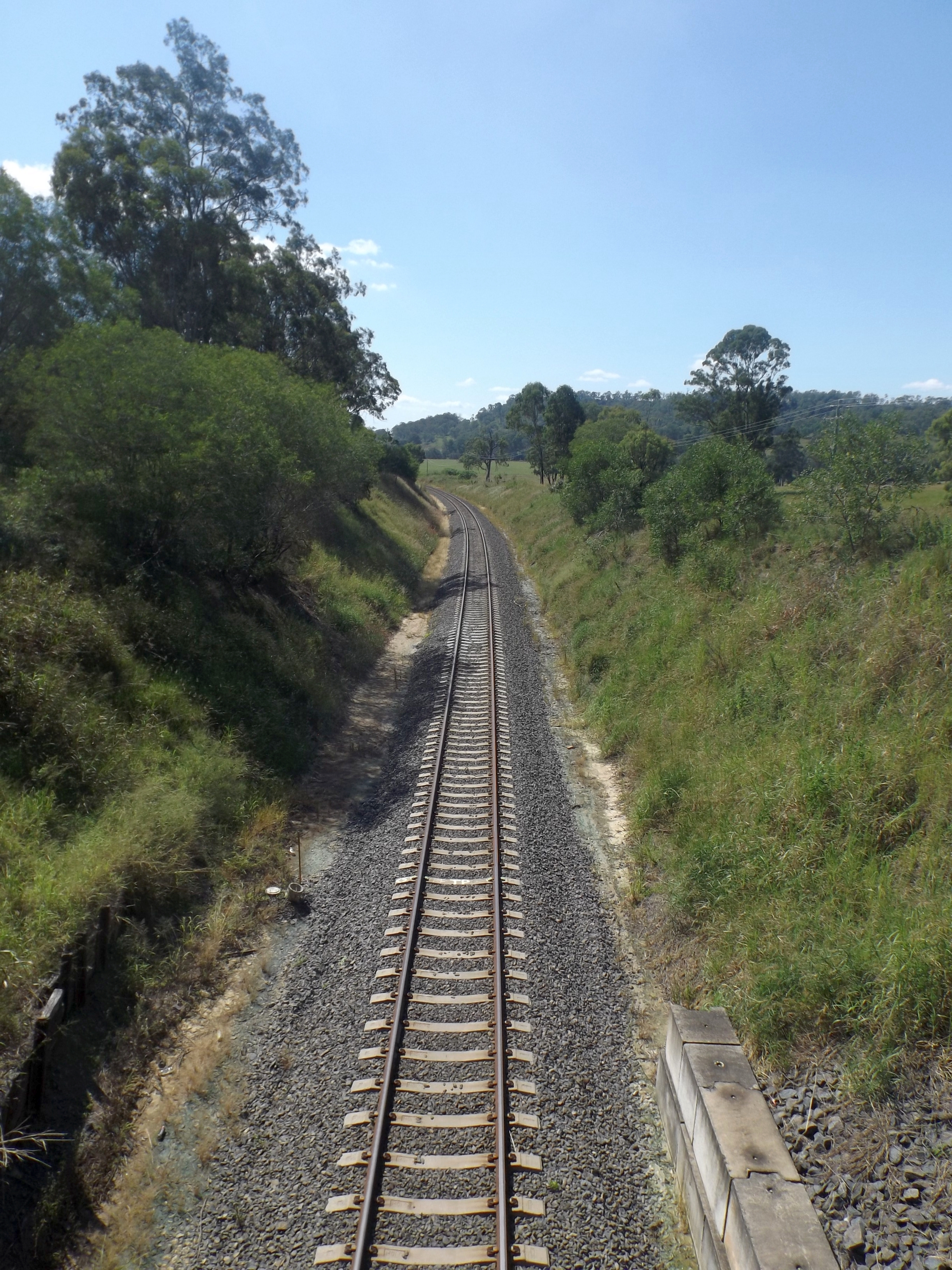
Sydney–Brisbane rail corridor, 2016

Part of the northern border is marked by the Logan River and its tributary Sandy Creek, while a section of the southern border also follows the Logan River. In the west, the land rises to elevations above 500 metres (1,600 ft) above sea level. Both the Mount Lindesay Highway and the Sydney–Brisbane rail corridor pass through Josephville.

== History ==
The Beaudesert Shire Tramway, which operated from 1903 to 1944, had a station in Josephville.

Josephville was once part of Beaudesert Shire, a former local government area.

Tenders to build Tamrookum Lower State School were called in May 1909, and A.C. Lather's tender of £181 5s was accepted in June 1909. The school opened on 4 November 1909. On 15 October 1928, it was renamed Josephville State School. Due to poor attendance, it closed on 1 September 1935.

== Demographics ==
In the 2021 census, the population of Josephville was 166. The locality contained 65 households, with 47.0% of the population being males and 53.0% females. The median age was 43, five years above the national average. The average weekly household income was $1,312, $126 below the national average. 1.8% of Josephville's population were of Aboriginal or Torres Strait Islander descent. 55.9% of the population aged 15 or over were either registered or de facto married, while 44.1% were not married, and 26.7% of the population were attending some form of education. The most common nominated ancestries were Australian (34.7%), English (30.7%) and Irish (15.1%), while the most common country of birth was Australia (90.6%), and the most commonly spoken language at home was English (94.4%). The most common nominated religions were Catholic (25.8%), Anglican (23.9%) and the Uniting Church (17.2%). The most common occupation was manager (23.1%), and the majority of residents worked 40 or more hours per week (59.1%).

In the 2021 census, the locality of Josephville had a population of 172 people.

== Economy ==
The locality contains a number of homesteads:

- Mountain Dale (28.0305°S 152.9204°E)
- Riverleigh (28.0121°S 152.9389°E)
- Tally-Ho (28.0110°S 152.9334°E)
- The Hollow (28.0388°S 152.8921°E)

== Education ==
There are no schools in Josephville. The nearest government primary schools are Tamrookum State School in Tamrookum to the south and Beaudesert State School in neighbouring Beaudesert to the north west. The nearest government secondary school is Beaudesert State High School in Beaudesert.

== See also ==
- List of tramways in Queensland
