= Innisplain, Queensland =

Innisplain
- Suburb
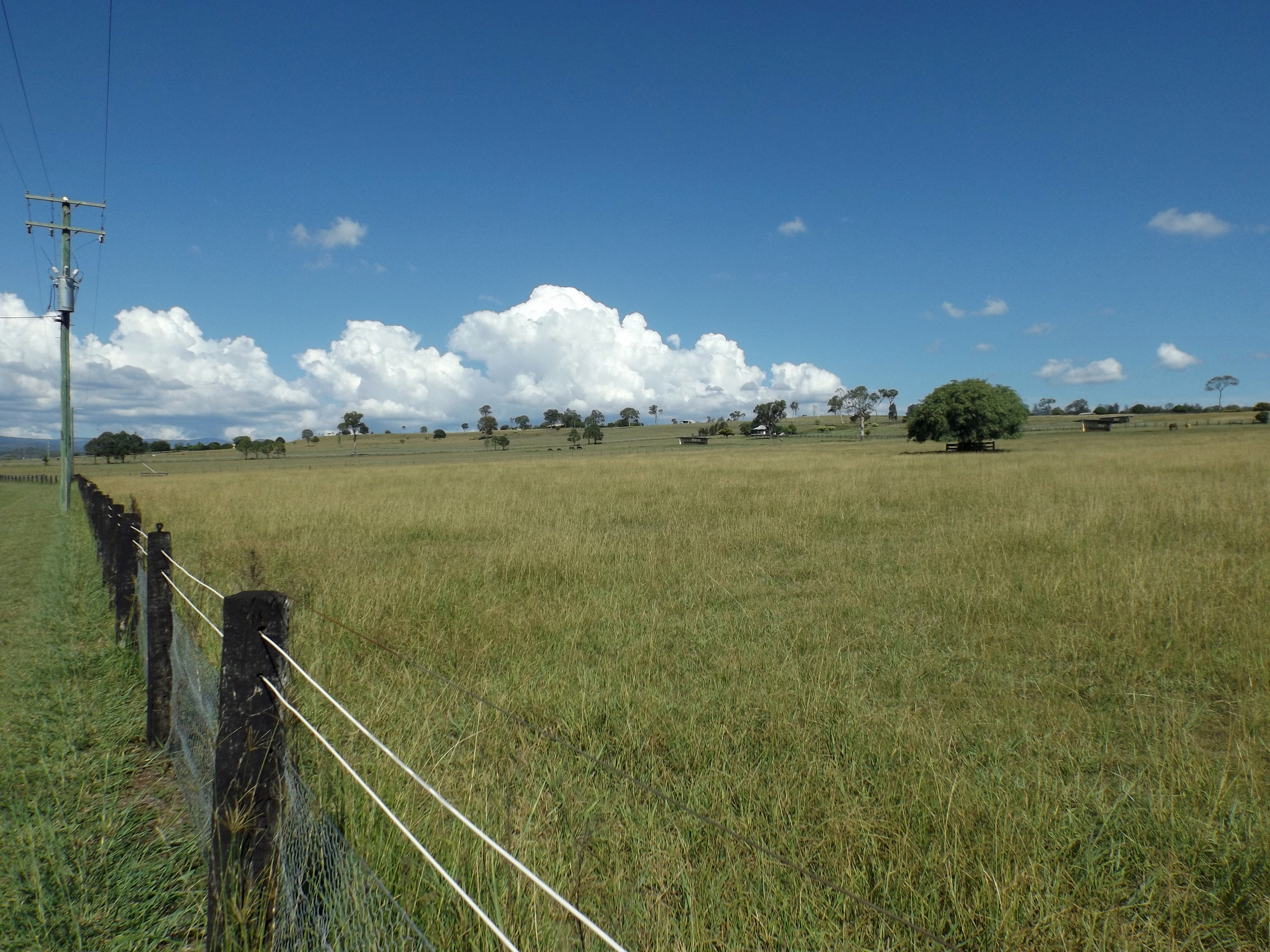
- Paddocks along Oaky Scrub Road, 2016

- Interactive map of Innisplain
- Coordinates: 28.1786°S 152.9055°E
- Country: Australia
- State: Queensland
- LGA: Scenic Rim Region
- Location: 25.8 km (16.0 mi) SSW of Beaudesert; 95.0 km (59.0 mi) SSW of Brisbane CBD

Government
  - State electorate: Scenic Rim
  - Federal division: Wright

Area
  - Total: 22.9 km^{2} (8.8 sq mi)

Population
  - Total: 79 (2021 census)
  - Density: 3.450/km^{2} (8.93/sq mi)
- Time zone: UTC+10:00 (AEST)
- Postcode: 4285
Suburbs around Innisplain
| Knapp Creek | Tamrookum | Tabooba |
| Tamrookum Creek | Innisplain | Oaky Creek |
| Rathdowney | Running Creek | Oaky Creek |

Innisplain is a rural locality in the Scenic Rim Region, Queensland, Australia. In the 2021 census, Innisplain had a population of 79 people.

== Geography ==
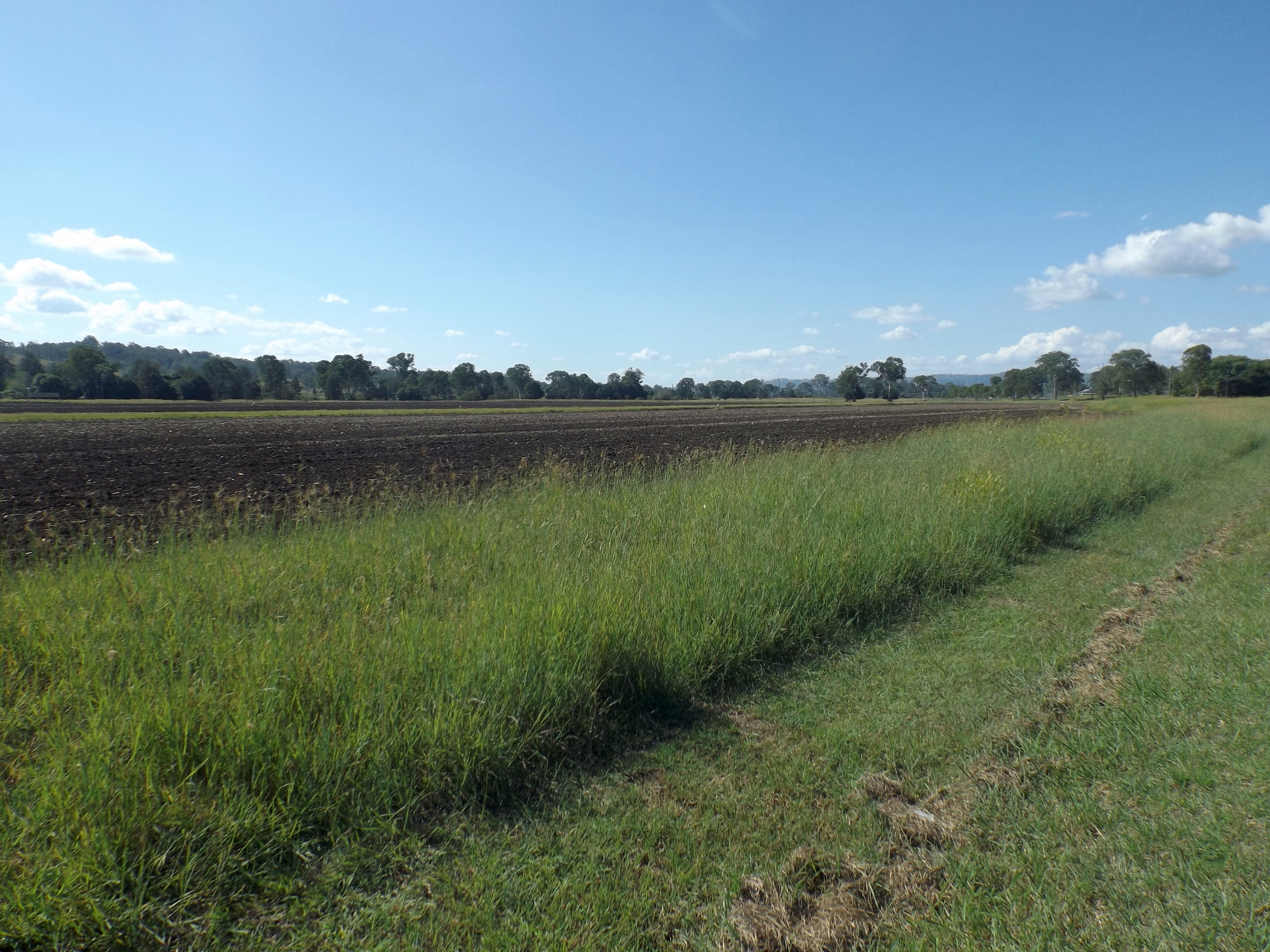
Fields, 2016

Part of the Logan River and the Mount Lindesay Highway marks the western boundary. The area is hilly with some land used for agriculture. The Sydney–Brisbane rail corridor passes through the area, with the Mt Lindesay Highway crossing the interstate railway line at Innisplain.

== History ==
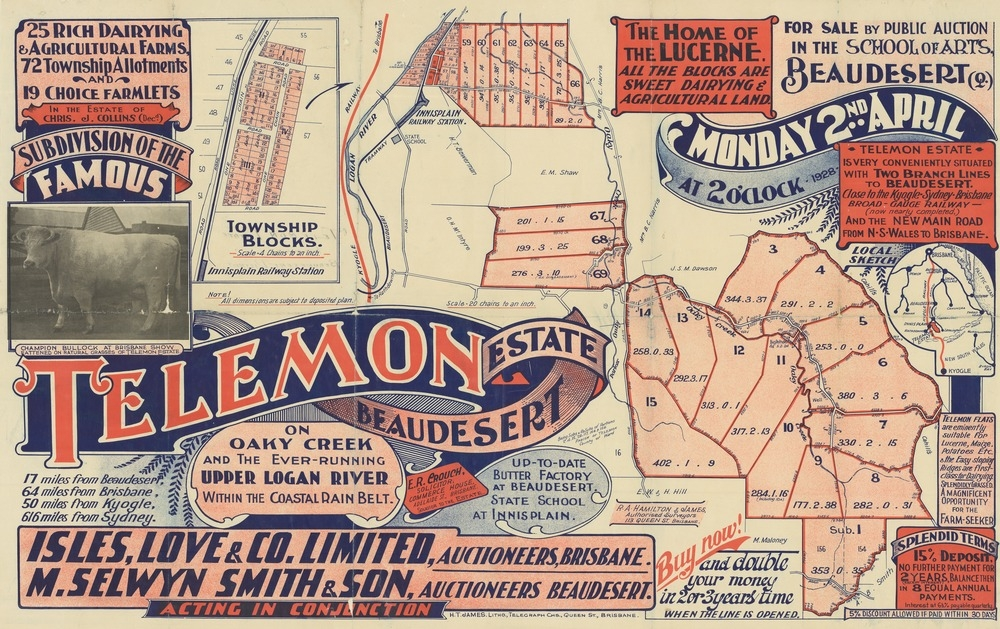
Real estate map of Telemon Estate, 1928

A railway station on the Beaudesert Shire Tramway was located at Innisplain, opening in 1903. A state school operated from 1921 to 1962.

In 1877, 15,400 acres (6,200 ha) were resumed from the Telemon pastoral run and offered for selection on 17 April 1877.

Innisplain State School opened on 7 November 1921 and closed on 31 December 1962. It was on Innisplain Road (28.1759°S 152.9038°E).

== Demographics ==
In the 2016 census, Innisplain had a population of 85 people. The locality contains 40 households, in which 64.3% of the population are males and 35.7% of the population are females with a median age of 37, 1 year below the national average. The average weekly household income is $1,437, $1 below the national average.

In the 2021 census, Innisplain had a population of 79 people.

== Economy ==
There are a number of homesteads in the locality:

- Innisplain (28.1715°S 152.9082°E)
- Telemon (28.1528°S 152.9276°E)
- Yaralla (28.2006°S 152.9010°E)

== Education ==
There are no schools in Innisplain. The nearest government primary schools are Tamrookum State School in neighbouring Tamrookum to the north and Rathdowney State School in neighbouring Rathdowney to the south-west. The nearest government secondary school is Beaudesert State High School in Beaudesert to the north-east.
