= Scenic Rim Region =

Coordinates: 27°59′15″S 152°59′43″E

- Local government area
- Location within South East Queensland

- Interactive map of Scenic Rim Region
- Country: Australia
- State: Queensland
- Region: West Moreton
- Established: 2008
- Council seat: Beaudesert

Government
  - Mayor: Tom Sharp
  - State electorate: Scenic Rim
  - Federal division: Wright

Area
  - Total: 4,243 km^{2} (1,638 sq mi)

Population
  - Total: 42,984 (2021 census)
  - Density: 10.1306/km^{2} (26.238/sq mi)
- Website: Scenic Rim Region
LGAs around Scenic Rim Region
Lockyer Valley	Ipswich	Logan
Southern Downs	Scenic Rim Region	Gold Coast
Southern Downs	Kyogle (NSW)	Tweed (NSW)

The Scenic Rim Region is a local government area (LGA) in the West Moreton region of South East Queensland, Australia. Established in 2008, it was preceded by several previous local government areas with histories extending back to the early 1900s and beyond. The main town of the region is Beaudesert.

It has an estimated operating budget of A$33 million.

In the 2021 census, the Scenic Rim Region had a population of 42,984 people.

== History ==
Prior to 2008, the new Scenic Rim Region was an entire area of three previous and distinct local government areas:

- the Shire of Boonah;
- the southern part of the Shire of Beaudesert;
- and the Harrisville and Peak Crossing areas from the City of Ipswich.

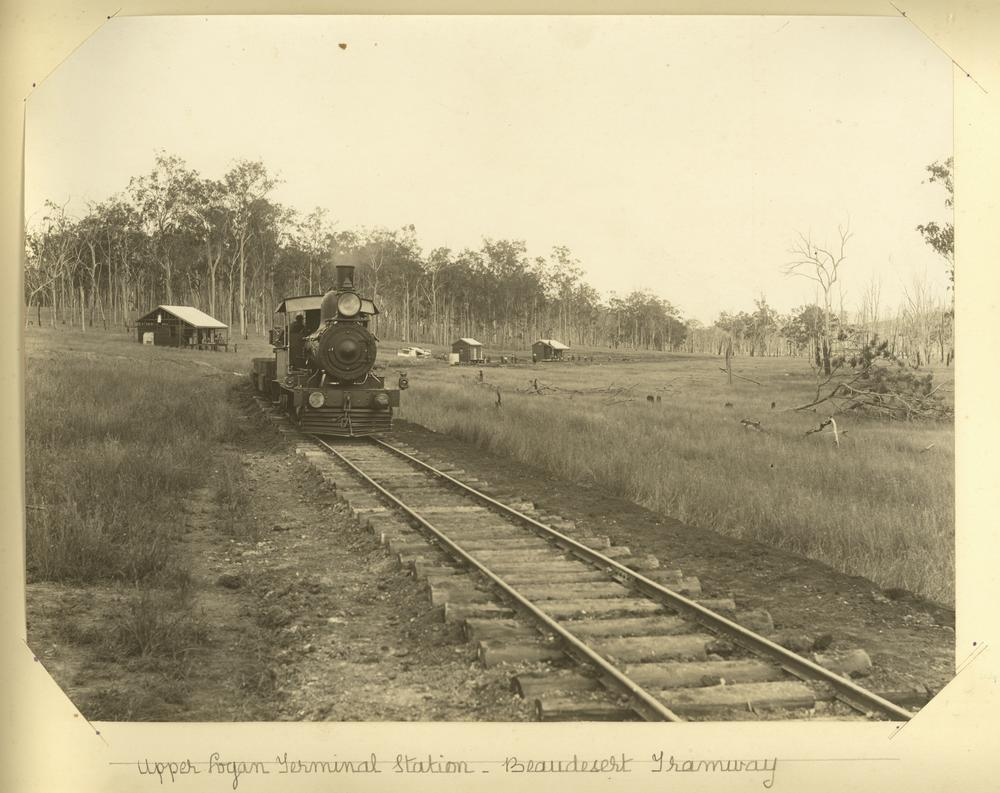
Beaudesert Shire Tramway, 1903

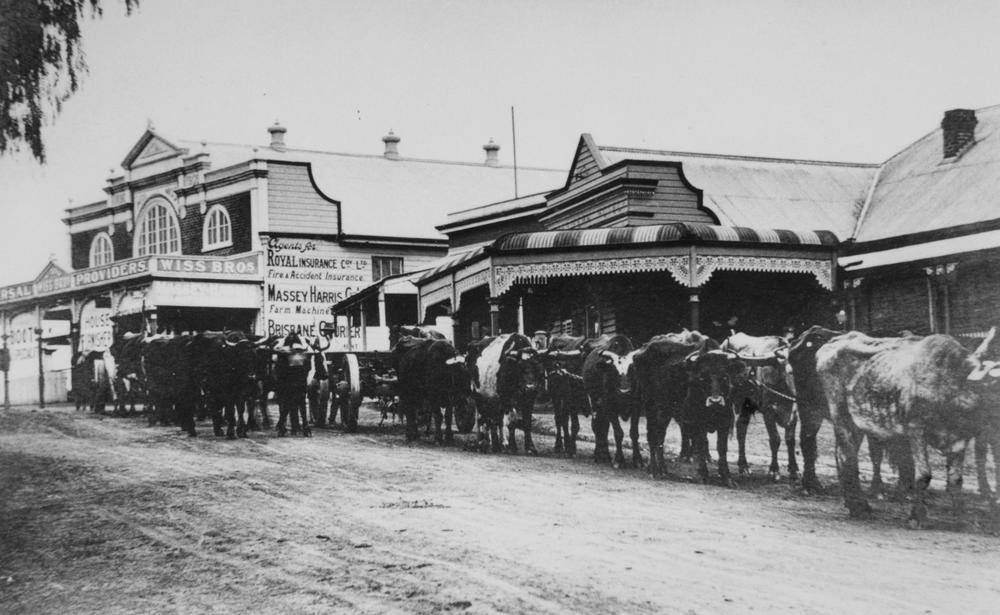
A bullock team at Kalbar, 1915

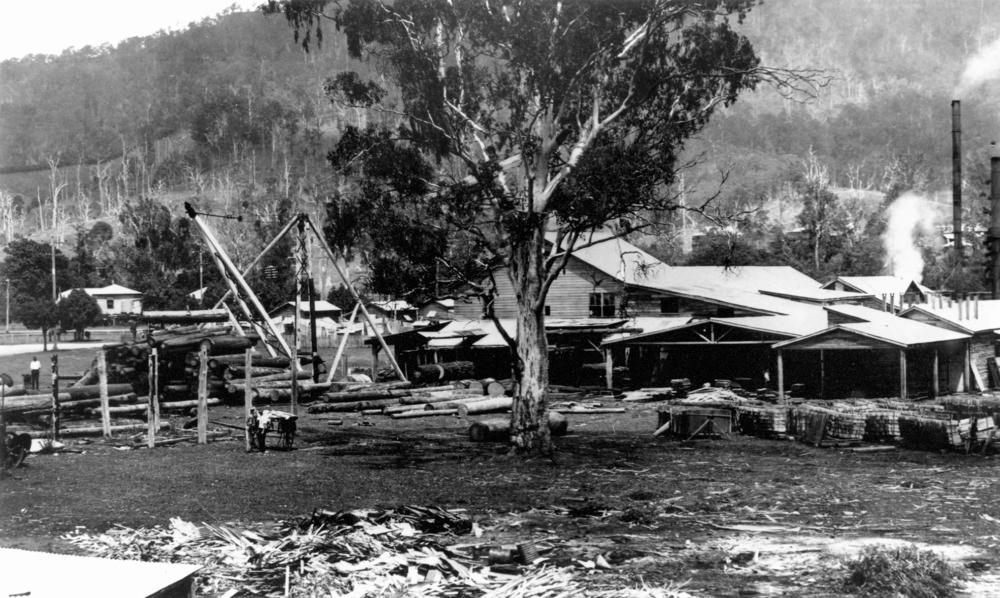
Timber yards at Canungra, 1939

In July 2007, the Local Government Reform Commission released its report and recommended that the areas amalgamate. It identified a rural community of interest as well as ecotourism potential from the Scenic Rim, a group of mountain ranges forming part of the Great Dividing Range, and recommended the transfer of the entire urban growth corridor previously within Beaudesert to Logan City. Along with Lockyer Valley and Somerset, it was expected to provide a rural hinterland for urban South East Queensland. The arrangement was Boonah's second preference (its first was simply absorbing the rural areas of Ipswich) while Beaudesert opposed splitting or amalgamation.

The legislation passed to effect the merger on 10 August 2007. A Local Transition Committee made up of staff and councillors of the dissolving entities was formed to manage the process. On 15 March 2008, the Shires formally ceased to exist, and elections were held on the same day to elect councillors and a mayor to the Regional Council.

== Geography ==
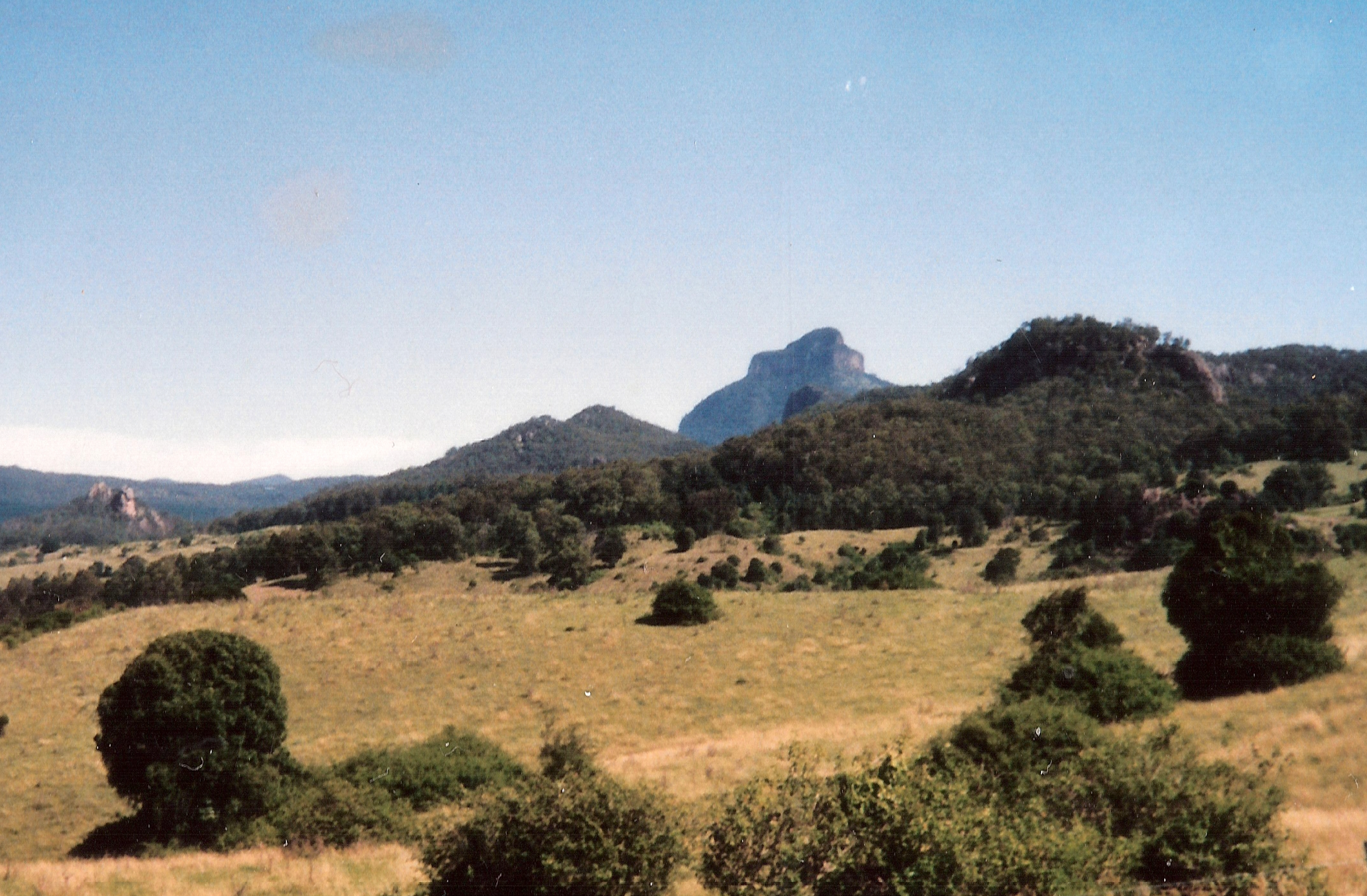
Mount Lindesay from Palen Creek

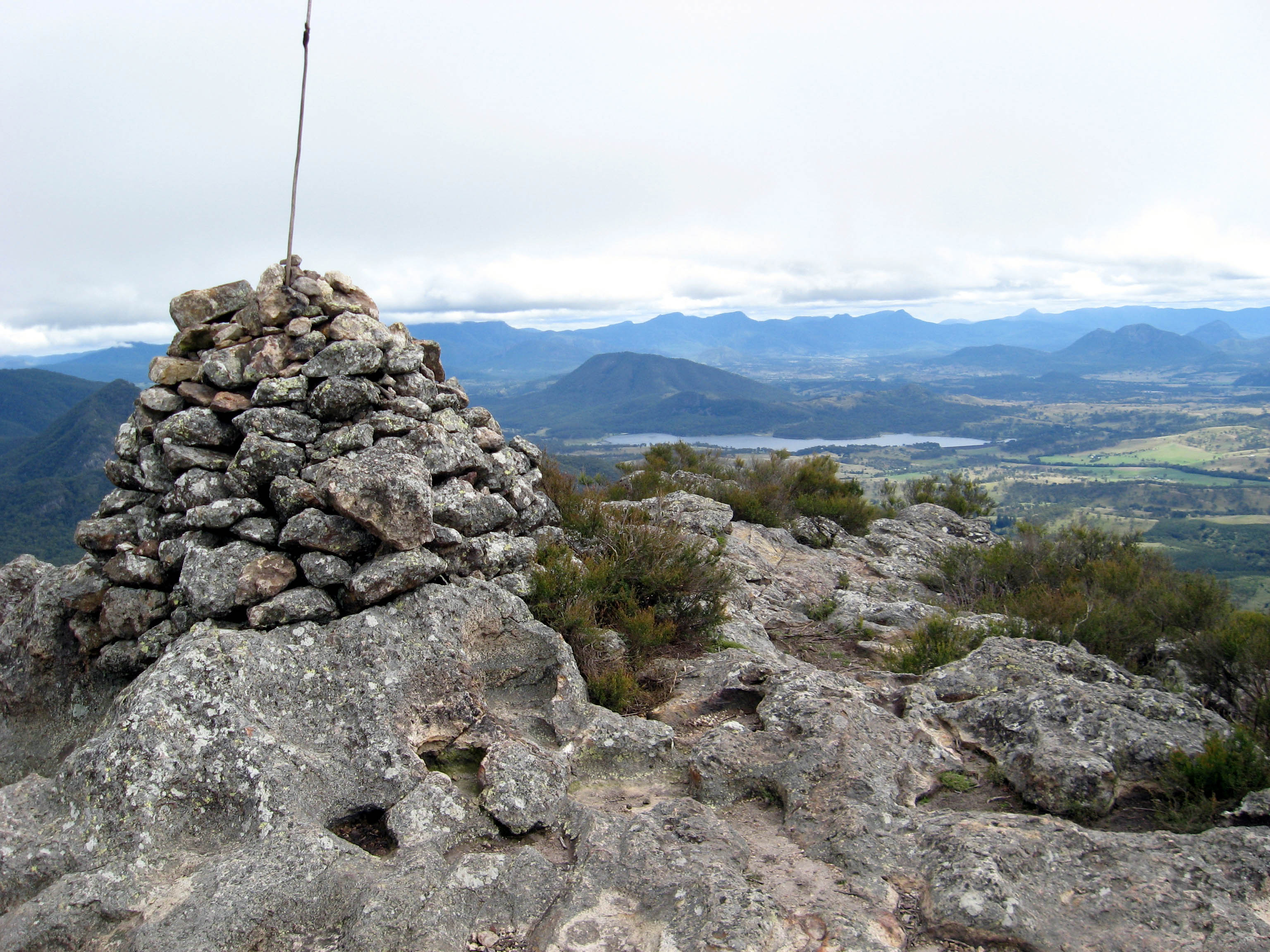
Mount Maroon, 2009

The region is mostly rural, with Beaudesert and Boonah the main towns. It lies within the catchment areas of the Bremer River, the Logan River/Albert River and the Coomera River/Nerang River. The centre of the area is dominated by the Flinders Peak Group and broad sweep of mountainous terrain forming a southern boundary with the local government area on Queensland's southern border with New South Wales. Many high-altitude areas are covered by forests and protected in national parks (including World Heritage listings) at Tamborine Mountain, McPherson Range, Main Range National Park, Mount Barney National Park and landforms including Cunninghams Gap and Fassifern Valley. South East Queensland's highest mountain is Mount Barney, reaching 1,356 metres (4,449 ft) above sea level. Wyaralong Dam is the region's newest reservoir.

In the south east of the local government area is the Lamington National Park. It includes villages such as Canungra, Kooralbyn, Rathdowney, Beechmont and Harrisville. The peak at Mount French, part of Moogerah Peaks National Park is noted for its traditional rock climbing and does not have bolted climbing routes. The peak also boasts a '32' rated climb (one of the hardest in the world) which attracts international rock climbing visitors to the area. The area of Boonah is fairly flat with large areas of very productive soils for the growing of vegetables and other crops. Beechmont and O'Reillys are mountainous areas overlooking the Gold Coast hinterland. These areas attract visitors for camping, bushwalking and bird watching.

== Council ==
The council is split into six wards (divisions), each returning one councillor, along with a directly-elected mayor.

=== Current composition ===
The current council, elected in 2024, is:

Ward	Councillor	Party
Mayor	Tom Sharp	Independent
Division 1	Amanda Hay	Independent
Division 2	Kerri Cryer	Independent
Division 3	Stephen Moriarty	Independent
Division 4	Jennifer Sanders	Independent
Division 5	Marshall Chalk	Independent
Division 6	Duncan McInnes	Independent

== Mayors ==
John Brent was the region's first mayor. He was first elected as a councillor in the Shire of Boonah in 1976 and was chairman of the Shire of Boonah beginning on 12 April 1994, becoming mayor of the Scenic Rim Region following the amalgamation.

=== 2008−present ===
No.	Portrait	Mayor	Party	Term start	Term end	Council control (term)
1		John Brent	Independent	15 March 2008	19 March 2016	Independents majority (2008–present)
2		Greg Christensen	Independent LNP	19 March 2016	26 April 2023	Independents majority (2008–present)
(2)		Greg Christensen	Independent	27 April 2023	16 March 2024	Independents majority (2008–present)
3		Tom Sharp	Independent	16 March 2024	incumbent	Independents majority (2008–present)

=== Deputy mayors ===
In 2016, the council resolved to review the position of deputy mayor annually, instead of having it be the longer-term position it was from 2008 to 2016.

No.	Portrait	Mayor	Party	Term start	Term end	Mayor
1		Dave Cockburn	Independent	2008	2012	Brent (Independent)
2		Virginia West	Independent	2012	2016	Brent (Independent)
3		Nigel Waistell	Independent	2016	2017	Christensen (Ind. LNP/Independent)
4		Nadia O'Carroll	Independent	2017	2018	Christensen (Ind. LNP/Independent)
5		Rick Stanfield	Independent	2018	2019	Christensen (Ind. LNP/Independent)
6		Duncan McInnes	Independent	2019	2021	Christensen (Ind. LNP/Independent)
7		Michael Enright	Independent	2021	2022	Christensen (Ind. LNP/Independent)
8		Jeff McConnell	Independent	2021	2024	Christensen (Ind. LNP/Independent)
9		Duncan McInnes	Independent	2024	incumbent	Sharp (Independent)

== Past councillors ==
=== 2008−present ===
Year	Division 1		Division 2		Division 3		Division 4		Division 5		Division 6	
Year	Councillor	Party	Councillor	Party	Councillor	Party	Councillor	Party	Councillor	Party	Councillor	Party
2008	Derek Swanborough	Independent	Richard Adams	Independent	Virginia West	Independent	Dave Cockburn	Independent	Kathy Bensted	Independent	Heather Wehl	Independent
2012	Nigel Waistell	Independent	Nadia O'Carroll	Independent	Virginia West	Independent	Jennifer Sanders	Independent	Rick Stanfield	Independent	Duncan McInnes	Independent
2016	Nigel Waistell	Independent	Nadia O'Carroll	Independent	Virginia West	Independent	Michael Enright	Independent	Rick Stanfield	Independent	Duncan McInnes	Independent
2020	Derek Swanborough	Independent	Jeff McConnell	Independent	Virginia West	Independent	Michael Enright	Independent	Marshall Chalk	Independent	Duncan McInnes	Independent
2023	Amanda Hay	Independent	Jeff McConnell	Independent	Virginia West	Independent	Michael Enright	Independent	Marshall Chalk	Independent	Duncan McInnes	Independent
2024	Amanda Hay	Independent	Kerri Cryer	Independent	Stephen Moriarty	Independent	Jennifer Sanders	Independent	Marshall Chalk	Independent	Duncan McInnes	Independent

== Towns and localities ==
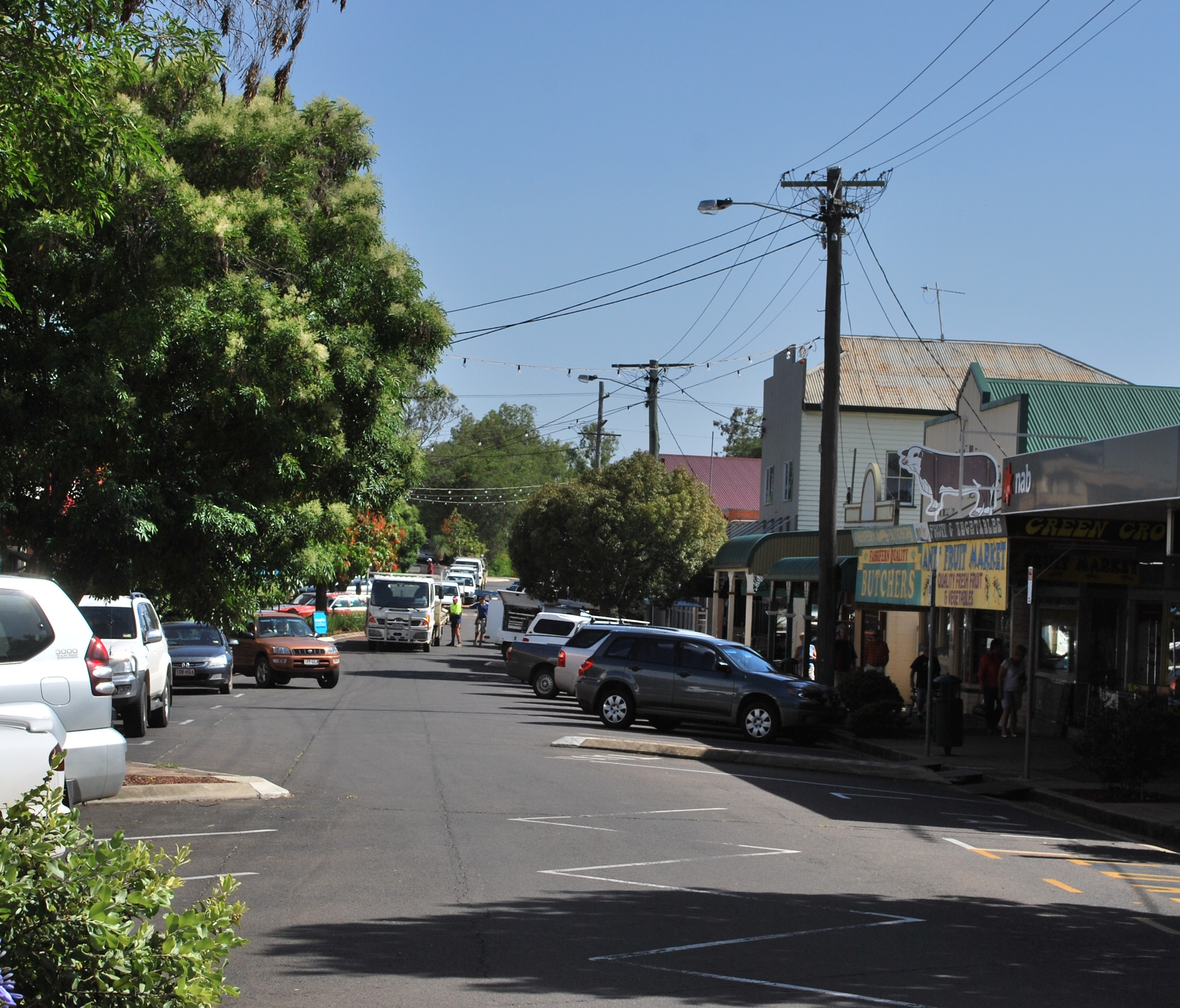
Main Street, Boonah, 2008

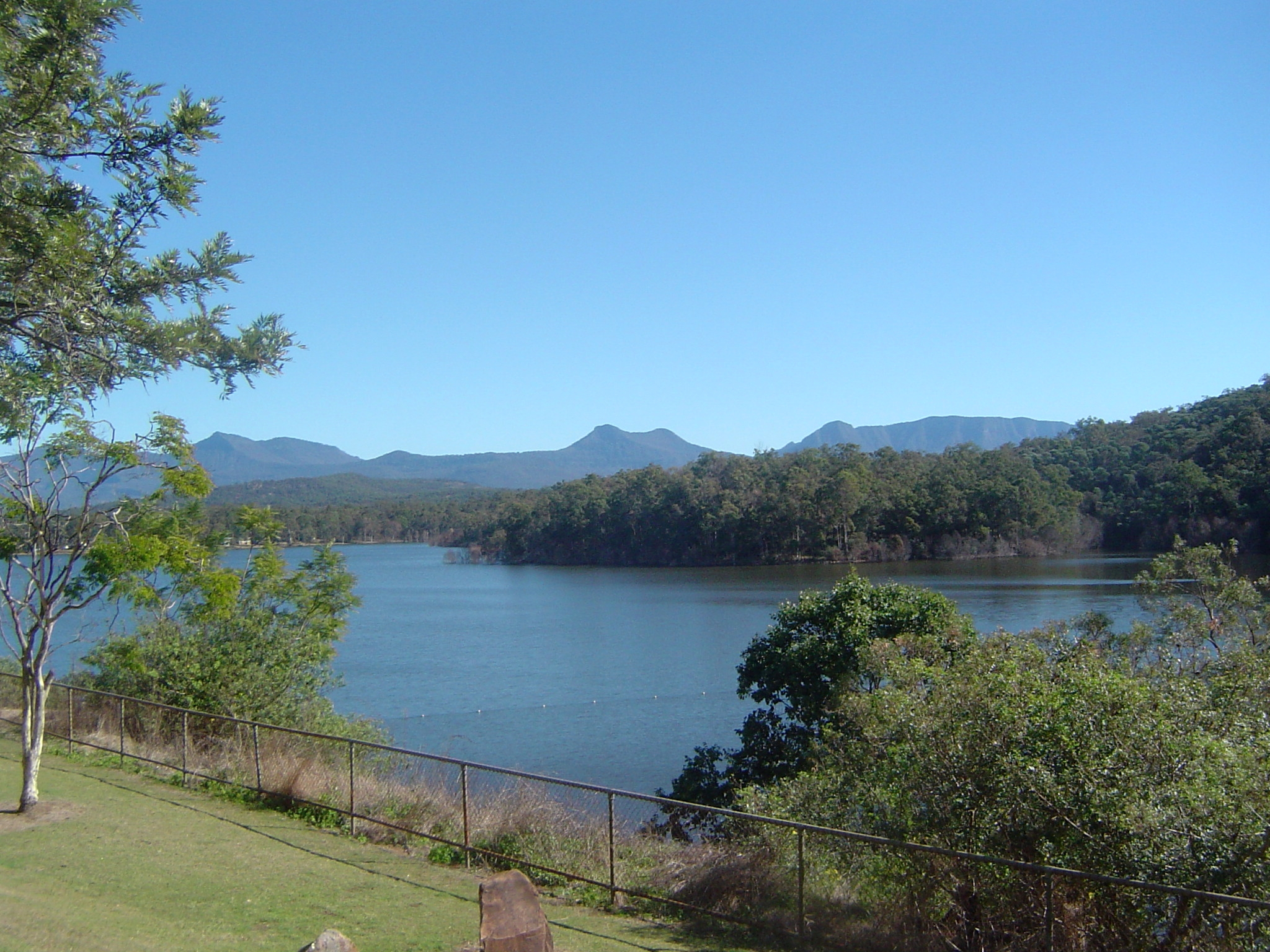
Moogerah Dam and Main Range, 2011

The Scenic Rim Region includes the following settlements:

Beaudesert area:

- Beaudesert
- Beechmont
- Benobble
- Biddaddaba
- Birnam
- Boyland
- Bromelton
- Canungra
- Christmas Creek
- Cryna
- Gleneagle
- Hillview
- Innisplain
- Josephville
- Kerry
- Kooralbyn
- Lamington
- Lamington National Park
- Laravale
- Palen Creek
- Rathdowney
- Tabooba
- Tabragalba
- Tamborine Mountain
- Tamrookum
- Tamrookum Creek
- Witheren
- Wonglepong

Boonah area:

- Boonah
- Aratula
- Charlwood
- Coulson
- Fassifern
- Harrisville^{1}
- Kalbar
- Maroon
- Moogerah
- Mount Alford
- Mount Walker
- Roadvale
- Rosevale
- Silverdale
- Tarome
- Templin
- Warrill View

Other areas:

- Allandale
- Allenview
- Anthony
- Barney View
- Binna Burra
- Blantyre
- Bunburra
- Bunjurgen
- Burnett Creek
- Cainbable
- Cannon Creek
- Carneys Creek
- Chinghee Creek
- Clumber
- Coleyville
- Coochin
- Croftby
- Darlington
- Dugandan
- Fassifern Valley
- Ferny Glen
- Flying Fox
- Frazerview
- Frenches Creek
- Hoya
- Illinbah
- Kagaru
- Kents Lagoon
- Kents Pocket
- Knapp Creek
- Kulgun
- Limestone Ridges^{1}
- Lower Mount Walker
- Merryvale
- Milbong
- Milford
- Milora
- Moorang
- Morwincha
- Mount Barney
- Mount Edwards
- Mount Forbes^{1}
- Mount French
- Mount Gipps
- Mount Lindesay
- Mount Walker West
- Munbilla
- Mutdapilly^{1}
- Nindooinbah
- North Tamborine
- Oaky Creek
- Obum Obum
- O'Reilly
- Peak Crossing^{1}
- Radford
- Running Creek
- Sarabah
- Southern Lamington
- Tamborine^{2}
- Teviotville
- Undullah^{2}
- Veresdale^{2}
- Veresdale Scrub^{2}
- Wallaces Creek
- Washpool
- Wilsons Plains
- Woolooman
- Wyaralong

^{1} - split with the City of Ipswich ^{2} - split with Logan City

== Demographics ==
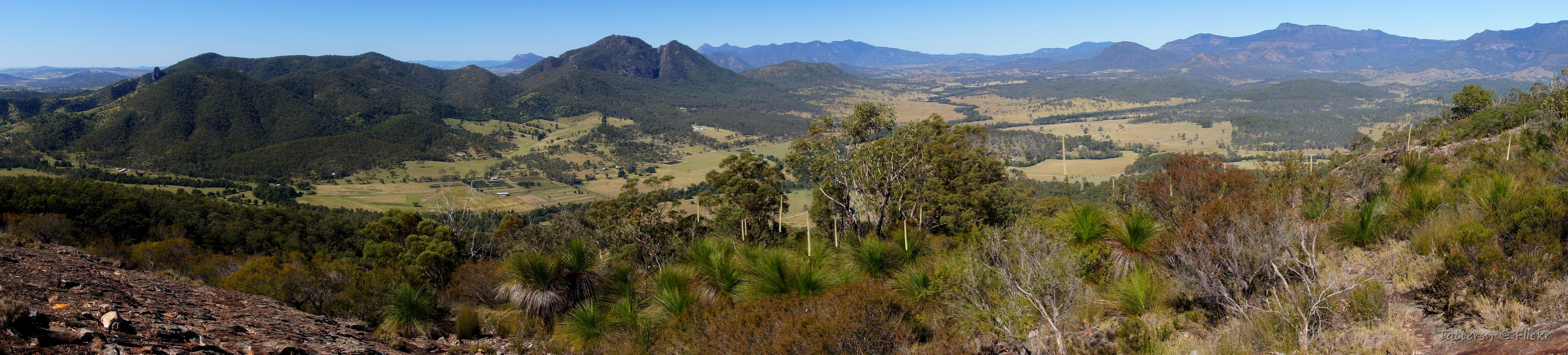
The rugged terrain around Moogerah Peaks National Park, 2013

The populations given relate to the component entities prior to 2008.

Year	Population
1986	22,992
1991	28,512
1996	32,997
2001	35,342
2006	34,659

In the 2011 census, the Scenic Rim Region had a population of 36,456 people.

In the 2016 census, the Scenic Rim Region had a population of 40,072 people.

In the 2021 census, the Scenic Rim Region had a population of 42,984 people.

== Heritage register ==
In 2014, the Scenic Rim Regional Council established its local heritage register as required by the Queensland Heritage Act 1992. In February 2015, it listed 54 places based on criteria in the Australia ICOMOS Burra Charter 1999.

== Libraries ==
The Scenic Rim Regional Council operate libraries in Beaudesert, Boonah, Canungra and Tamborine Mountain. The council commenced a mobile library service in 2008, which serves Beechmont, Harrisville, Hillview, Kalbar, Kooralbyn, Peak Crossing, Rathdowney and Tamborine.
