= Oaky Creek, Queensland =

Oaky Creek
- Suburb
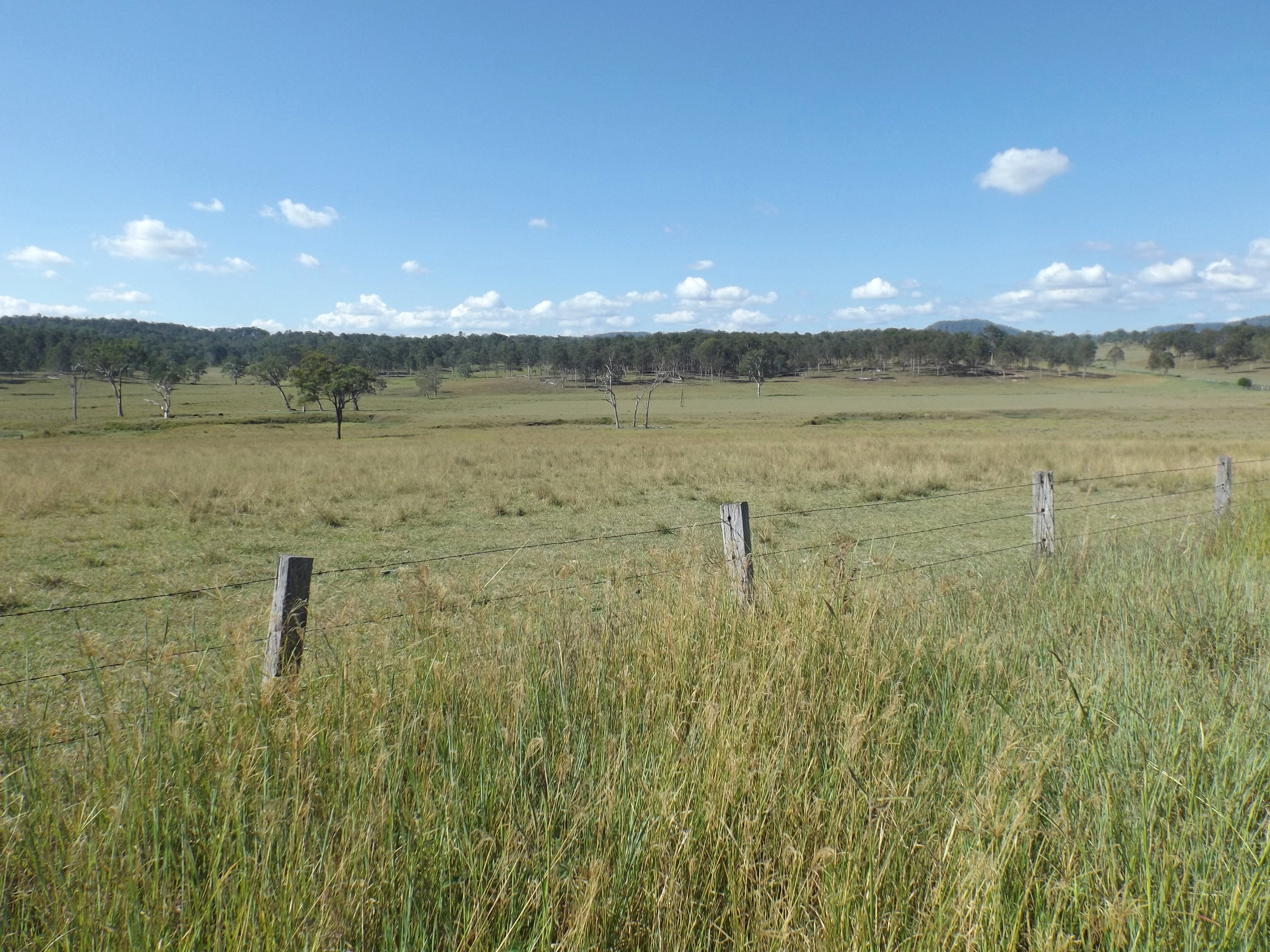
- Fields, 2016

- Interactive map of Oaky Creek
- Coordinates: 28.2036°S 152.9452°E
- Country: Australia
- State: Queensland
- LGA: Scenic Rim Region
- Location: 10.8 km (6.7 mi) E of Rathdowney; 34.0 km (21.1 mi) SSW of Beaudesert; 102 km (63 mi) SSW of Brisbane

Government
  - State electorate: Scenic Rim
  - Federal division: Wright

Area
  - Total: 53.1 km^{2} (20.5 sq mi)

Population
  - Total: 96 (2021 census)
  - Density: 1.808/km^{2} (4.682/sq mi)
- Time zone: UTC+10:00 (AEST)
- Postcode: 4285
Suburbs around Oaky Creek
Innisplain	Tabooba	Christmas Creek
Innisplain	Oaky Creek	Hillview
Running Creek	Running Creek	Lamington

Oaky Creek (previously Oakey Creek) is a rural locality in the Scenic Rim Region, Queensland, Australia. In the 2021 census, Oaky Creek had a population of 96 people.

== Geography ==
Oaky Creek is a hilly undeveloped area occupying a valley with a single creek flowing into the Logan River. Elevations in the east reach greater than 300 metres (980 ft) above sea level.

Round Hill is a mountain in the locality (28.1940°S 152.9162°E) rising to 229 metres (751 ft) above sea level.

== History ==
Timber was an important early industry in the area. There was a sawmill at Oakey Creek. This sawmill no longer exists.

== Demographics ==
In the 2011 census, Oaky Creek and surrounding localities had a population of 463 people.

In the 2016 census, Oaky Creek had a population of 83 people.

In the 2021 census, Oaky Creek had a population of 96 people.

== Education ==
There are no schools in Oaky Creek. The nearest government primary schools are Rathdowney State School in Rathdowney to the west, Hillview State School in neighbouring Hillview to the east, and Tamrookum State School in Tamrookum to the north. The nearest government secondary school is Beaudesert State High School in Beaudesert to the north.
