= Scenic Rim Local Heritage Register =

Register of culturally significant places within Queensland, Australia

The Scenic Rim Local Heritage Register is a heritage register containing a list of culturally-significant places within the Scenic Rim Region, Queensland, Australia. Under Section 113 of the Queensland Heritage Act 1992, all local government authorities in Queensland must maintain a local heritage register.

On 29 July 2014, the Scenic Rim Council established a local heritage register with 54 places of local cultural significance based on the criteria of the Australia ICOMOS Burra Charter 1999.
