= Lamington, Queensland =

Lamington
- Suburb
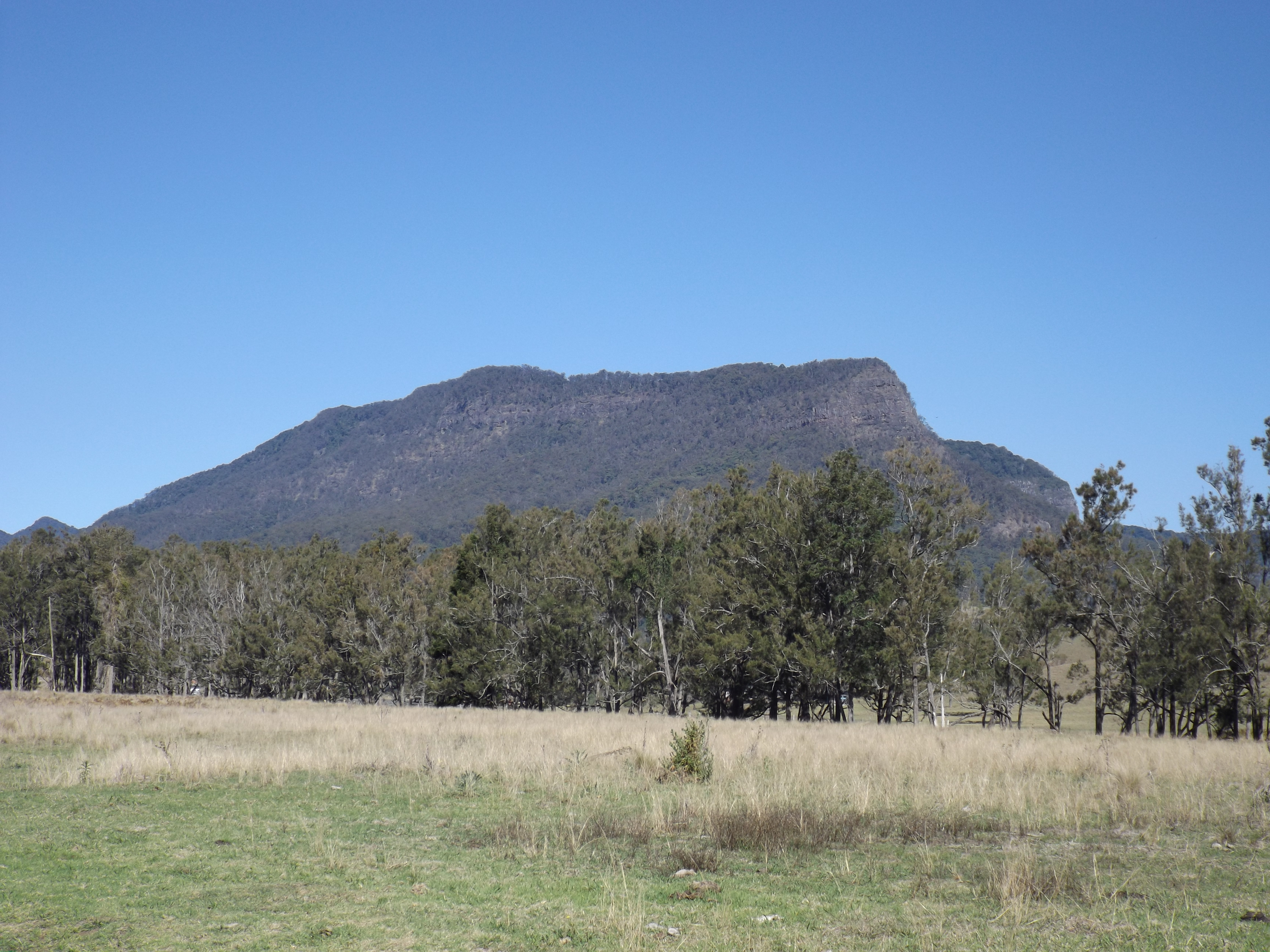
- Mount Widgee, 2014

- Interactive map of Lamington
- Coordinates: 28.2680°S 153.0244°E
- Country: Australia
- State: Queensland
- LGA: Scenic Rim Region
- Location: 42.9 km (26.7 mi) S of Beaudesert; 111 km (69 mi) S of Brisbane
- Established: 1997

Government
  - State electorate: Scenic Rim
  - Federal division: Wright

Area
  - Total: 58.2 km^{2} (22.5 sq mi)

Population
  - Total: 89 (2021 census)
  - Density: 1.529/km^{2} (3.961/sq mi)
- Time zone: UTC+10:00 (AEST)
- Postcode: 4285
Suburbs around Lamington
Oaky Creek	Hillview	Darlington
Running Creek	Lamington	Southern Lamington
Chinghee Creek	Mount Gipps	Southern Lamington

Lamington is a rural locality in the Scenic Rim Region, Queensland, Australia. In the 2021 census, Lamington had a population of 89 people.

== Geography ==
Christmas Creek is one of a number of tributaries of the Logan River which have headwaters in the McPherson Range along the border. The upper Christmas Creek valley is mountainous. Peaks at Lamington include Little Widgee Mountain, Bujera in the east while across the valley the slopes rise towards Neglected Mountain. The southern boundary follows a section of the western Lamington Plateau and Lamington National Park.

Lamington has the following mountains and cliffs:

- Buchanans Fort (mountain) (28.2839°S 153.0612°E) 817 metres (2,680 ft)
- Little Widgee Mountain (28.2681°S 153.0504°E) 759 metres (2,490 ft)
- Bujera (cliff) (28.2999°S 153.0675°E)
- Hillview Cliffs (28.2440°S 152.9738°E)

== History ==
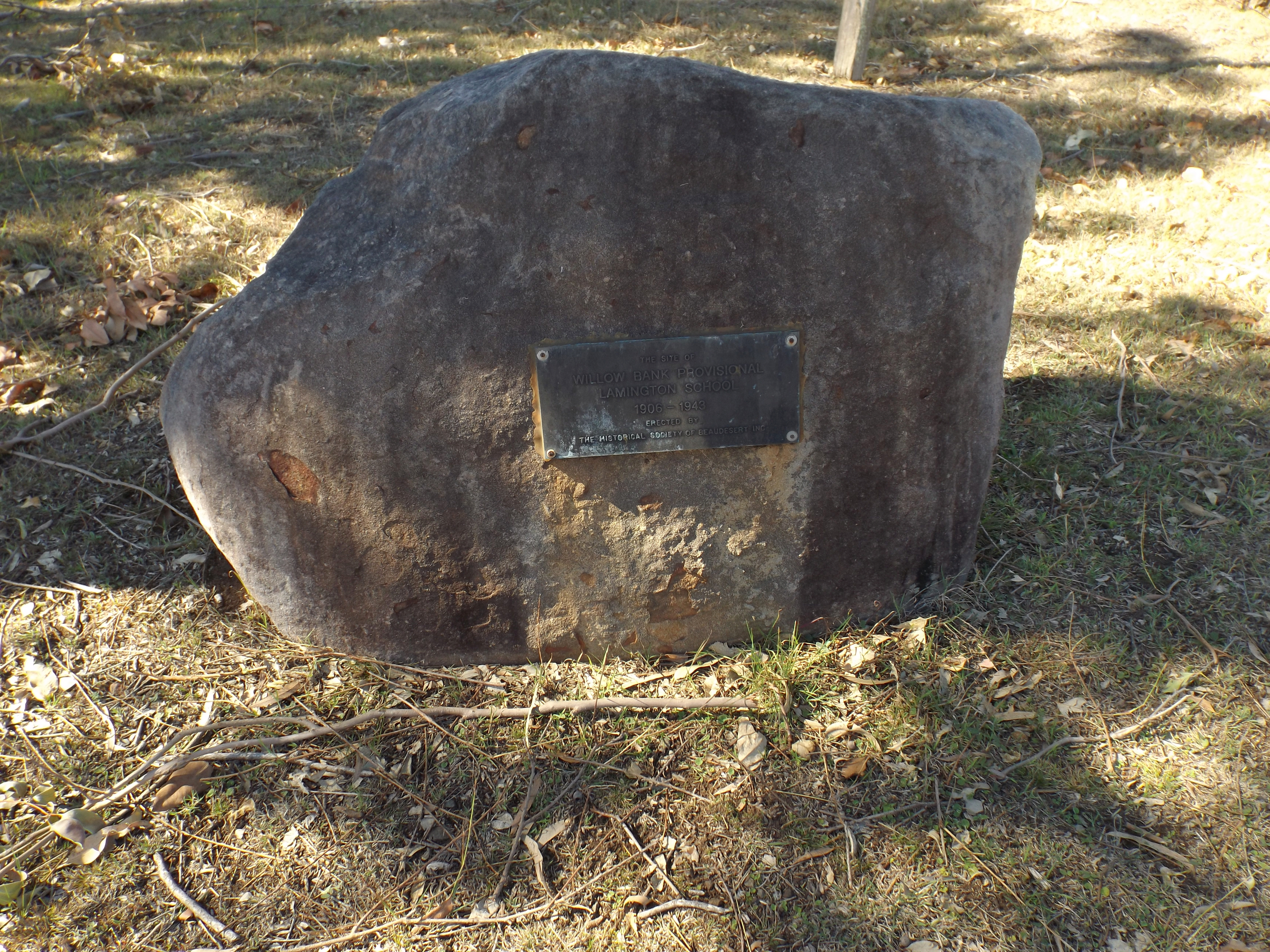
Plaque marking Lamington State School

The name Bujera is an Aboriginal word meaning "warm, love, adore, a good feeling" of the traditional landowners, the Mununjali people.

Willowbank Provisional School opened on 20 August 1906. On 1 January 1909 it became Willowbank State School. On 13 July 1914 it was renamed Lamington State School. It closed in April 1943. The school was on Kerry Road and its site is marked with a monument with a plaque.

Lamington was the terminus for one branch of the Beaudesert Shire Tramway. It operated from 1910 to 1944.

Captain Vance of the Royal Australian Survey Corp established a trigonometrical Station on Hillview Cliffs which was in use from 1924 and 1930.

== Demographics ==
In the 2016 census, Lamington had a population of 86 people. The locality contained 58 households, in which 53.5% of the population were males and 46.5% of the population were females with a median age of 48, 10 years above the national average. The average weekly household income was $1,374, $64 below the national average.

In the 2021 census, Lamington had a population of 89 people.

== Education ==
There are no schools in Lamington. The nearest government primary school is Hillview State School in neighbouring Hillview to the north. The nearest government secondary school is Beaudesert State High School in Beaudesert to the north.

== See also ==
- List of tramways in Queensland
