= Hillview, Queensland =

Hillview
- Town
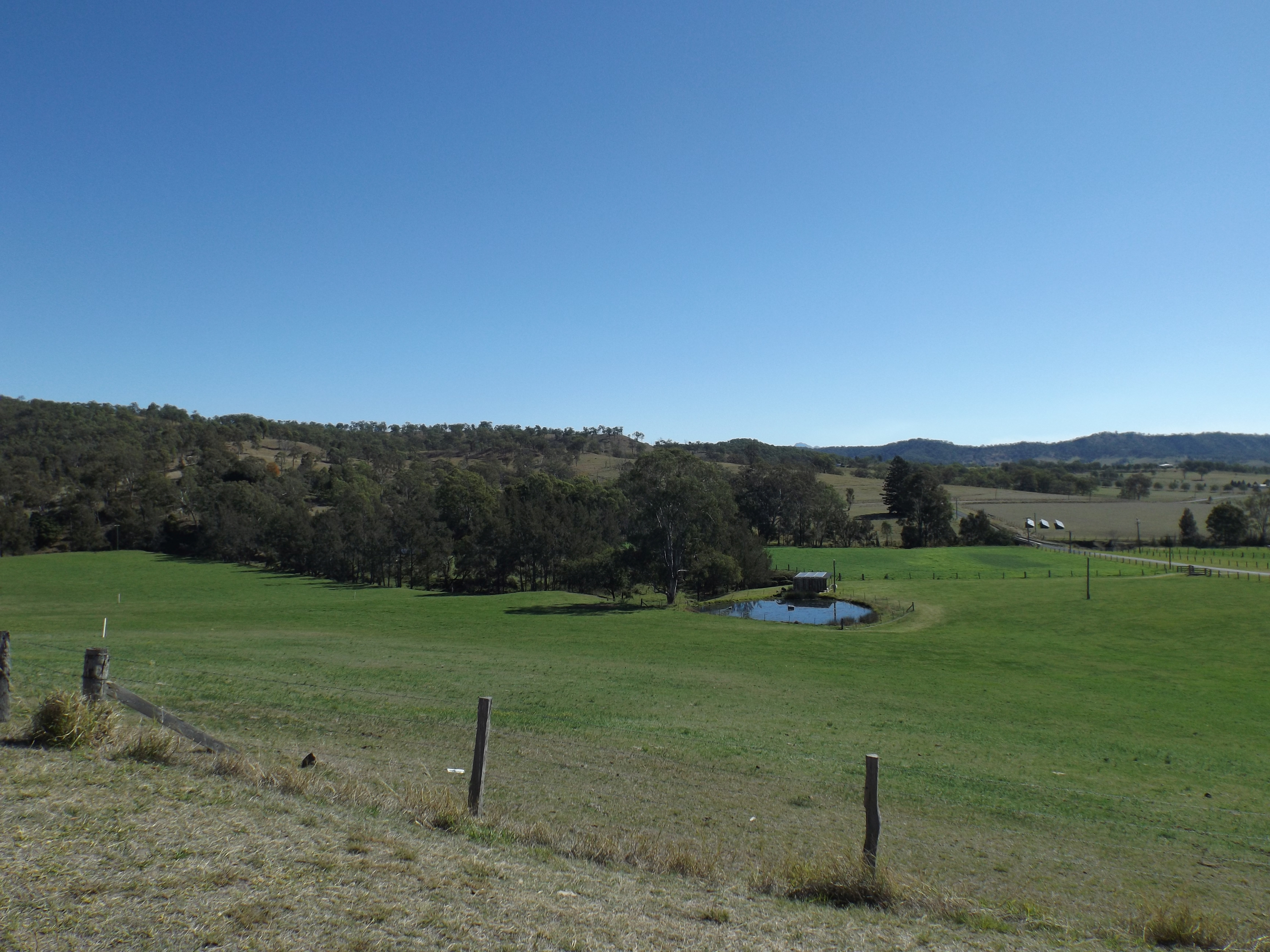
- Farms along Hillview Connection Road, 2014

- Interactive map of Hillview
- Coordinates: 28.2155°S 153.0063°E
- Country: Australia
- State: Queensland
- LGA: Scenic Rim Region
- Location: 31.1 km (19.3 mi) S of Beaudesert; 102 km (63 mi) S of Brisbane

Government
  - State electorate: Scenic Rim
  - Federal division: Wright

Area
  - Total: 19.3 km^{2} (7.5 sq mi)

Population
  - Total: 76 (2021 census)
  - Density: 3.94/km^{2} (10.20/sq mi)
- Time zone: UTC+10:00 (AEST)
- Postcode: 4285
Localities around Hillview
Oaky Creek	Christmas Creek	Darlington
Oaky Creek	Hillview	Darlington
Lamington	Lamington	Darlington

Hillview is a rural town and locality in the Scenic Rim Region, Queensland, Australia. In the 2021 census, the locality of Hillview had a population of 76 people.

== Geography ==
Hillview occupies a section of Christmas Creek valley where it is joined by Widgee Creek. Hillview's eastern boundary is marked by the high point of Jinbroken Range.

== History ==
The town was once a stop on the Beaudesert Shire Tramway.

Christmas Creek Provisional opened on 5 July 1887 (higher up the creek than a previous Christmas Creek Provisional School). In 1901, it became Christmas Creek State School. In 1914, the school was renamed Hillview State School.

== Demographics ==
In the 2016 census, the locality of Hillview had a population of 74 people. The locality contained 25 households, in which 46.5% of the population were males and 53.5% of the population were females with a median age of 51, 13 years above the national average. The average weekly household income is $1,050, $388 below the national average.

In the 2021 census, the locality of Hillview had a population of 76 people.

== Education ==
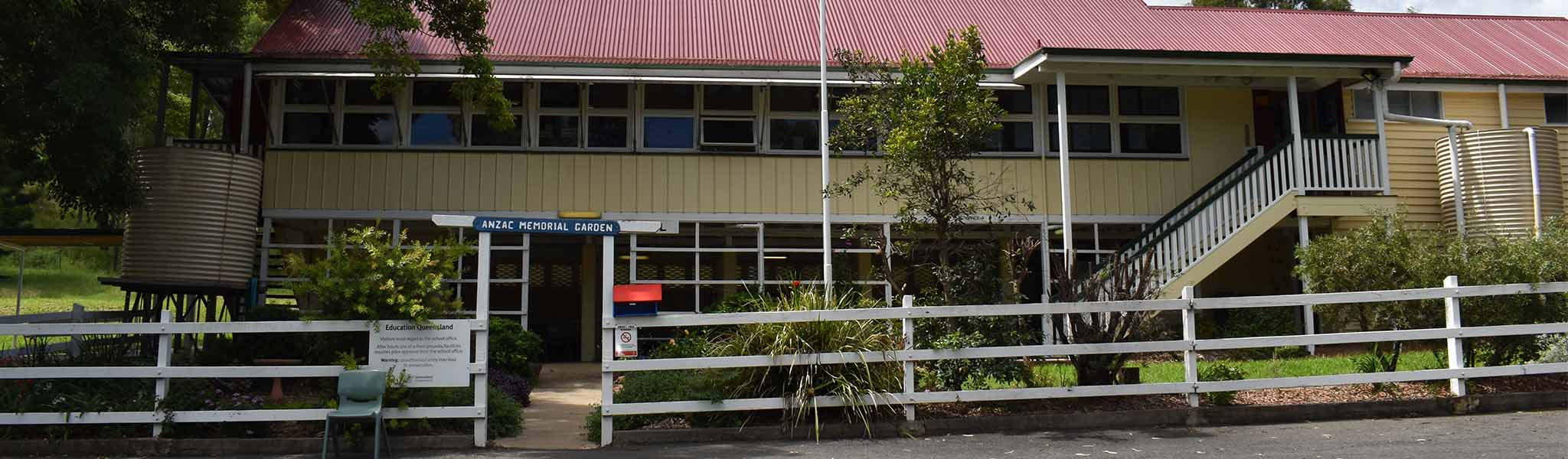
Hillview State School, 2025

Hillview State School is a government primary (Prep-6) school for boys and girls at 1623 Christmas Creek Road (28.2117°S 153.0045°E). In 2017, the school had an enrolment of 36 students with 7 teachers (3 full-time equivalent) and 5 non-teaching staff (2 full-time equivalent). In 2018, the school had an enrolment of 29 students with 6 teachers (3 full-time equivalent) and 6 non-teaching staff (3 full-time equivalent).

There are no secondary schools in Hillview. The nearest government secondary school is Beaudesert State High School in Beaudesert to the north.

== Amenities ==
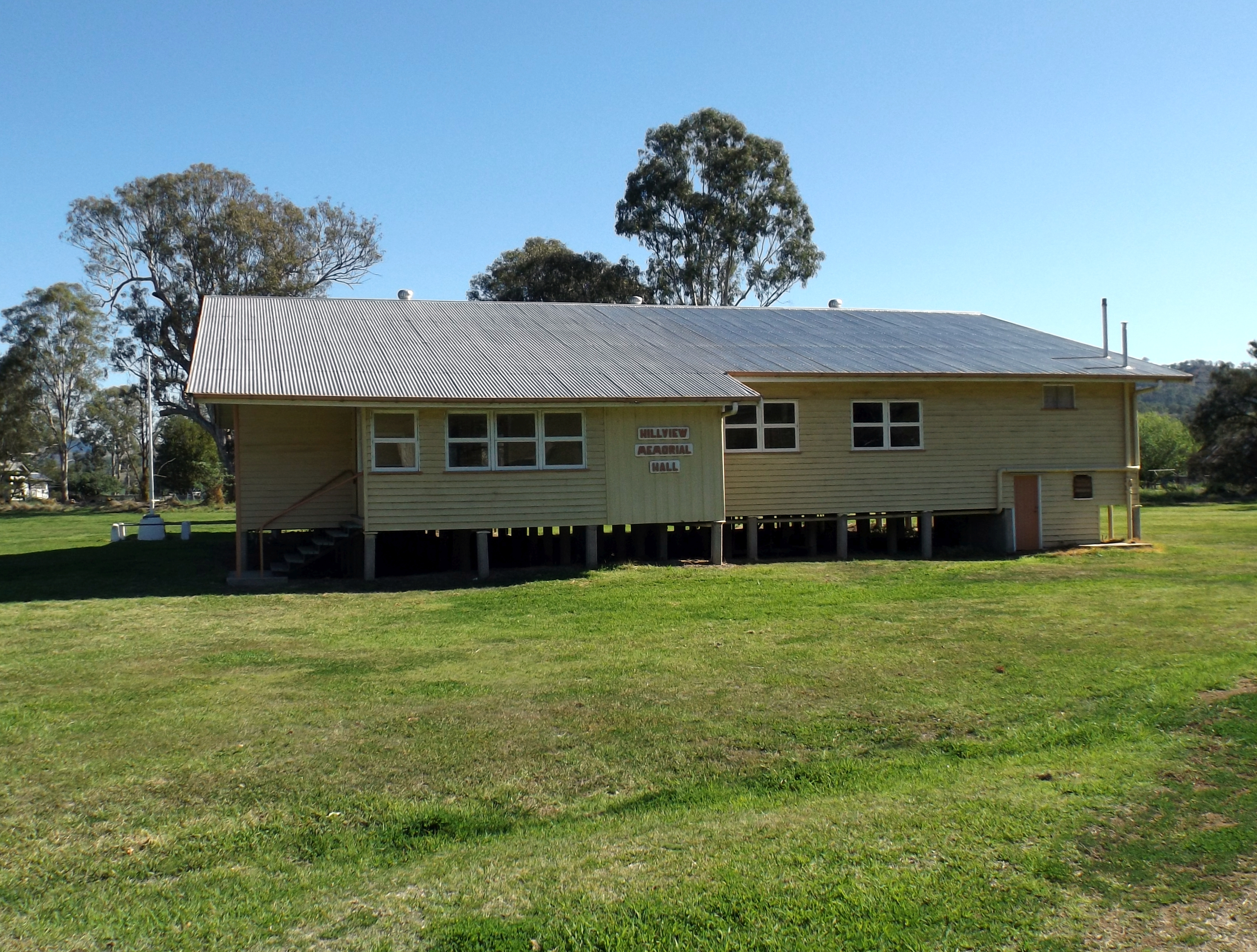
Hillview Memorial Hall, 2014

The Scenic Rim Regional Council operates a mobile library service which visits Cahill Park on Christmas Creek Road.

== See also ==
- List of tramways in Queensland
