= Beaudesert Shire Tramway =

Former tramway in Queensland, Australia

Coordinates: 28°10′28″S 152°54′13″E

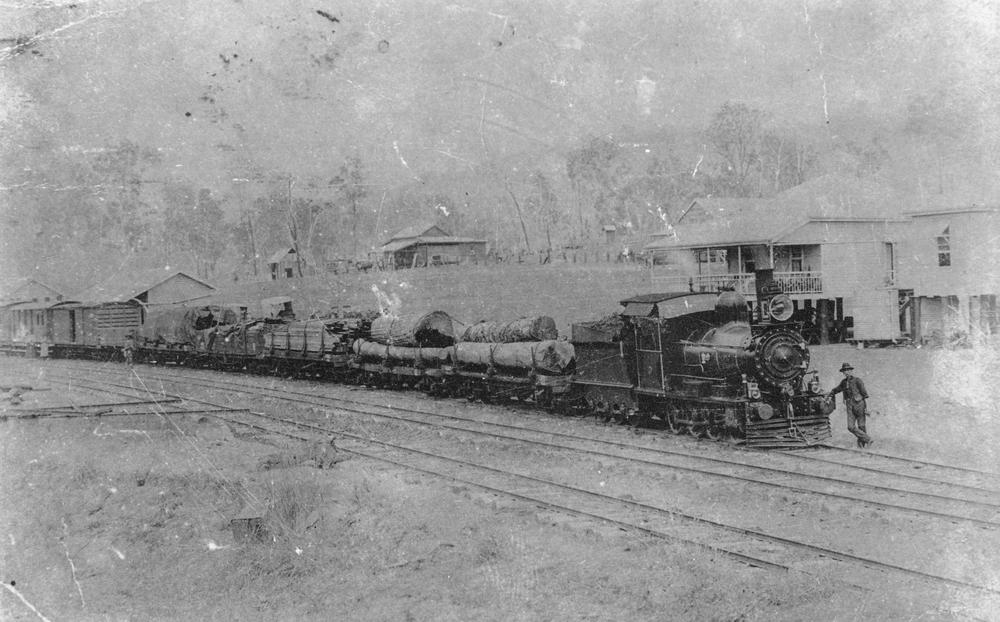
- Beaudesert Shire Tramway mixed train at Rathdowney station in 1912

Overview
- Status: Closed
- Owner: Beaudesert Shire
- Locale: Beaudesert Shire

Service
- Type: Industrial tramway
- Operator(s): Beaudesert Shire

History
- Opened: 10 October 1903; 121 years ago
- Closed: 30 September 1944; 80 years ago

Technical
- Track length: 39.36 mi (63.34 km)
- Track gauge: 1,067 mm (3 ft 6 in)

The Beaudesert Shire Tramway was a narrow gauge tramway which operated from Beaudesert to Lamington and Rathdowney in the Scenic Rim Region, Queensland, Australia, It was one of 15 light railways built and operated by Divisional Boards and Shire Councils in Queensland. The line carried passengers and cargo. It operated from 1903 to 1944. It was initially profitable and seen as a great success for the local shire council. The tramway is credited with opening up the agricultural lands of the upper Logan River.

== History ==
The Tabragalba Divisional Board, predecessor of the Beaudesert Shire, proposed the construction of the Tramway in 1899. Approval was granted on 23 October 1901 and the Beaudesert Tramway Committee was formed on 3 March 1902.

The Tramway opened from Beaudesert to Innisplain and Lilybank (later renamed Christmas Creek) on 10 October 1903 with Sir Herbert Chermside, Governor of Queensland, officiating at the opening ceremony at Tabooba Junction. In August 1907, it was decided to extend the line to Rathdowney from Innisplain. At the same shire meeting an extension from Christmas Creek was also agreed upon. In 1910, a loan for the extensions was granted.

The Christmas Creek to Lamington extension opened in October 1910 and the Innisplain to Rathdowney extension in March 1911. The total cost of construction was £92,770. In 1918, residents of Urbenville in northern New South Wales unsuccessfully agitated for an extension from Rathdowney to the west of Mount Lindesay.

Services ran between Beaudesert and Rathdowney three times per week. The main traffic was timber, dairy produce and livestock which were trans-shipped to the Queensland Railways Beaudesert line. Early traffic was promising. For example, in the 1905–1906 financial year the Tramway carried 6,712 passengers, 75,375 imperial gallons (90,522 US gal; 342,660 L) of cream, 2,854 pigs, 743 long tons (755 t; 832 short tons) of general merchandise, 260 long tons (264 t; 291 short tons) of other agricultural produce and 9,669 long tons (9,824 t; 10,829 short tons) of timber. During the 1920s the movement of timber was gradually decreasing. The tramway was used to transport postal mail to Rathdowney.

Extension of the New South Wales North Coast railway line from Kyogle to Brisbane commenced in 1926 and generated additional traffic on the tramway carrying construction materials. This led to considerable delays with services unable to run to the timetable. Rathdowney and nearby towns were served by the 4 ft 8 1/2 in (1,435 mm) standard gauge interstate line from 1930. Traffic volume on the line experienced significant decreases starting from this time. Following the "encroachment" of the standard gauge line and increasing competition from road transport, the Shire approached the Government of Queensland to take over the Tramway but the Minister for Railways declined.

With declining traffic, the Tramway ceased operations on 30 Sep 1944. The rails and rolling stock were sold, and the Beaudesert Tramway Committee was abolished on 31 December 1945.

== Route ==
See map: Beaudesert Tramway 1935

- Main line
  - Beaudesert
  - Josephville
  - Laravale
  - Tabooba
- East branch
  - Christmas Creek (formerly Lilybank)
  - Hillview
  - Lamington
- West branch
  - Innisplain
  - Dulbolla (Running Creek)
  - Rathdowney

== Locomotives ==
Image	Class	Number/Name	Wheel arrangement	Builder	Builders number	Built	Notes
	B12	35	2-6-0	Ipswich Railway Workshops	3	1878	Purchased from Queensland Railways in 1902. Used for construction of the line.
		Foden	4-2-0				Rail tractor based on a Foden steam lorry
	B13	52	4-6-0	Dubs	1907	1884	Purchased from Queensland Railways in 1921.
	B13	185	4-6-0	Dubs	1751	1883	Purchased from Queensland Railways in 1939.

== Rolling stock ==
The Tramway owned locomotives, passenger carriages capable of carrying 70 people and goods vans, with timber wagons and other rolling stock hired from Queensland Railways.

== Remains ==
Much of the Tramway reservation is now on private property, although substantial portions are visible from public roads such as the Mount Lindesay Highway. The Tramway station at Rathdowney still exists. Tramway Road at Christmas Creek is built on the former tramway reservation.

== Gallery ==
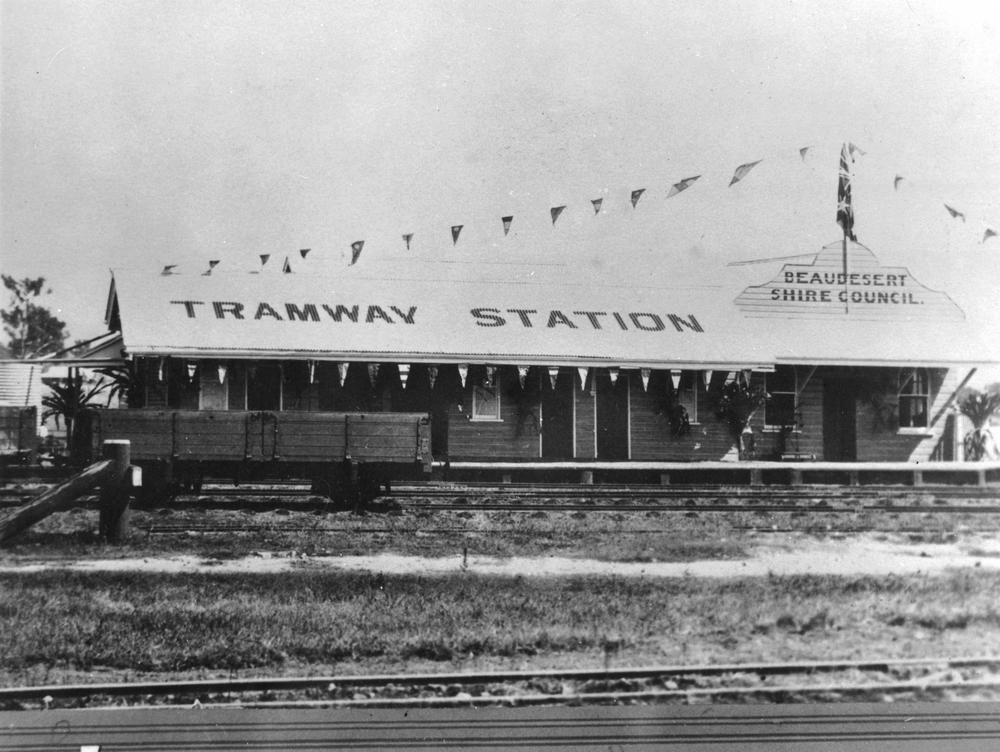
Beaudesert Tramway Station in 1927

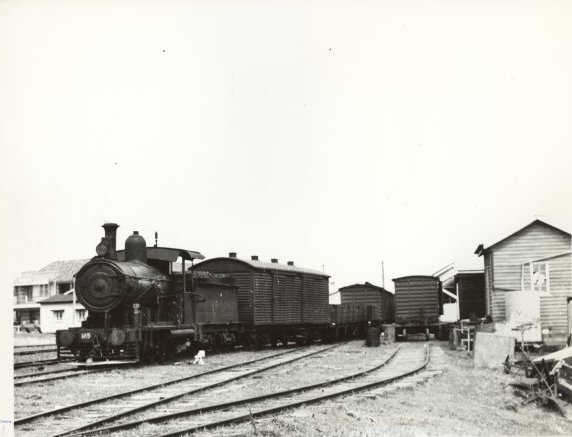
B13 class 185 at Beaudesert in 1944

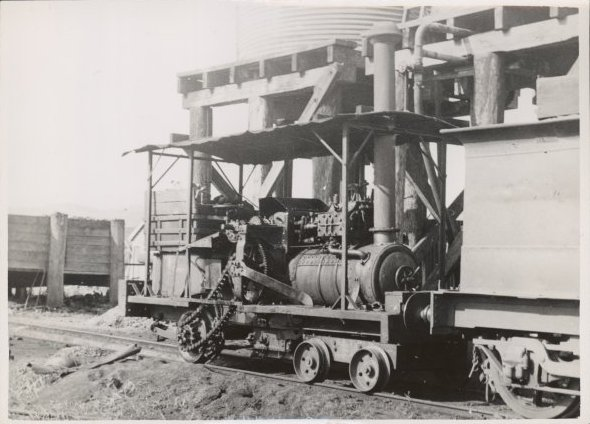
Foden rail tractor at Tabooba in 1944

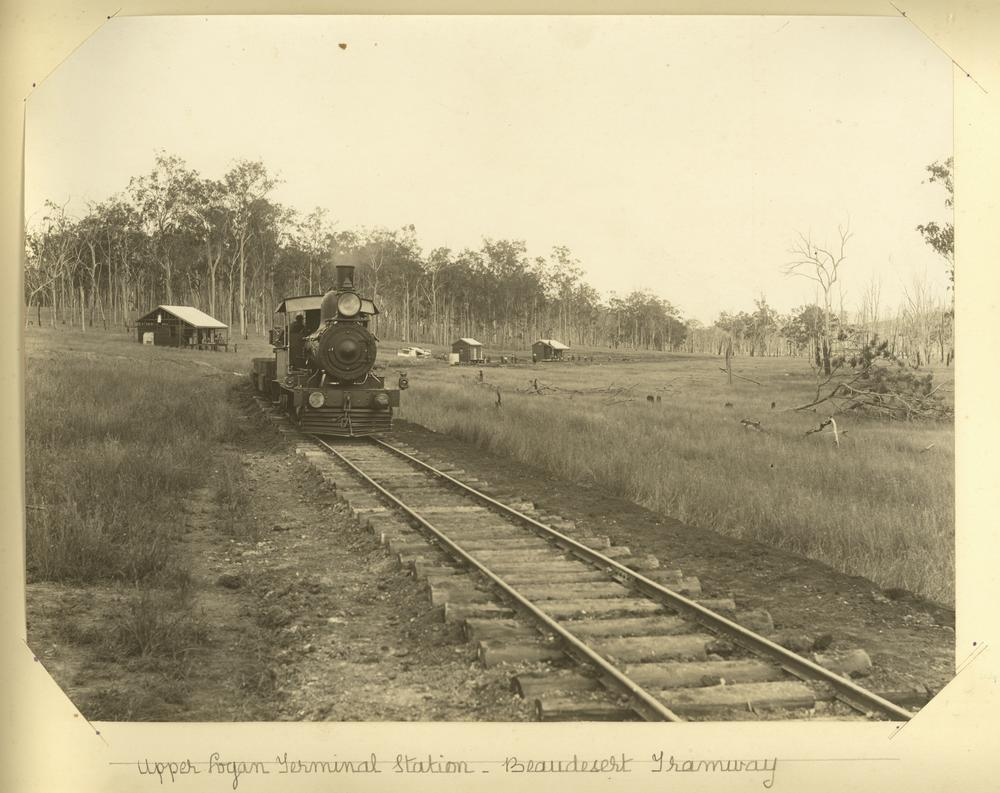
Upper Logan Terminal Station on the Beaudesert Tramway, 1903

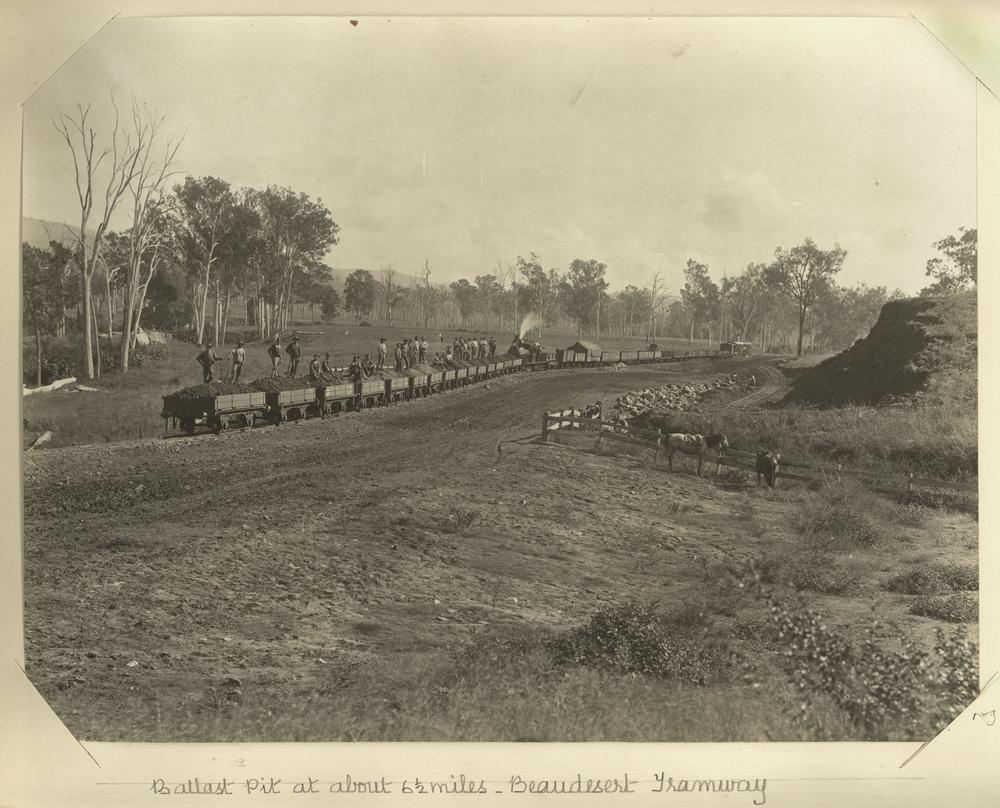
Workmen on a ballast train, 1903

== See also ==
- Rail transport in South East Queensland
- List of tramways in Queensland
