= Darlington, Queensland =

Darlington
- Suburb
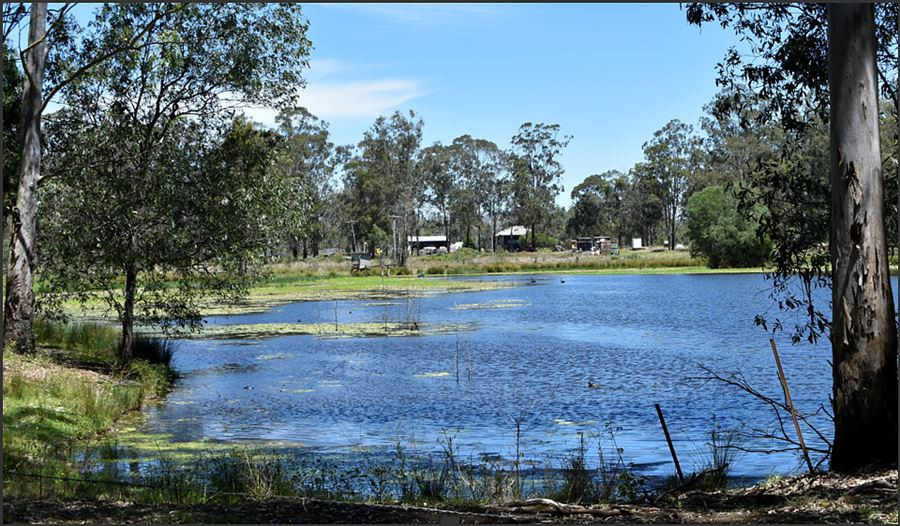
- Wetland, 2022

- Interactive map of Darlington
- Coordinates: 28.2333°S 153.0663°E
- Country: Australia
- State: Queensland
- LGA: Scenic Rim Region
- Location: 34.0 km (21.1 mi) S of Beaudesert; 103 km (64 mi) S of Brisbane CBD

Government
  - State electorate: Scenic Rim
  - Federal division: Wright

Area
  - Total: 53.0 km^{2} (20.5 sq mi)

Population
  - Total: 98 (2021 census)
  - Density: 1.849/km^{2} (4.789/sq mi)
- Time zone: UTC+10:00 (AEST)
- Postcode: 4285
Suburbs around Darlington
Christmas Creek	Kerry	O'Reilly
Hillview	Darlington	O'Reilly
Lamington	Lamington	Southern Lamington

Darlington is a rural locality in the Scenic Rim Region, Queensland, Australia. In the 2021 census, Darlington had a population of 98 people.

== Geography ==
The locality occupies a section of the upper Albert River valley where the river branches in two. The lower elevations in the north of Darlington are around 160 metres (520 ft) above sea level with the highest ridges and peaks reaching 600 metres (2,000 ft). Mount Alexander rises in the north east where a series of ridges extend from the Lamington Plateau. Here the upper and steeper slopes remain vegetated. Large areas in the south were the terrain is less rugged have been cleared. In the west the high point along Jinbroken Range forms a border with Hillview and Christmas Creek.

== History ==
Darlington Provisional School opened on 17 November 1890. On 1 January 1909 it became Darlington State School. It closed in 1914. On 30 May 1938, a new Darlington State School opened.

Readville Provisional School (also known as Widgee Creek School) opened in 1903. On 1 January 1909 it became a state school. It closed in 1911 due to low student numbers. In April 1918, the school building was relocated to Barney View.

== Demographics ==
In the 2016 census, Darlington had a population of 88 people. The locality contains 34 households, in which 47.8% of the population are males and 52.2% of the population are females with a median age of 37, 1 year below the national average. The average weekly household income is $1,333, $105 below the national average.

In the 2021 census, Darlington had a population of 98 people.

== Education ==
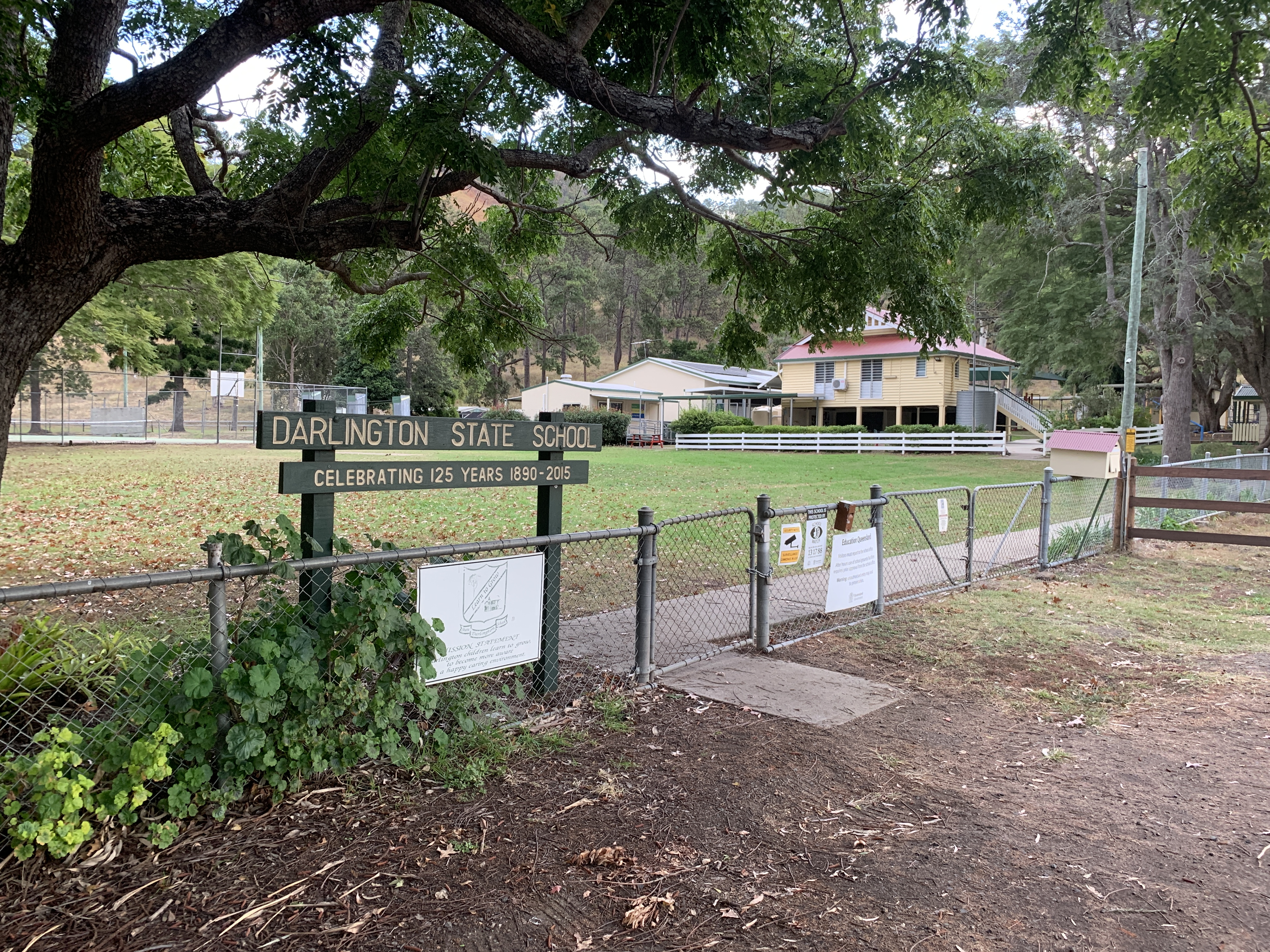
Darlington State School, 2020

Darlington State School is a government primary (Prep–6) school for boys and girls at 2744 Kerry Road (28.2056°S 153.0400°E). In 2018, the school had an enrolment of 30 students with 8 teachers (3 full-time equivalent) and 7 non-teaching staff (2 full-time equivalent).

There are no secondary schools in Darlington. The nearest government secondary school is Beaudesert State High School in Beaudesert to the north.

== Attractions ==
The areas proximity to the Lamington National Park and a landscape typical of a Scenic Rim destination attracts tourists to the area. Darlington Park on Kerry Road is a privately run camping ground. Several other properties offer bed and breakfast, homestead and cottage accommodation.

== See also ==
- Electoral district of Darlington
