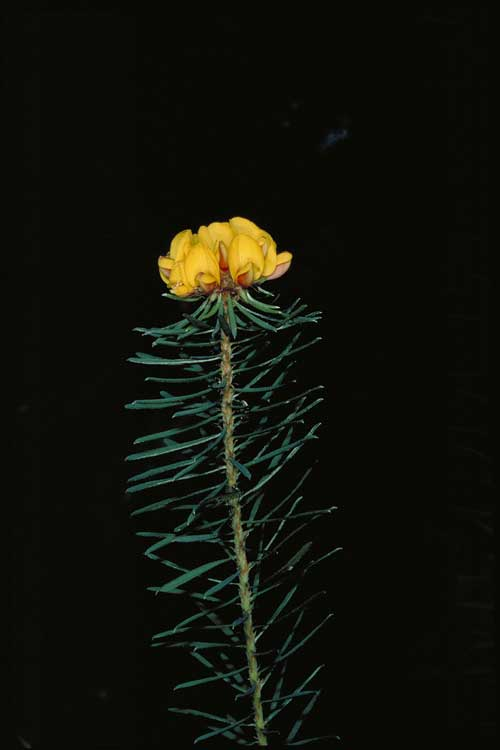
- In the Australian National Botanic Gardens

Scientific classification
- Kingdom: Plantae
- Clade: Tracheophytes
- Clade: Angiosperms
- Clade: Eudicots
- Clade: Rosids
- Order: Fabales
- Family: Fabaceae
- Subfamily: Faboideae
- Genus: Pultenaea
- Species: P. whiteana

Binomial name
- Pultenaea whiteana S.T.Blake

= Pultenaea whiteana =

Species of flowering plant

Pultenaea whiteana is a species of flowering plant in the family Fabaceae and is endemic to a restricted area of south-eastern Queensland. It is an erect shrub with linear leaves and yellow to orange flowers.

== Description ==
Pultenaea whiteana is an erect shrub that typically grows to a height of 0.5–1 m (1 ft 8 in – 3 ft 3 in) and has sparsely hairy foliage. The leaves are arranged alternately, linear, 6.2–10 mm (0.24–0.39 in) long and 0.8–1 mm (0.031–0.039 in) wide with the edges sometimes curving upwards and with stipules 2.8–5 mm (0.11–0.20 in) long at the base. The flowers are arranged in dense clusters with leaf-like bracts at the base and three-lobed bracteoles 3.5–5.0 mm (0.14–0.20 in) long. The sepals are 6.0–6.5 mm (0.24–0.26 in) long and the petals are yellow to orange. The standard is 10.5–12.5 mm (0.41–0.49 in) long, the wings 5–12 mm (0.20–0.47 in) long and the keel 8–12 mm (0.31–0.47 in) long. Flowering occurs from August to January and the fruit is a pod 5–6 mm (0.20–0.24 in) long.

== Taxonomy and naming ==
Pultenaea whiteana was first formally described in 1951 by Stanley Thatcher Blake in The Queensland Naturalist from specimens he collected on Mount Maroon in "more or less heath-like vegetation on the upper rocky slopes" in 1948. The specific epithet (whiteana) honours Cyril Tenison White.

== Distribution and habitat ==
This species of pea grows in heath, forest understorey and on cliffs at an altitude of 900–1,200 m (3,000–3,900 ft) on Mount Barney and Mount Maroon in south-eastern Queensland.
