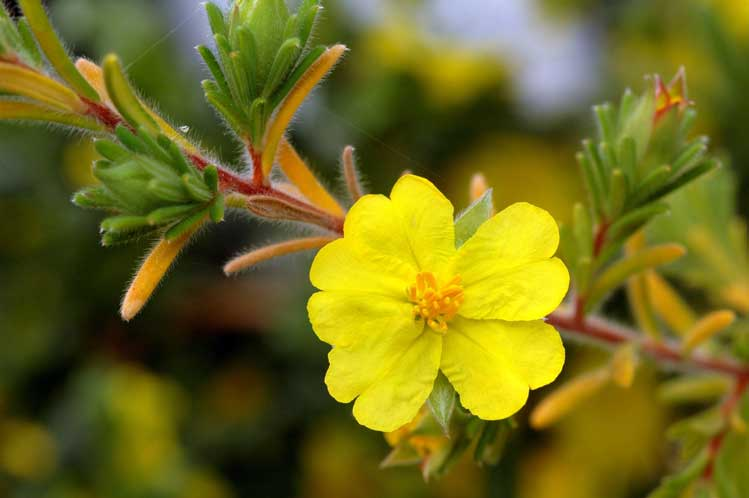
- In the Australian National Botanic Gardens

Scientific classification
- Kingdom: Plantae
- Clade: Tracheophytes
- Clade: Angiosperms
- Clade: Eudicots
- Order: Dilleniales
- Family: Dilleniaceae
- Genus: Hibbertia
- Species: H. patens

Binomial name
- Hibbertia patens Toelken

= Hibbertia patens =

Species of plant

Hibbertia patens is a species of flowering plant in the family Dilleniaceae and is endemic to south-eastern Queensland. It is a much-branched shrub with hairy foliage, linear to oblong leaves, and yellow flowers arranged singly in leaf axils with 12 to 26 stamens arranged around two carpels.

== Description ==
Hibbertia patens is a much-branched shrub that typically grows to a height of 0.6–1 m (2 ft 0 in – 3 ft 3 in) with hairy foliage. The leaves are linear to oblong, 4.5–11.8 mm (0.18–0.46 in) long, 1.1–2.4 mm (0.043–0.094 in) wide on a petiole 0.4–1.4 mm (0.016–0.055 in) long and with a tuft of hairs on the tip. The flowers are arranged singly on the ends of branches with leaf-like, linear to lance-shaped bracts 4.8–12.2 mm (0.19–0.48 in) long at the base. The five sepals are joined at the base, the outer sepal lobes 5.4–12.3 mm (0.21–0.48 in) long, 2.2–3.5 mm (0.087–0.138 in) wide and the inner sepal lobes slightly shorter but wider. The five petals are yellow, broadly egg-shaped with the narrower end towards the base, 5.6–13.7 mm (0.22–0.54 in) long and there are 12 to 26 stamens arranged in bundles around the two carpels, each carpel with four to six ovules. Flowering mainly occurs from August to November.

== Taxonomy ==
Hibbertia patens was first formally described in 2010 by Hellmut R. Toelken in the Journal of the Adelaide Botanic Gardens from specimens collected on Mount Maroon in 1973. The specific epithet (patens) means "open" or "spreading", referring to the hairs on the foliage.

== Distribution and habitat ==
This hibbertia grows in rock crevices on Mount Maroon, Mount Barney and Mount Ernest in south-eastern Queensland at altitudes above 600 m (2,000 ft).

== Conservation status ==
Hibbertia patens is classified as of "least concern" under the Queensland Government Nature Conservation Act 1992.

== See also ==
- List of Hibbertia species
