= Cotswold Cottage, Maroon =

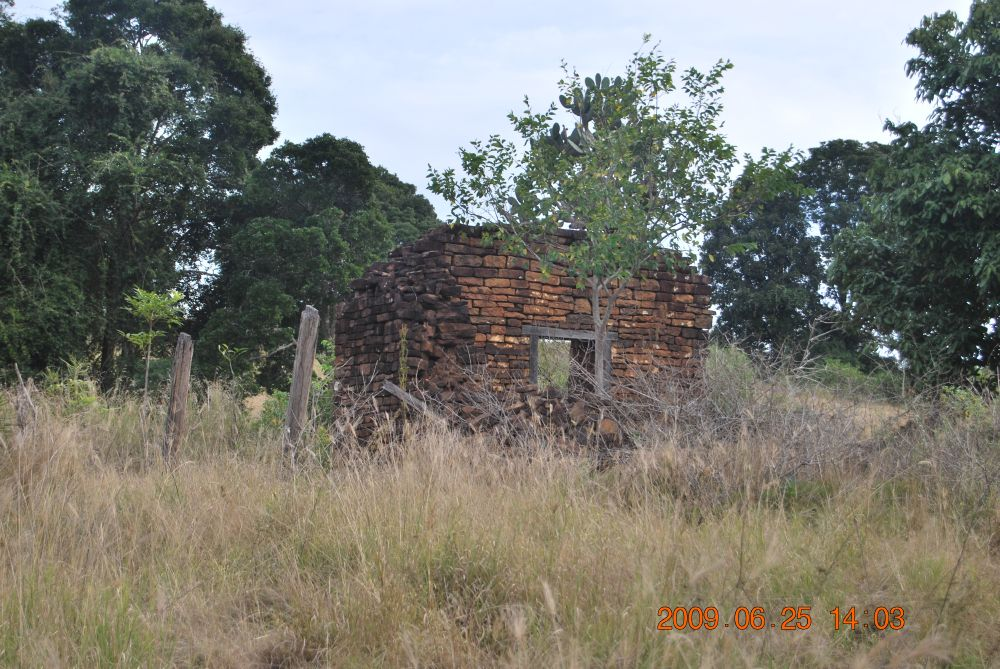
- Cotswold Cottage ruins, 2009

- Location within Queensland Location within Australia
- 28.1823°S 152.7459°E
- Location: 186 Cotswold Road, Maroon, Scenic Rim Region, Queensland, Australia

History
- Design period: 1870s–1890s (late 19th century)
- Built: 1888–1890s circa

Queensland Heritage Register
- Official name: Cotswold Cottage
- Type: state heritage (archaeological, landscape, built)
- Designated: 21 October 1992
- Reference no.: 600037
- Significant period: 1880s–1890s (historical, fabric)
- Significant components: trees/plantings, vista/s, views from, residential accommodation – main house, views to, tree groups – copse
- Builders: Frederick William Cook

Cotswold Cottage is a heritage-listed homestead at 186 Cotswold Road, Maroon, Scenic Rim Region, Queensland, Australia. It was built from 1888 to 1890s by Frederick William Cook and was added to the Queensland Heritage Register on 21 October 1992.

== History ==
Frederick William Cook built Cotswold Cottage in the Maroon district in stages between 1888 and the late 1890s, as his family's home. The former six-roomed stone and slab house is now a ruin.

According to family descendants, Cook was a carpenter by trade who in 1878 emigrated to Australia from the Cotswolds in England under assisted passage. By 1883 he was working as a joiner in South Brisbane. In 1888 he took up selection 690 (160 acres (65 ha)) in the Maroon district near Boonah in southeast Queensland. Cook's brother, Thomas, took up several adjoining selections around the same time.

The area had been long recognized for its fertile soil, but had been locked up in pastoral leases prior to the 1868 Crown Lands Act, which opened the land to closer settlement. The first selectors had arrived in the Boonah region in the 1870s and by the late 1880s Maroon had emerged as an agricultural community. Cook moved his wife, Elizabeth, and their three children from Brisbane to Maroon in June 1888. According to family descendants Cook built a slab hut close to the present location of the stone ruins to house the family while the stone and slab cottage was under construction, which also was commenced in 1888.

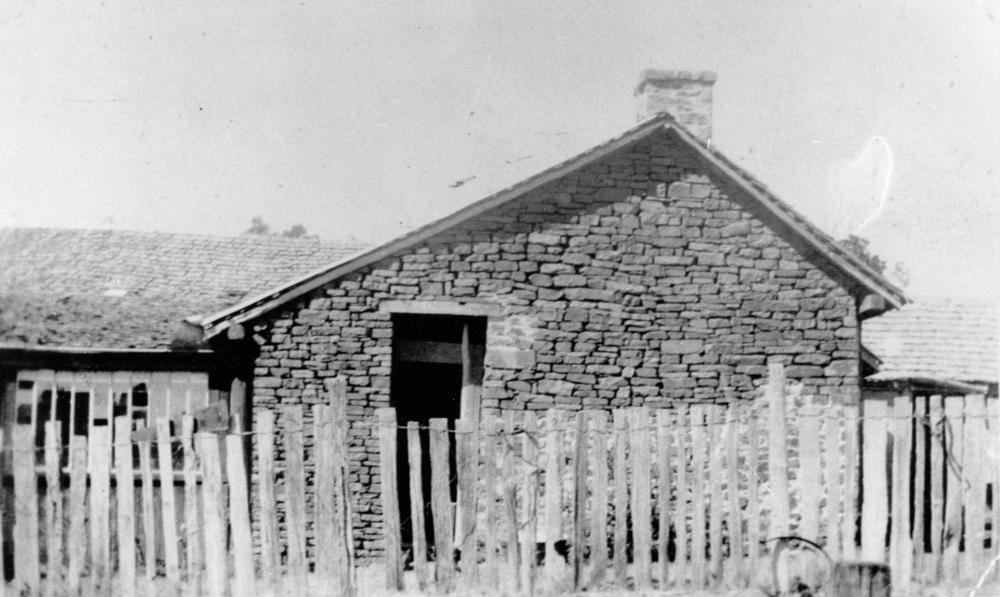
Cotswold Cottage, 1891

Named Cotswold Cottage after Cook's home district in England, the walls of the residence were constructed from iron bark slabs and stone obtained from the property. To bind the stones, he used a mortar mix of clay and cow manure. Three open fireplaces were built into the stone walls. The cottage was constructed over a number of years beginning with the southern end of the house, now completely destroyed. A Bailiff of Crown Lands report dated 20 October 1893 notes that the house comprised four rooms. Further additions were built after this date, including a semi-detached living room. The extant wall is the remains of an internal southern wall of this room. C Gillies, FW Cook's great-granddaughter, described the house in its final form:

In all the house measured 18.3 by 7.6 metres (60 ft × 25 ft). It consisted of two bedrooms, dining room, kitchen, sitting room and workshop. With the exception of the kitchen, all interior walls were painted with white wash, mixed with milk and tinted to the required colour. Fred painted a lino pattern on the floor of the dining room - this section of the house has now been demolished. The house was completely roofed with shingles, hand cut from timber standing on the property each one carefully trimmed and fitted into position. They measured 46 by 13 centimetres (18.1 in × 5.1 in) and were 1.3 centimetres (0.51 in) thick.

The most unusual feature of the stone house was its windows. The glass used in many of them consisted of 15 by 10 centimetres (5.9 in × 3.9 in) lantern slide plates. Each plate was fitted into a miniature frame and these were then joined together to form a complete window.

The above is consistent with an oral description provided by Cook's grandson, Lemuel Cook, and with the physical remnants on the site.

On his selection FW Cook cultivated maize, potatoes and fruit, but was unable to support his family solely from the property. He also worked as a builder in the Maroon district, constructing many community buildings including the provisional school and its furniture.

By February 1899 Cook was able to apply to purchase his selection and in June a Deed of Grant was issued in his name for Portion 72v, being agricultural selection 690.

The property was transferred to Cook's son, Edgar, in June 1922. After FW Cook's death in 1937 the cottage fell into disrepair. In 1954, title to the property was transferred to James Weatherall, whose family had resided in the Maroon district since the late 19th century. No further use was made of the cottage.

== Description ==
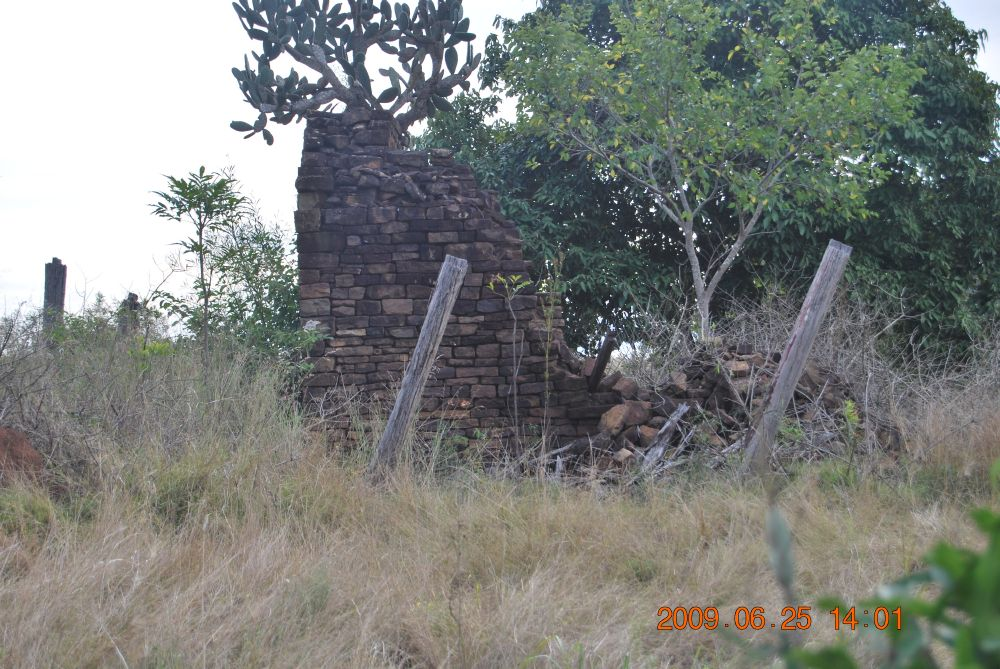
Ruins with prickly pear, 2009

The ruins of Cotswold Cottage are located in the Maroon district of Boonah Shire. They comprise the remains of a cottage constructed largely of squared rubble uncoursed.

Very little of the formerly six-roomed structure survives. Still standing is the southern thick rubble wall of a former small square room (a former living area) at the northern end of the cottage, and part of the eastern wall of this room. The southern wall is 600 millimetres (24 in) thick, consisting of two external layers of squared rubble with a hearting or core of smaller rubble off-cuts and mortar. In this wall there is a low doorway, which has a lintel of three thick timber slabs.

Parts of the lower sections of the other three walls of this room survive. The internal stones are extant to a height of up to one metre, but the outer layers have collapsed. The position of a window opening in each side wall is discernible. There are indications that the collapsed northern wall formerly incorporated a chimneystack.

External to this room are a number of hardwood posts, two each to the east, south and western sides respectively. They are tenoned at the top. Their layout is suggestive of their having supported a veranda roof extending around three sides of the living space at the northern end of the house.

South of the principal standing wall are remnants of the eastern external wall of the southern section of the cottage, reduced to approximately 500 millimetres (20 in) in height, and of similar materials and construction as the standing wall.

The cottage ruins are located on an elevated site in a cleared paddock close to Cotswold Road. Stones that appear to be part of the former walls are scattered over a wide area surrounding the ruins. A number of native trees including Flindersia australis (crow's ash) and Flindersia collina (leopard ash), some probably dating from the construction of the cottage, are growing nearby. There is evidence that some of these trees may have originally formed a windbreak near the western edge of the homestead paddock. A copse is located to the southwest of the ruins and a crow's ash tree about 50 metres (160 ft) to the north. A fallen tree is located between these. A further mature crow's ash is located to the east of the ruins close to a boundary fence. South of the property, Mount Maroon forms a dramatic backdrop to the ruins.

== Heritage listing ==
Cotswold Cottage was listed on the Queensland Heritage Register on 21 October 1992 having satisfied the following criteria.

The place is important in demonstrating the evolution or pattern of Queensland's history.

Selector FW Cook constructed Cotswold Cottage in stages between 1888 and the late 1890s. The ruins of this place are important in demonstrating the transplantation and adaptation of traditional English stone construction techniques using local materials. Cook was a builder from the Cotswold district in England and at his Maroon property he used locally obtained iron bark slabs, stone and a mortar mix of clay and cow manure for the walls of the house. He used a range of flooring techniques and finishes, including stone paving, bitumen and floorboards hand-painted to resemble linoleum. The place contributes to our understanding of early house construction techniques employed by small-scale immigrant selectors in rural Queensland, especially the use of local and recycled materials, and to our understanding of past lifestyles.

The place has potential to yield information that will contribute to an understanding of Queensland's history.

The remains of the cottage have the potential to yield further information that will contribute to an understanding of the evolution of and external influences on, vernacular Queensland buildings. This potential is enhanced by surviving documentary evidence, including a family history written by the great-granddaughter of the builder of the cottage and recorded recollections of the builder's grandson. These sources provide details of finishes and how the place functioned. This information combined with remnant fabric has the potential to contribute further to our understanding of a way of life no longer common.
