= Maroon, Queensland =

Maroon
- Suburb
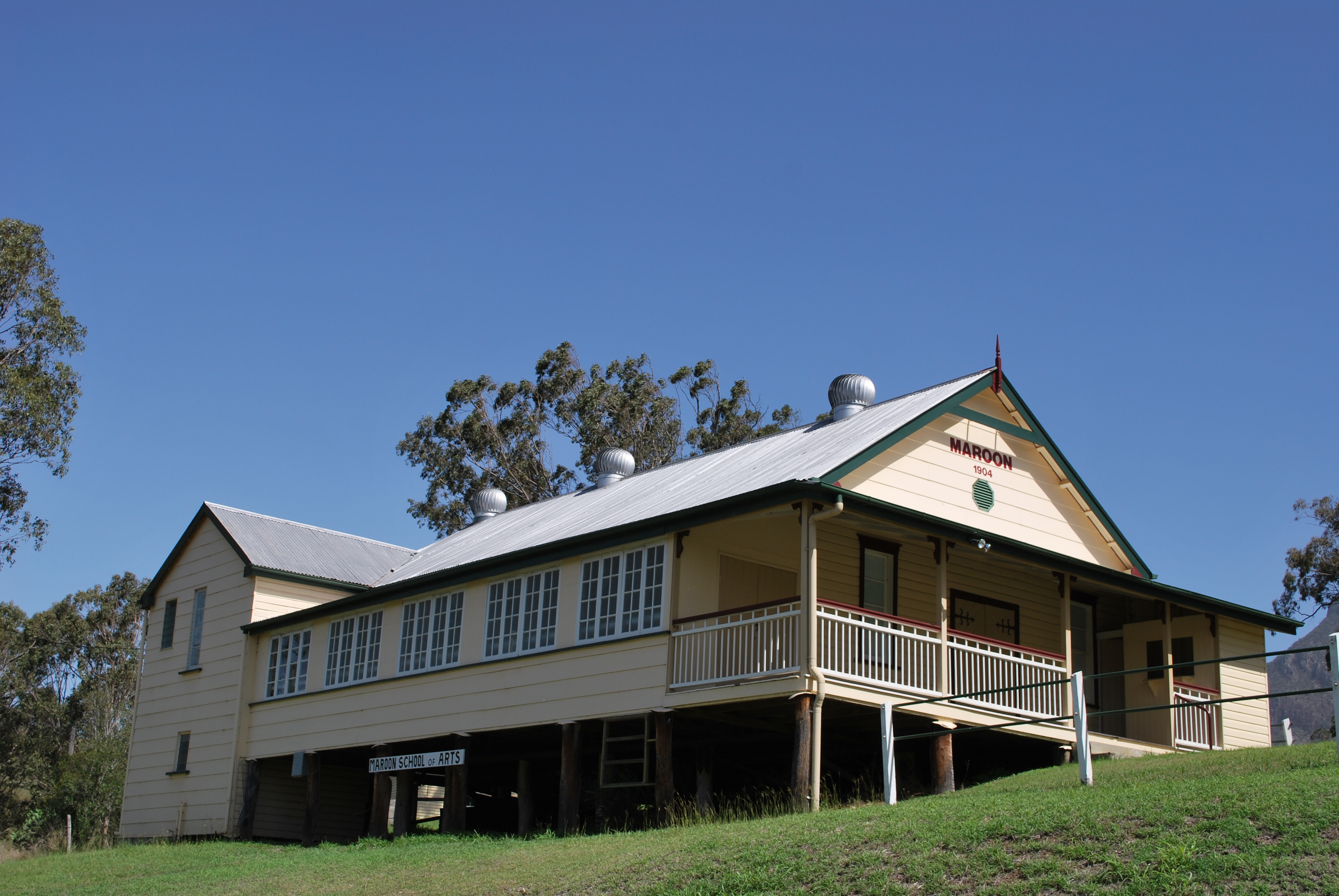
- School of Arts, built 1904

- Interactive map of Maroon
- Coordinates: 28.1919°S 152.6897°E
- Country: Australia
- State: Queensland
- LGA: Scenic Rim Region
- Location: 26.2 km (16.3 mi) S of Boonah; 65.7 km (40.8 mi) SW of Beaudesert; 74.6 km (46.4 mi) S of Ipswich; 114 km (71 mi) SW of Brisbane CBD

Government
  - State electorate: Scenic Rim
  - Federal division: Wright

Area
  - Total: 116.3 km^{2} (44.9 sq mi)

Population
  - Total: 152 (2021 census)
  - Density: 1.307/km^{2} (3.385/sq mi)
- Time zone: UTC+10:00 (AEST)
- Postcode: 4310
Suburbs around Maroon
Coochin	Cannon Creek	Knapp Creek
Croftby	Maroon	Rathdowney
Burnett Creek	Mount Barney	Barney View

Maroon is a rural locality in the Scenic Rim Region, Queensland, Australia. In the 2021 census, Maroon had a population of 152 people.

== Geography ==
The southern end of Dugandan Range (28.1246°S 152.6881°E) forms a small part of the locality's north-western boundary.

The locality has the following mountains:

- Mount May (28.2204°S 152.6708°E) 836 metres (2,743 ft)
- Paddys Peak (28.2286°S 152.6950°E) 546 metres (1,791 ft)

The south and east of the locality, including Mount May and Paddys Peak, are protected areas within the Mount Barney National Park.

== History ==
The locality name comes from wahlmoorum, which is the Yaggera language name for Mount Ballow, which is associated with a legendary giant sand goanna.

The Maroon pastoral property was established in 1843.

A cemetery at Maroon has graves dating back to 1856.

Maroon Provisional School opened on 15 July 1891. On 1 January 1909, it became Maroon State School. A new school building was officially opened on Friday 11 March 1938 by Minister for Public Instruction, Frank Cooper. The original school building was sold for removal.

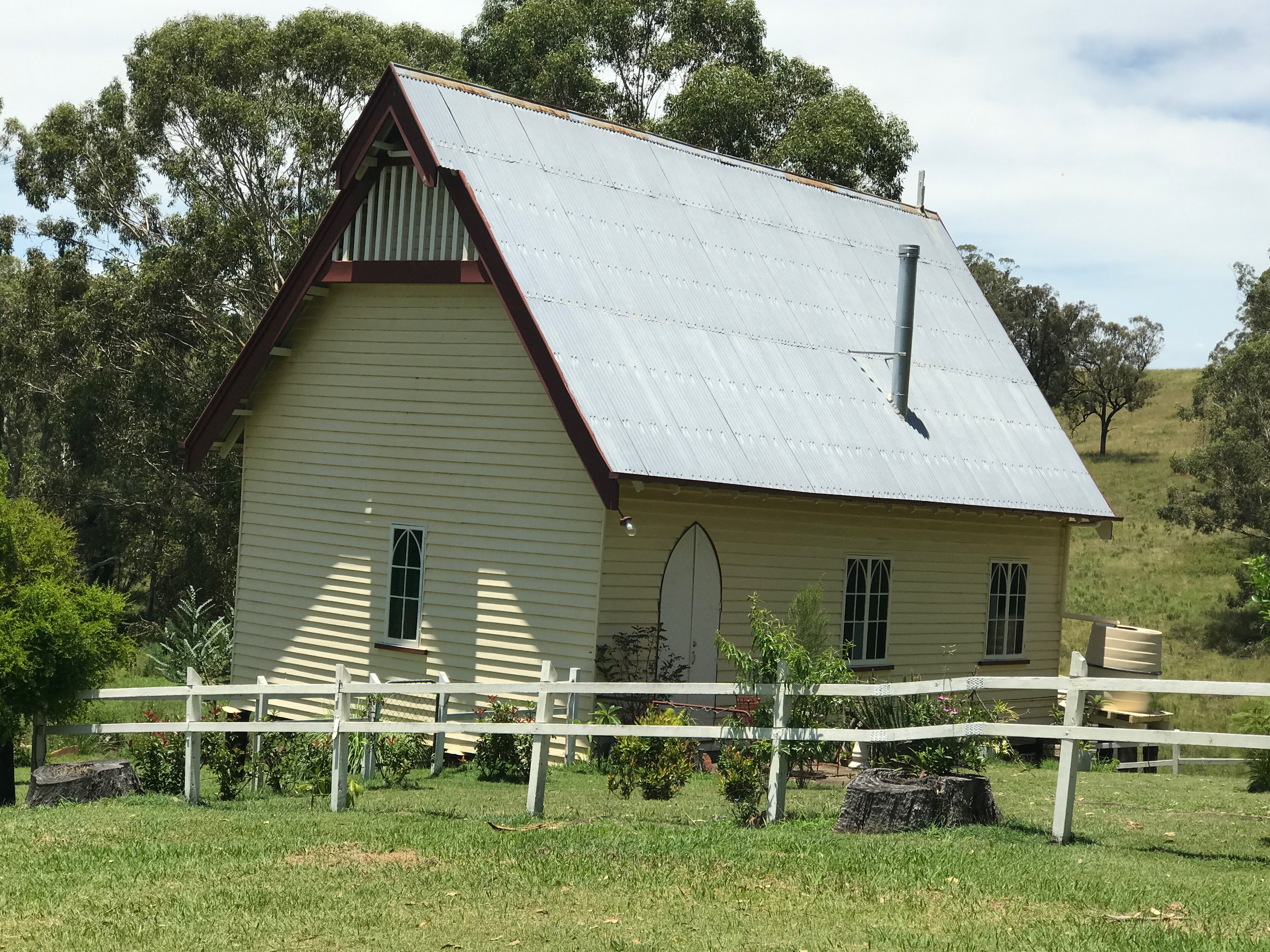
Former St Andrew's Anglican Church, 2022

On Sunday 17 November 1907, Archbishop St Clair Donaldson officially opened and dedicated St Andrew's Anglican Church. The church was capable of seating 120 people. The land was donated by J. J. Prout. The builder was carpenter and farmer Frederick William Cook of Cotswold Cottage. In 2019, the church was closed and deconsecrated in 2019 and is now used as a bed-and-breakfast accommodation. It is on Lot 2 Newlove Road behind the School of Arts (28.1733°S 152.7204°E).

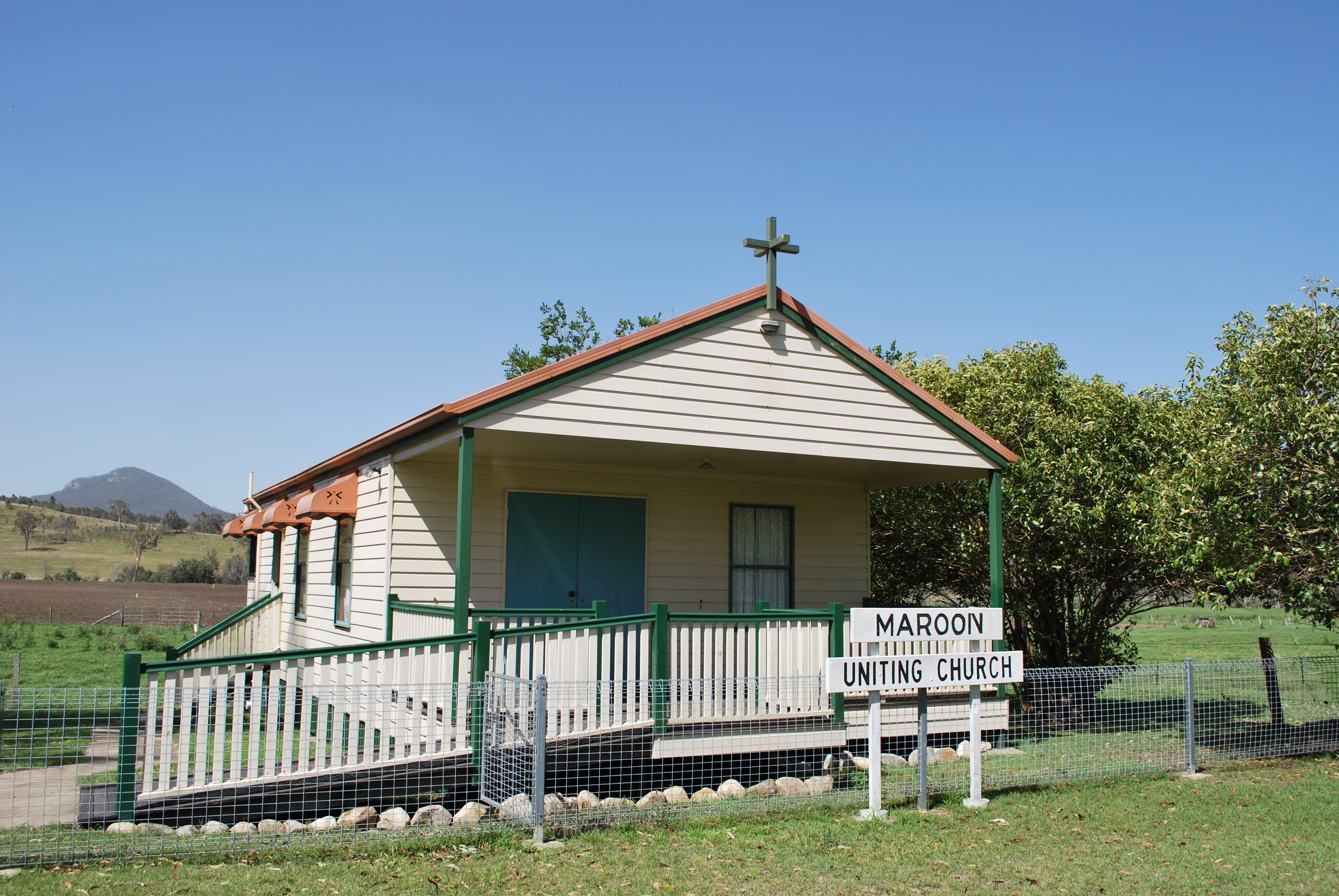
Maroon Uniting Church, 2008

In July 1913, Mr J. H. Slatter (senior) donated 0.5 acres (0.20 ha) of land opposite the school and £20 towards establishing a Methodist church. Tenders were called to erect the church in September 1913. The church was opened on Sunday 7 December 1913 by Reverend William Henry Greenwood of Boonah. It was 18 by 24 feet (5.5 by 7.3 m) with six Gothic windows and a matching door. The builder was Gordon Evans of Rathdowney It was at 2777 Boonah Rathdowney Road (28.1714°S 152.7142°E). In 1977 as part of the amalgamation that created the Uniting Church in Australia, it became the Maroon Uniting Church. Circa 1999, the church building was replaced with a new building constructed on steel stumps with hardiplank walls, timber floor, and a Colorbond roof. By August 2012, the church land and building were listed for sale and sold in October 2013 for $110,000. The church building was demolished by October 1914.

In 1914, the Maroon pastoral property was subdivided into 30 dairy farms.

The Maroon War Memorial commemorates those of the district who enlisted in World War I; it was dedicated on 21 May 1920 by General Sir William Birdwood.

Maroon Post Office opened on 1 July 1927 (a receiving office had been open from 1925) and closed in 1973.

The Maroon Dam was built in the west of Maroon between 1969 and 1974.

== Demographics ==
In the 2016 census, Maroon had a population of 149 people. The locality contains 25 households, in which 57.0% of the population are males and 43.0% of the population are females with a median age of 46, 8 years above the national average. The average weekly household income is $1,104, $334 below the national average. 2.8% of Maroon's population is either of Aborigional or Torres Strait Islander descent. 67.9% of the population aged 15 or over is either registered or de facto married, while 32.1% of the population is not married. 21.2% of the population is currently attending some form of a compulsory education. The most common nominated ancestries were English (36.4%), Australian (28.2%) and German (10.5%), while the most common country of birth was Australia (86.5%), and the most commonly spoken language at home was English (93.9%). The most common nominated religions were Anglican (36.2%), No religion (17.7%) and Catholic (16.3%). The most common occupation was a manager (25.9%) and the majority/plurality of residents worked 40 or more hours per week (58.6%).

In the 2021 census, Maroon had a population of 152 people.

== Heritage listings ==
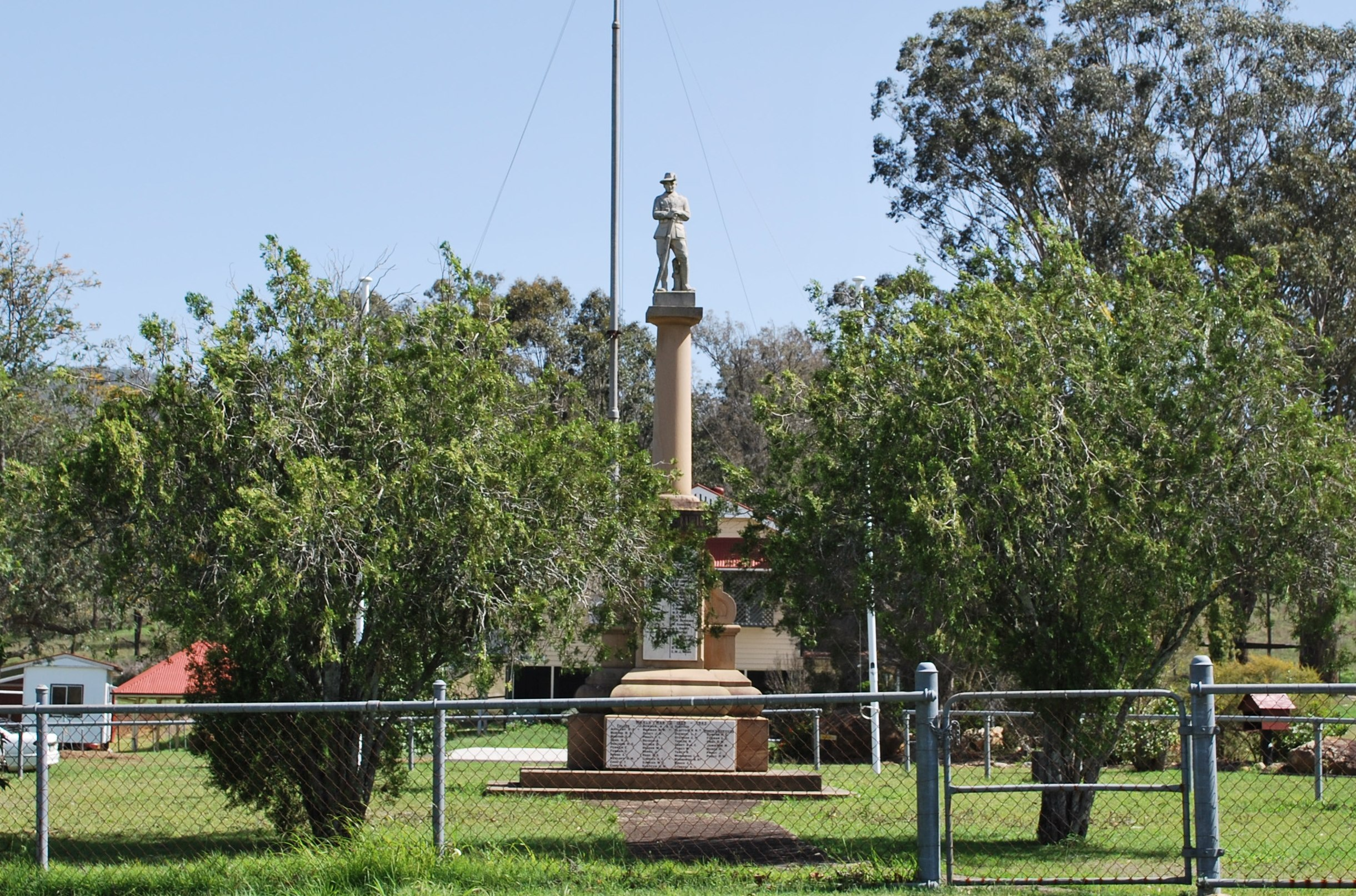
Maroon War Memorial, 2008

Maroon has a number of heritage-listed sites, including:

- Maroon War Memorial, Boonah-Rathdowney Road
- Maroon State School, 2772 Boonah Rathdowney Road
- Maroon School of Arts, south-east corner of Boonah Rathdowney Road and Newlove Road (28.1730°S 152.7199°E)
- St Andrew's Anglican Church, Newlove Road (off Boonah-Rathdowney Road)
- Cotswold Cottage, 186 Cotswold Road (28.1823°S 152.7459°E)

== Education ==
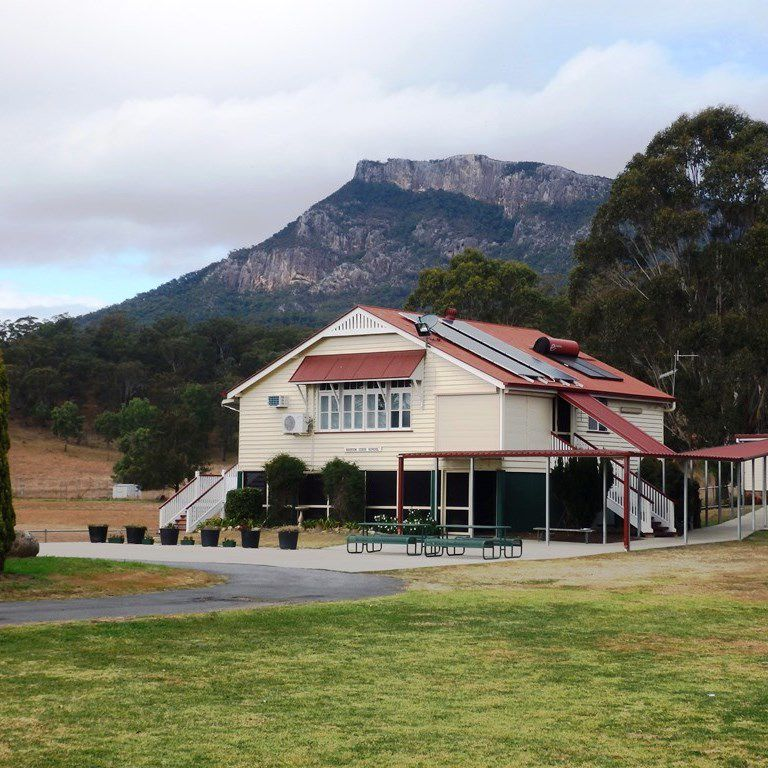
Maroon State School with Mount Maroon in the background, 2015

Maroon State School is a government primary (Prep–6) school for boys and girls at 2772 Boonah-Rathdowney Road (28.1716°S 152.7137°E). In 2023, the school enrolment of 19 students.

Maroon Outdoor Education Centre is an Outdoor and Environmental Education Centre at 123 Maroon Dam Road (28.1737°S 152.6511°E).

There are no secondary schools in Maroon. The nearest government secondary school is Boonah State High School in Boonah to the north.
