= Hillgrove, New South Wales =

Village in Australia

Hillgrove New South Wales
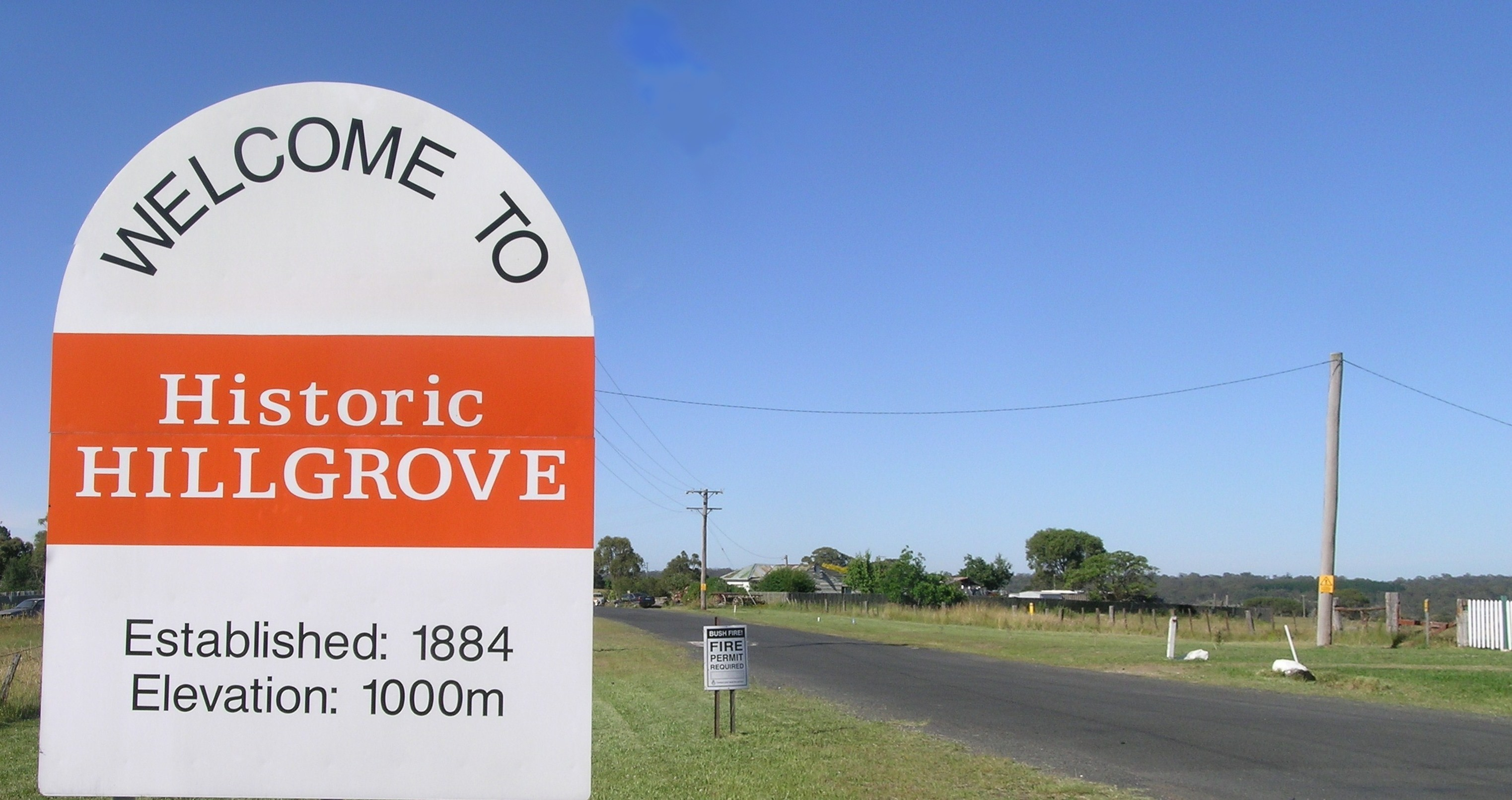
- Hillgrove welcome sign in 2008

- Coordinates: 30°34′S 151°54′E
- Population: 174 (SAL 2021)
- Established: 1884
- Postcode(s): 2350
- Elevation: 1,000 m (3,281 ft)
- Location: 506 km (314 mi) N of Sydney; 167 km (104 mi) WSW of Coffs Harbour; 103 km (64 mi) W of Dorrigo; 34 km (21 mi) E of Armidale; 485 km (301 mi) S of Brisbane
- LGA(s): Armidale Regional Council
- State electorate(s): Northern Tablelands
- Federal division(s): New England

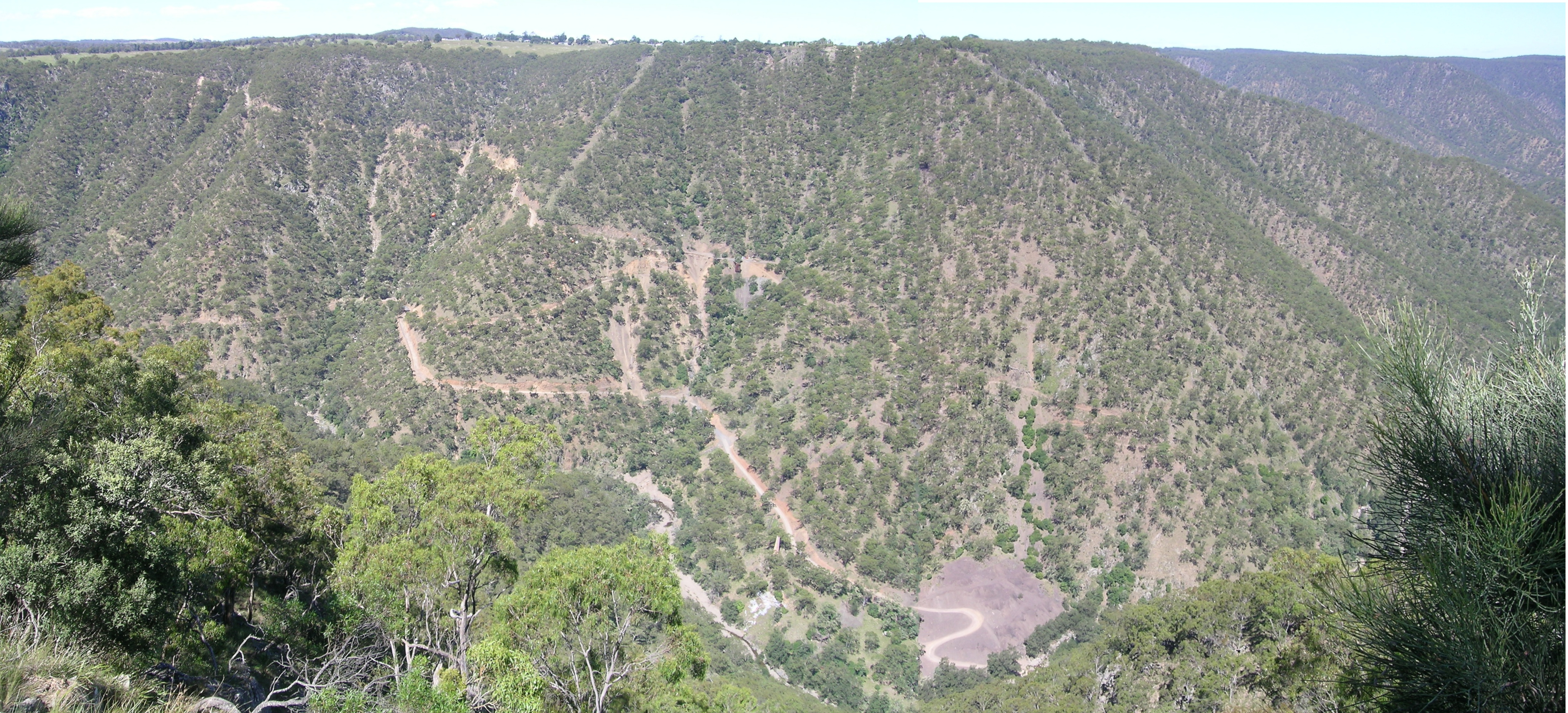
Bakers Creek Gorge, mines and Hillgrove from Metz

Hillgrove is a Northern Tablelands historic goldmining town, now a village with a population of about 95. The village lies about 30 km east of Armidale and 5 km south of the Waterfall Way, at an elevation of 1,000 m on a granite plateau above Bakers Creek, near the Oxley Wild Rivers National Park. It lies in Sandon County, part of the Armidale Regional Council local government area.

Hillgrove was one of the major gold fields in New South Wales, with a recorded production of over 15,000 kg of gold. It has also been a significant producer of antimony (14,700 tons) and tungsten (at least 2,000 tons of scheelite).

== History ==
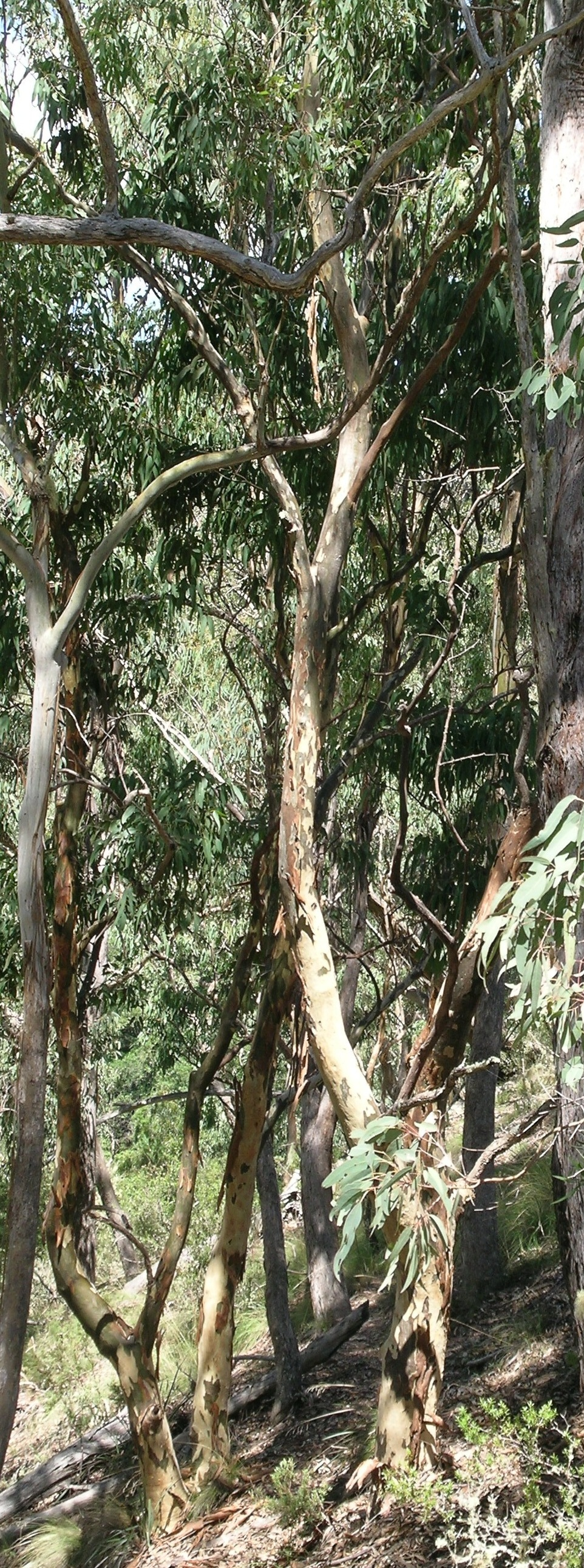
Rare Eucalyptus michaeliana (Hillgrove Gums) in centre

=== 1800s ===
The town was first known as Eleanora Township, named after the antimony mine that for nearly a decade after 1876 was the sole reason for its existence. The name Hillgrove was given to the town in 1888.

Although some alluvial gold was discovered in Bakers Creek gorge as early as 1857, it was not until antimony was discovered that important mining was undertaken in the late 1870s. The main shaft in Bakers Creek was sunk 610 metres below the surface. Tramways operated by a steam-powered winding engine pulled the trams up and down the precipitous incline to the Bakers Creek mines.

The town of Hillgrove was established in 1884 and grew rapidly during the 1880s and 1890s due to the expanding production of the mining companies. Hillgrove Post Office opened on 1 June 1884 and closed in 1979. A Hillgrove West Post Office opened in 1890, was renamed Metz in 1896 and closed in 1922.

At its peak in about 1898, the town's population was close to 3,000, similar to that of Armidale. Hillgrove then had four churches, six hotels, two schools, a school of arts, a hospital, several banks, a stock exchange, a court house, police station, a recreation ground, a technical college, debating society, a temperance league and a cordial factory. The town also printed its own local paper, the Hillgrove Guardian. In 1895 it became the first town in Australia to be supplied with power by means of hydroelectricity which operated from Gara Gorge to the west.

=== 1900s ===
Hillgrove began to decline after 1900. The difficulties and expense of its deep underground workings led investors and miners to seek more profitable ventures elsewhere. Gold finds were exhausted and antimony prices declined by the 1920s, leading to mining companies shutting down. In all, the Eleanora and Bakers Creek Mines had produced 15,600 kg of gold. Shortly afterwards, most of the town's buildings were dismantled and relocated to Armidale and other centres. By 1933 there were just 241 residents left.

Goldmining briefly resumed between 1937 and 1940. However, it was the Damned If I Know Mine, a small operation which extracted tungsten ore between the late 1930s and the late 1950s, which turned a large profit, particularly during World War II when tungsten's steel-strengthening capacity was in great demand. Antimony mining came into its own in 1969 and was mined along with gold, thus sustaining the village.

=== 2000s ===
In March 2004, the Hillgrove Gold Project near Armidale was purchased by Straits Resources, who made development plans for the area. The mine closed for months in 2009, due to global price fluctuations. It was later owned by Meridian Capital of Hong Kong, but in December 2015 it closed again, largely due to a fall in antimony prices from $8,000 to $5,000 a tonne.

=== Heritage ===
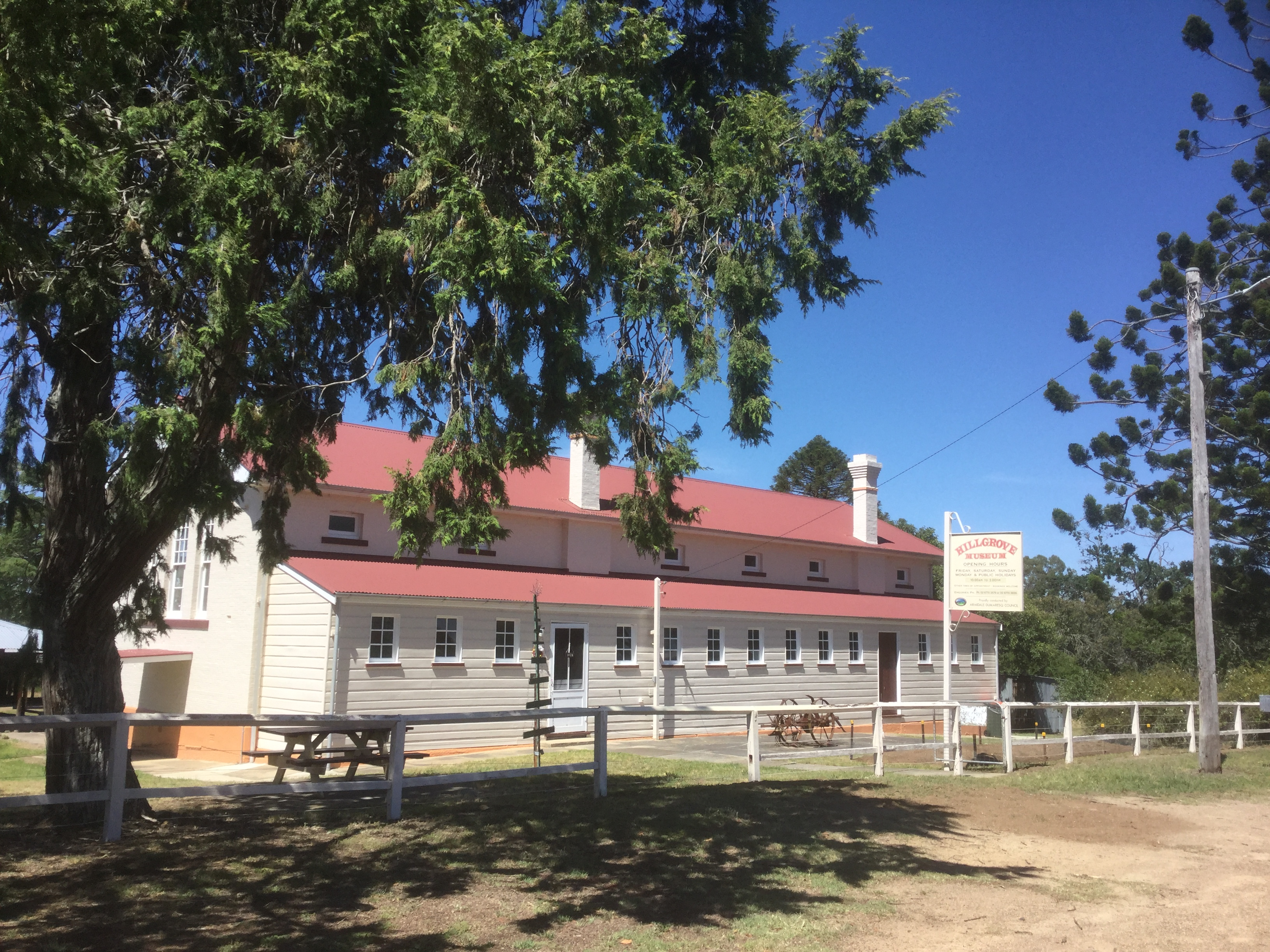
Hillgrove museum

The post office and school are the only substantial buildings which remain. The school buildings (1897) are now used to house the Hillgrove Rural Life and Industry Museum.

Hillgrove Goldmining Area and the Antimony Mine on Stockton Road have been placed on the Register of the National Estate.

== Attractions ==
Long Point campground is 18 km south of Hillgrove in the wilderness of Oxley Wild Rivers National Park. There are two posted walking tracks through dry rainforest and around the rim of the gorge offering good views over the Chandler and Macleay River systems. The overnight Chandler River Walk to Wollomombi starts here. Some rare Eucalyptus michaeliana (Hillgrove Gum) trees may be seen growing along the Long Point Road. These trees have a distinctive, mottled, greenish trunk with peeling yellow-brown bark (like jigsaw puzzle pieces). Its range is restricted to Mount Barney National Park in Queensland and in NSW to the Wyong and Hillgrove areas.

Bakers Creek Falls lookout is about 1.5 km from the Waterfall Way and provides views of the commencement of the Bakers Creek Gorge.

Metz, which was known as West Hillgrove, is situated on the western side of the Bakers Creek gorge from Hillgrove and has a scenic viewing platform at Metz Gorge. The good panorama here makes it possible to see some relics of the old Bakers Creek Mine at the bottom of the gorge, 490 m below Hillgrove. The shaft was sunk a further 610 m below the surface, almost to sea-level.

== See also ==
- Australian gold rushes
