= Philotheca obovatifolia =

Mountain wax-flower

Scientific classification
- Kingdom: Plantae
- Clade: Tracheophytes
- Clade: Angiosperms
- Clade: Eudicots
- Clade: Rosids
- Order: Sapindales
- Family: Rutaceae
- Genus: Philotheca
- Species: P. obovatifolia

Binomial name
- Philotheca obovatifolia (Bayly) P.I.Forst.

Synonyms
- Philotheca myoporoides subsp. obovatifolia Bayly

Species of plant

Philotheca obovatifolia, commonly known as mountain wax-flower, is a species of flowering plant in the family Rutaceae and is endemic to eastern Australia. It is a small shrub with broadly egg-shaped leaves with the narrower end toward the base and densely crowded near the ends of the glandular-warty branchlets, and cream-coloured flowers tinged with pink and arranged singly or in groups of up to five in leaf axils.

== Description ==
Philotheca obovatifolia is a shrub that grows to a height of about 1 m (3 ft 3 in) and has glandular-warty branchlets. The leaves are densely clustered near the ends of the branchlets and are broadly egg-shaped with the narrower end towards the base, 28–60 mm (1.1–2.4 in) long, 14–30 mm (0.55–1.18 in) wide with a prominent midrib on the lower surface. The flowers are arranged singly or in groups of up to five on a conspicuous peduncle up to 10 mm (0.39 in) long, each flower on a pedicel 5–9 mm (0.20–0.35 in) long. There are five triangular sepals and five elliptic to oblong cream-coloured petals 8–9 mm (0.31–0.35 in) long, 3.5–4 mm (0.14–0.16 in) wide and tinged with pink. The ten stamens are hairy. Flowering occurs in late spring and the fruit is about 7 mm (0.28 in) long with a beak about 3 mm (0.12 in) long.

== Taxonomy and naming ==
This philotheca was first formally described in 1998 by Michael J. Bayly who gave it the name Philotheca myoporoides subsp. obovatifolia and published the description in the journal Muelleria. In 2005 Paul Irwin Forster raised the subspecies to species status as Philotheca obovatifolia in the journal Austrobaileya.

== Distribution and habitat ==
Philotheca obovatifolia grows in heath and woodland on Mount Barney, Mount Lindesay and Mount Ernest in south-east Queensland and in Werrikimbe National Park in north-eastern New South Wales.

== Conservation status ==
Philotheca obovatifolia is classified in New South Wales as "endangered" under the New South Wales Government Biodiversity Conservation Act 2016. Only three populations are known in a small area in Werrikimbe National Park where the main threats to the species include inappropriate fire regimes, forestry activities and disturbance by feral pigs.
