= Moreton Bay (song) =

Australian folk song of the 19th century

"Moreton Bay" is an Australian folk ballad. It tells of the hardship a convict experienced at penal settlements around Australia, in particular, the penal colony at Moreton Bay, Queensland, which was established to house convicts who had reoffended in settlements in New South Wales. The song references exceptionally brutal treatment of convicts while the colony was under the command of the infamous Patrick Logan. It also describes Logan's death at the hands of local Aborigines and the joy felt by the convicts upon hearing the news. The song may have been composed at the time of Logan's death on or soon after 18 October 1830. A version entitled "The Convict's Arrival" or "The Convict's Lament on the Death of Captain Logan" has been attributed to Francis MacNamara who was transported to Australia in 1832 and was never held at Moreton Bay. It is customarily sung to the tune of the early 19th century Irish ballad "Youghal Harbour" (also known as "Eochaill"), which was used later for the song "Boolavogue", the lyrics of which were written in 1897 for the centenary of the Irish Rebellion of 1798.

Some lines of "Moreton Bay" were used by bushranger Ned Kelly in his Jerilderie Letter in 1879. The tune was adopted as Clancy's theme in the 1982 film The Man from Snowy River. It also featured in the 2003 film Ned Kelly. In the "Asparagus" episode of the Australian children's TV show, Bluey, the character Lucky's father, Pat, is heard singing the first line of the song.

== Lyrics ==
(Version as published by Robert Hughes in 1986)

One Sunday morning as I went walking, by the Brisbane's waters I chanced to stray,
I heard a convict his fate bewailing, as on the sunny river bank he lay;
I am a native of Erin's island but banished now to the fatal shore,
They tore me from my aged parents and from the maiden I do adore.

I've been a prisoner at Port Macquarie, Norfolk Island and Emu Plains,
At Castle Hill and cursed Toongabbie, at all those settlements I've worked in chains;
But of all those places of condemnation, in each penal station of New South Wales,
To Moreton Bay I've found no equal: excessive tyranny there each day prevails.

For three long years I was beastly treated, heavy irons on my legs I wore,
My back from flogging it was lacerated, and often painted with crimson gore,
And many a lad from downright starvation lies mouldering humbly beneath the clay,
Where Captain Logan he had us mangled on his triangles at Moreton Bay.

Like the Egyptians and ancient Hebrews, we were oppressed under Logan's yoke,
Till a native black who lay in ambush did give our tyrant his mortal stroke.
Fellow prisoners, be exhilarated, that all such monsters such a death may find!
And when from bondage we are liberated, our former sufferings shall fade from mind.
