= Patrick Logan =

Commandant of penal colony

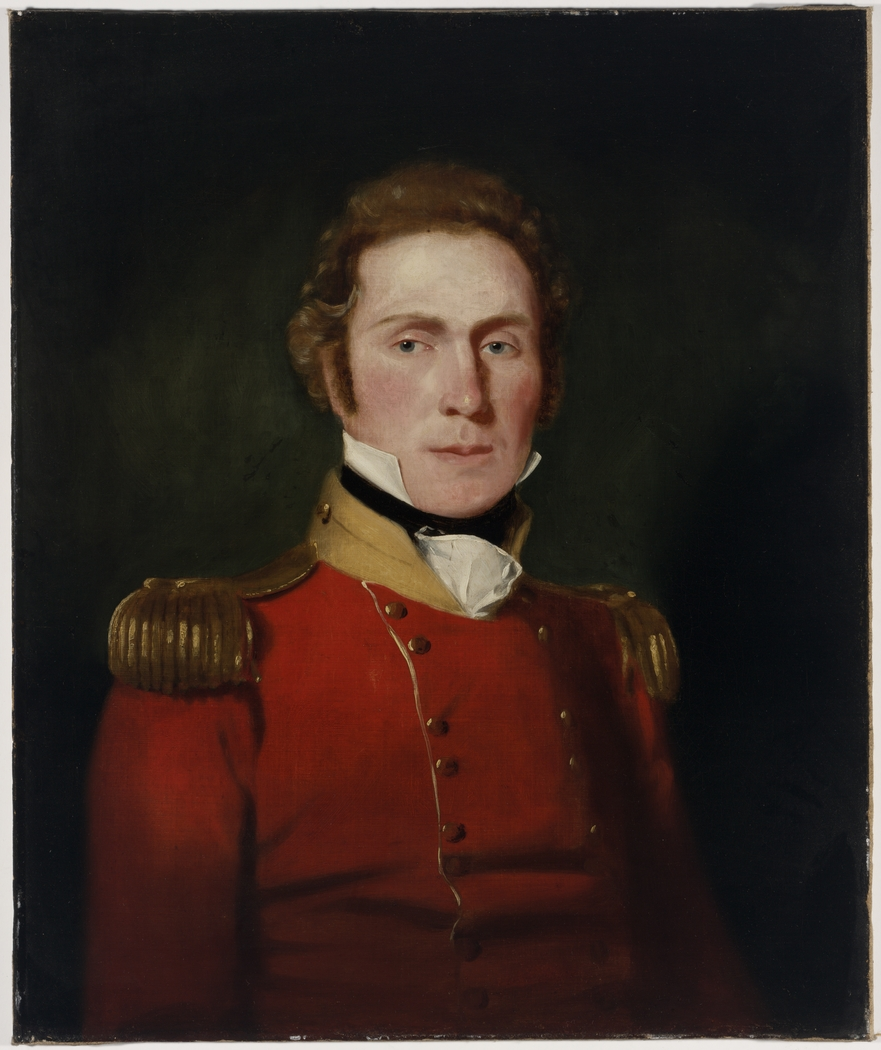
- Born: November 1791; East Renton, Berwickshire, Scotland
- Died: 17 October 1830 (aged 38); Near Mount Beppo, Queensland, Australia
- Burial place: Surry Hills, Sydney
- Spouse: Letitia O'Beirne
- Military career
- Allegiance: United Kingdom
- Rank: Captain
- Units: 57th Foot Regiment
- Conflicts: Peninsular War, War of 1812

Captain Patrick Logan (baptised 15 November 1791 – 17 October 1830) was a Scottish army officer who was the commandant of the Moreton Bay Penal Settlement from 1826 until his death in 1830 at the hands of Aboriginal Australians. As he had been despised by convicts who were brutalised at his say-so, there were rumours that convicts who had managed to escape and were camping in the bush, had attacked him as an act of revenge, but there is no evidence of this.

Logan had a distinguished military career. He was infamous as the strict commandant of the penal colony, to the point of viscous cruelty and the inhumane treatment of convict prisoners. Logan made significant explorations of what was to become known as South East Queensland. He was the first European to discover the area which became Ipswich, Queensland and some consider him to be the founder of Queensland.

== Early life ==
Patrick Logan was born in East Renton, Berwickshire, Scotland, the youngest son of Abraham Logan, a Scottish landowner and farmer, and Janet Johnstown. He was baptised at Coldingham, Berwickshire on 15 November 1791. Logan's family could trace their ancestry to two representatives who accompanied Sir James Douglas to the Holy Land in the 14th century.

== Military career ==
In 1810 he joined the 57th Foot Regiment and served in the Peninsular War. He took part in the battles of Salamanca with the retreat from Salamanca; Vittoria; Nivelle and Toulouse. Logan's regiment was sent to Canada in 1814 where he stayed for a year before joining the Duke of Wellington's Army of Occupation in Paris. He left the army during peacetime and returned to Ireland to take up farming.

Deciding that life as a farmer was not for him, he rejoined the 57th Foot Regiment in 1819. On 5 September 1823 he married Letitia Anna O'Beirne and they had two children, Robert Abraham Logan (1824 – ?) and Letitia Bingham Logan (1826 – ?). His regiment was ordered to New South Wales, leaving Cork on 5 January 1825.

Logan arrived in Sydney, New South Wales, with his regiment on 22 April 1825 aboard the Hooghly. Most of his time in Sydney was spent guarding convicts. In November, Governor Thomas Brisbane appointed Logan as commandant of the convict settlement at Moreton Bay, Queensland. It was March 1826 by the time he reached the settlement, aboard the Amity ship.

== Penal settlement ==
The settlement was quite primitive and Logan embarked on a building program, and on planting maize. During his time as commandant, the convict population there increased from 77 to over 1,000.

He designed and oversaw the construction of a hospital, a jail and a windmill. He also built a surgeon's quarters, barracks and a number of houses in his first year as Commandant. He administered crops of wheat and maize at various locations. He believed that the settlement was a place to punish the convicts, forcing them to work by hand from sunrise to sunset. In 1827 the Attorney General noted that Logan had in multiple situations ordered that convicts be subject to 150 lashes, justifying the extreme criticism bestowed on him in the contemporary ballad Moreton Bay.

== Explorations ==
He also systematically explored the outer part of south-east Queensland. He discovered the southern entrance to Moreton Bay, now known as the Gold Coast Broadwater. He named the McPherson Range, Birnam Range, Teviot Brook and Wilsons Peak. Logan discovered the Logan River in 1826, which he wished to be named the Darling River after Governor Ralph Darling, but the Governor decided that the river should be named in honour of Logan instead.

Logan was the first European explorer to visit the upper reaches of the Brisbane River and other places in the vicinity including the areas now known as Esk and the mountain rainforests of Lamington National Park and Mount Barney National Park. He was the first European to explore the Bremer River, where he discovered deposits of limestone at a point later to become known as Ipswich.

Captain Logan unsuccessfully attempted to climb Mount Barney on 13 and 14 June 1827. On a return journey, Logan, Allan Cunningham, Charles Fraser and a small party attempted to ascend the peak, believing they were climbing Mount Warning, which was first identified by James Cook. A determined Logan carried on while the rest were too fearful of the hazardous and difficult climb. From atop the summit, which was at the time the highest point reached in Australia, Logan was able to see the true Mount Warning. Together with Cunningham they decided to call this range the McPherson Range. He named the peak he had just ascended, Mount Hooker, but because his map was lost, the mountain was later given another name, Mount Barney. He also originally named the current Mount Lindesay, Mount Hooker.

== Death ==
On 9 October 1830, Logan set out to explore and chart the headwaters of the Brisbane River with a small party of one private (his servant), and three convicts. The party was confronted several times by large armed groups of Aboriginals. The first meeting was when they were making a river crossing: a large group of men brandished weapons, rolled boulders down a hill at the group, and shouted 'Commidy Water' which was thought to mean that Logan should go back across the water. There were other confrontations and sightings. Logan had the habit of riding ahead of the group and during the return journey, on 17 October, they lost track of him, although they thought they could hear him shout 'Cooyee' and shouted back and fired guns. Searches eventually led to first his saddle, then his dead horse, hidden by boughs in a stream bed, then his body, buried in a shallow grave.

As the horse had evidently failed to leap over the creek resulting in its death, it has been conjectured that the injuries and death of Captain Logan may have been accidental. However, contemporary news reports are emphatic that he was murdered with native weapons, as proved by the settlement's surgeon, Mr Cowper, at an inquest.

In November 1830, Logan was buried in the Protestant burial ground in Surry Hills, Sydney.

== Legacy ==
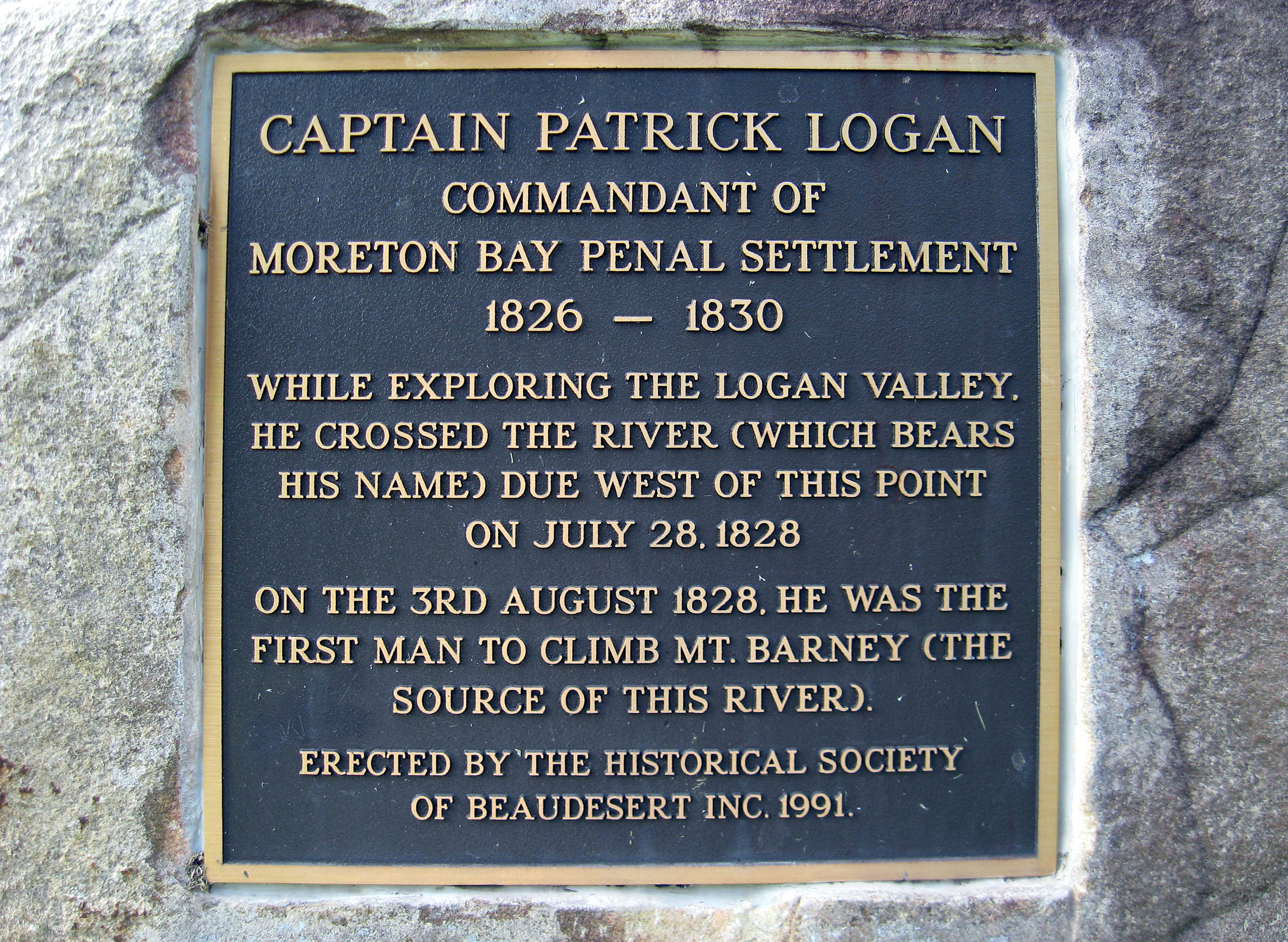
Monument to Patrick Logan at the Mount Lindesay Highway.

Logan had been hated by the convicts because of his strict discipline and program of punishments. Moreton Bay convicts "manifested insane joy at the news of his murder, and sang and hoorayed all night, in defiance of the warders." The ballad Moreton Bay represents Logan as a bloody tyrant. "Captain Logan, he had us mangled, on the triangles of Moreton Bay", attributes his death to "a native black", and concludes "my fellow prisoners, be exhilarated, that all such monsters such a death may find". In the long poem A Convict's Tour to Hell, written in 1839 by the convict Francis MacNamara, also thought to have composed the Moreton Bay lyrics, the convict sees Captain Logan suffering in hell.

Many geographic features in South East Queensland bear his name. These include Logan City, the Logan Motorway and Logan Road, Logan River, Logan Central, Logan Village, Logan Reserve, Loganholme, Loganlea and Logans Ridge. A commemorative plaque to one of Logan's expeditions can be found in Tully Memorial Park by the Logan River at North Maclean. The Queensland state electorate of Logan is also named for him.

The Commandant (1975) is a historical fiction novel by Jessica Anderson which describes the Moreton Bay penal settlement under Logan's command and the events surrounding his death from the viewpoint of his wife's sister Frances (a fictional character), who lives with the Logan family at the penal colony.

== See also ==
- Convicts in Australia
- List of explorers
