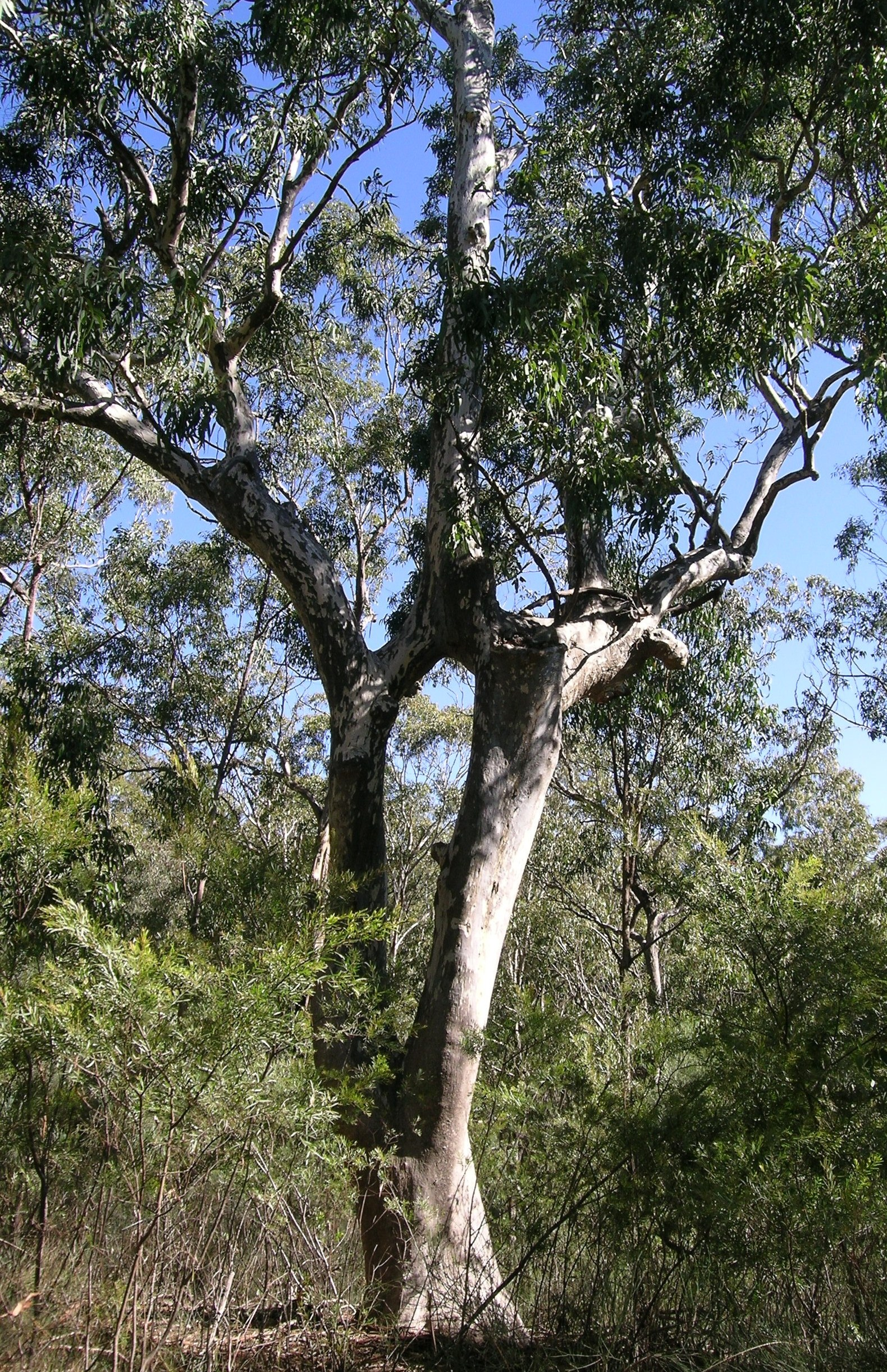
- Eucalyptus michaeliana in the Oxley Wild Rivers National Park

Conservation status
- Rare (NCA)

Scientific classification
- Kingdom: Plantae
- Clade: Embryophytes
- Clade: Tracheophytes
- Clade: Spermatophytes
- Clade: Angiosperms
- Clade: Eudicots
- Clade: Rosids
- Order: Myrtales
- Family: Myrtaceae
- Genus: Eucalyptus
- Species: E. michaeliana

Binomial name
- Eucalyptus michaeliana Blakely

= Eucalyptus michaeliana =

Hillgrove gum

Species of eucalyptus

Eucalyptus michaeliana, commonly known as Hillgrove gum or brittle gum, is a species of small to medium-sized tree endemic to eastern Australia. It has smooth mottled greyish bark, lance-shaped to curved adult leaves, flower buds in compound umbels, white flowers and cup-shaped or barrel-shaped fruit.

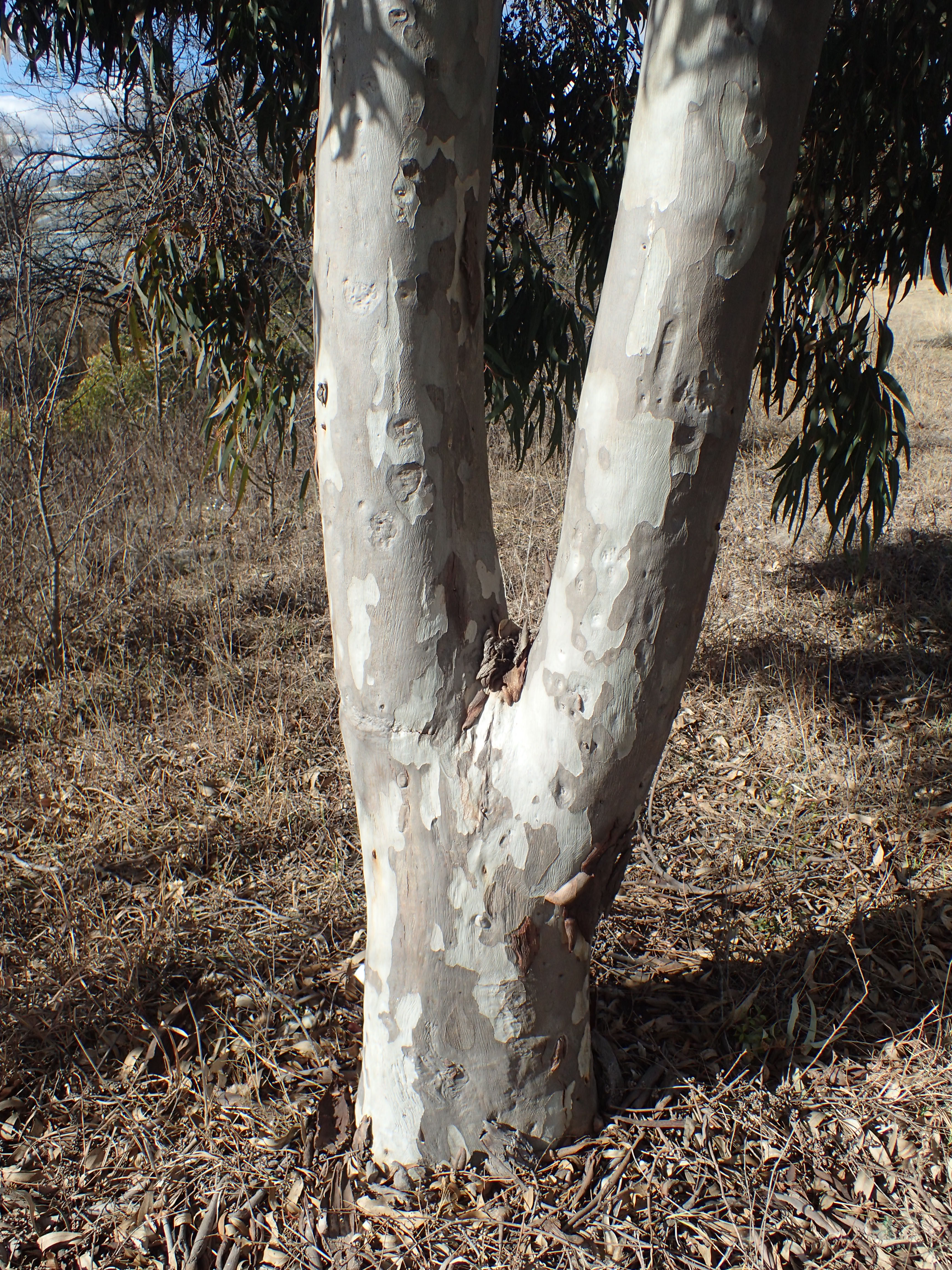
Bark

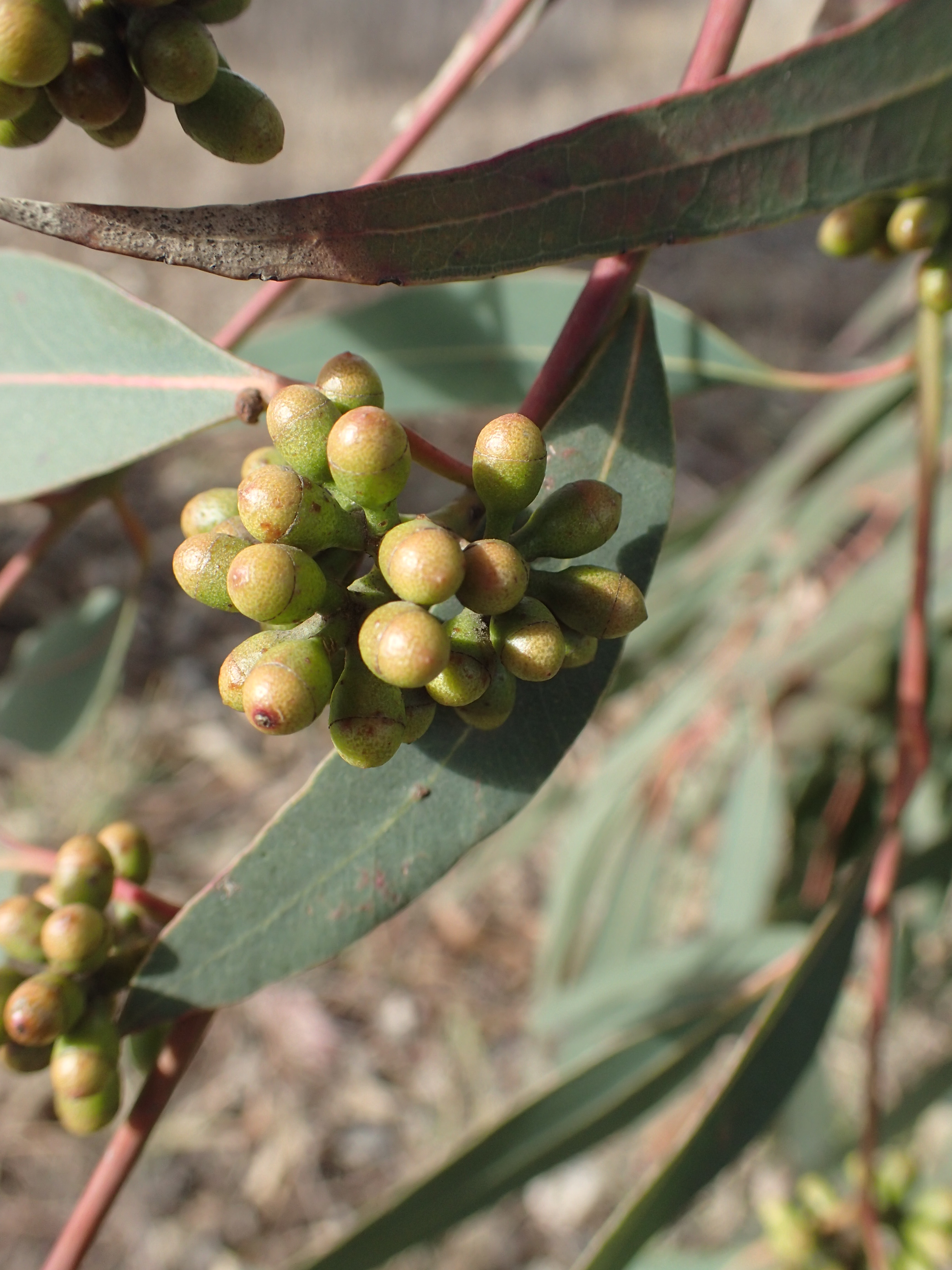
Buds

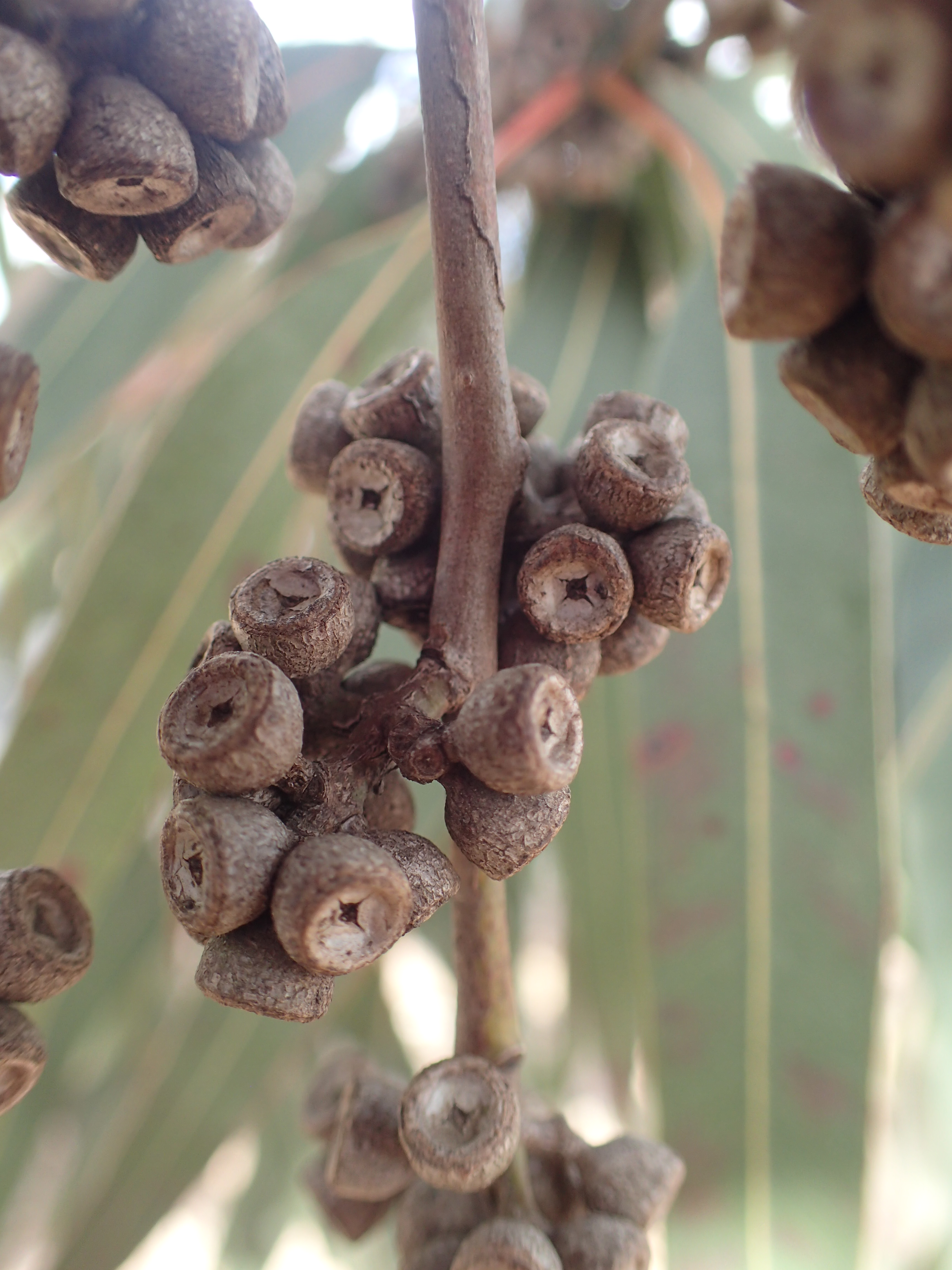
Fruit

== Description ==
Eucalyptus michaeliana is a tree that typically grows to a height of 30 m (98 ft) and forms a lignotuber. It has smooth, mottled, grey and white or cream-coloured bark shed in plates or flakes. Young plants and coppice regrowth have lance-shaped to broadly lance-shaped leaves with the same dull green colour on both sides, 50–150 mm (2.0–5.9 in) long and 12–55 mm (0.47–2.17 in) wide. Adult leaves are lance-shaped to curved, 90–180 mm (3.5–7.1 in) long and 10–23 mm (0.39–0.91 in) wide on a petiole 15–30 mm (0.59–1.18 in) long. The flower buds are arranged in leaf axils on a peduncle with three to five groups of buds, each with three or seven buds. The peduncle is 3–5 mm (0.12–0.20 in) long, each bud on a pedicel 2–5 mm (0.079–0.197 in) long. Mature buds are oblong, 5–6 mm (0.20–0.24 in) long and 3–4 mm (0.12–0.16 in) wide with a conical to rounded operculum. Flowering occurs in March and the flowers are white. The fruit is a woody, cup-shaped or barrel-shaped capsule 3–5 mm (0.12–0.20 in) long and 4–6 mm (0.16–0.24 in) wide with the valves near rim level or below it.

== Taxonomy and naming ==
Eucalyptus michaeliana was first formally described in 1938 by William Blakely from specimens collected by John Fauna Campbell near Hillgrove in 1907. The description was published in Proceedings of the Linnean Society of New South Wales. The specific epithet honours Norman Michael (1884–1951), a clergyman who collected plant specimens in Queensland, including this species that he collected in 1937 whilst he was a minister at Boonah.

== Distribution and habitat ==
Hillgrove gum grows in woodland on sandy soils and has a disjunct distribution between St Albans and Wollomombi in New South Wales and in south-east Queensland.
