= Mount Barney National Park =

National park in Queensland, Australia

- IUCN category II (national park)
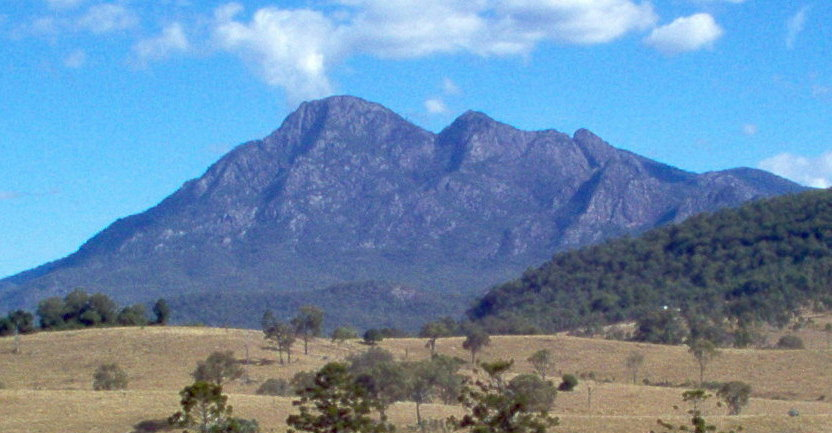
- Mount Barney

- Location within Queensland
- Location: Queensland
- Nearest city: Rathdowney
- Coordinates: 28°16′25″S 152°39′43″E
- Area: 130 km^{2} (50 sq mi)
- Established: 6 September 1947
- Governing body: Queensland Parks and Wildlife Service
- Website: Official website

Mount Barney National Park is a national park in Queensland (Australia), 90 km southwest of Brisbane. It amalgamated the adjacent Mount Lindesay National Park in 1980. It is part of the Scenic Rim Important Bird Area, identified as such by BirdLife International because of its importance in the conservation of several species of threatened birds.

== Geography ==
Mount Barney, Mount Maroon, Mount May and Mount Lindesay rise majestically above the surrounding farmlands in Mount Barney National Park on the Queensland/New South Wales border. These rugged peaks are the remains of the ancient Focal Peak Shield Volcano which erupted 24 million years ago. Mount Barney (1359m) is the second-highest peak in south-east Queensland and has some very rare and unique plants. The town of Rathdowney is closest, 15 km to the northeast.

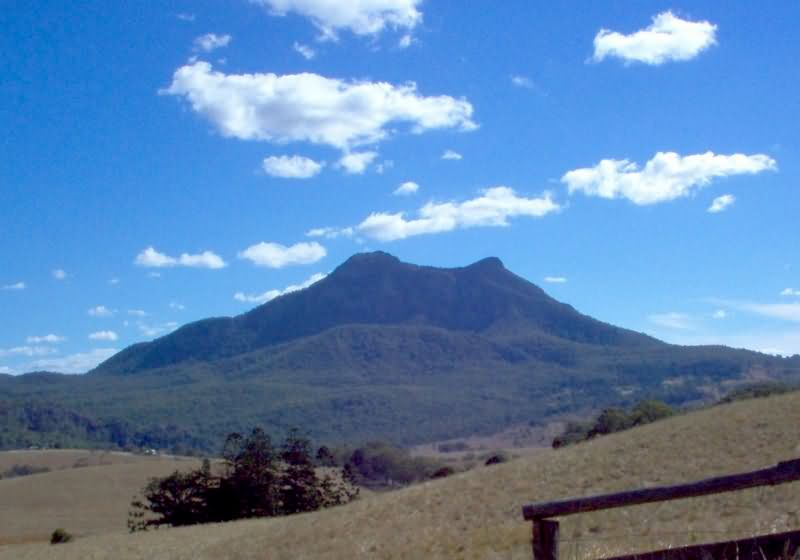
Mount Maroon is one of five peaks in the park, 1994

The park is dominated by the grand twin peaks of Mount Barney. Surrounding these peaks are numerous mountains, steep valleys, caves, deep rock pools and much woodland forest. The park also contains the peaks of Mount Ballow, Mount Ernest, Mount Maroon and Mount May.

== History ==
Mount Barney National Park and Mount Lindesay National Park were gazetted in 1947. In 1950, Mount Barney National Park was extended to include Mount May and Mount Maroon. In 1980, it was enlarged again incorporating Mount Lindesday National Park.

In 1994, Mount Barney National Park became part of the Gondwana Rainforests of Australia (formerly known as the Central Eastern Rainforest Reserves) as a UNESCO World Heritage Site.

== Accommodation ==
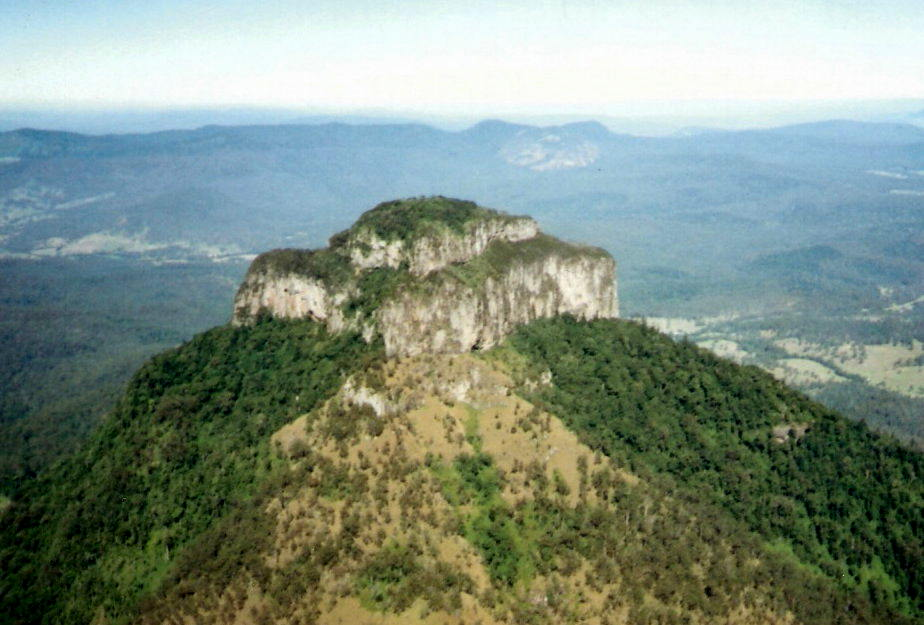
Mount Lindesay

Bush camping is allowed at Mount May and Mount Barney. Restrictions apply during peak holiday times.

== Flora and fauna ==
The park has extremely varied vegetation with open forests around the foothills of the peaks, subtropical rainforest above 600m, montane heath shrublands towards the summit of the peaks, cool temperate rainforest on the summit of Mount Ballow, and mallee eucalypt shrublands on Mount Maroon. Many rare and unusual plant species grow in the park including the endangered Maroon wattle, and the rare mallee eucalypt Eucalyptus codonocarpa, Mount Barney bush pea and Hillgrove spotted gum.

Visitors to the park may notice the abundant birdlife due to their bird songs. A few playful platypus live in the park. The rainforest on Mount Barney provides critical habitat for the plumiferus subspecies of the marbled frogmouth. This bird is listed as vulnerable.

== Recreation ==
There are expansive views over the Border Ranges and Scenic Rim forests from the summit of Mount Barney. The mountain is an old bushwalking destination by Australian standards and more than 30 routes lead to the summits of its East and West peaks. The majority of routes are not maintained by the Queensland State government and therefore navigational skills are mandatory, especially for first time visitors. The most challenging routes up Mount Barney include Logan's Ridge and Short Leaning Ridge. Peasants or South Ridge is a better choice for less experienced climbers. Allow plenty of time for the ascent and descent, which require between eight and ten hours, depending on the route and level of fitness. Walkers need navigational and bushwalking skills and sound physical fitness. It is not unusual to meet climbers at all hours of the day and night, however prior knowledge of the area is required.

A popular alternative to going up and down South Ridge is to ascend via South East Ridge and descend via South Ridge. Navigational equipment or local knowledge are required for this route. The benefit of ascending via South East Ridge is that the track incorporates the East Peak. From the East Peak the track drops down into the saddle area at the base of the West Peak. The West Peak can be incorporated into this walk at an additional 2 km (allow two hours).

There are a few Class 4 walks around the base of the mountain that don't involve as much navigation over terrain.

Nearby Mount Maroon is popular for rockclimbing. The first known climb to the summit of Mt Barney by a European was completed in 1828 by Captain Patrick Logan, by one of the hardest and most spectacular ridges on the mountain, named in his honour. Allan Cunningham and Charles Fraser were also in his company, however they did not reach the summit.

== See also ==
- Protected areas of Queensland
