= Acacia neobrachycarpa =

Scientific classification
- Kingdom: Plantae
- Clade: Tracheophytes
- Clade: Angiosperms
- Clade: Eudicots
- Clade: Rosids
- Order: Fabales
- Family: Fabaceae
- Subfamily: Caesalpinioideae
- Clade: Mimosoid clade
- Genus: Acacia
- Species: A. neobrachycarpa

Binomial name
- Acacia neobrachycarpa I.M.Turner
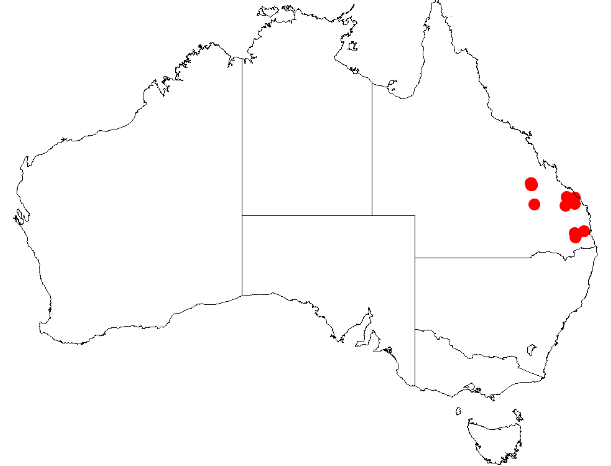

Synonyms
- Acacia brachycarpa Pedley nom. illeg.; Racosperma brachycarpum Pedley

Species of legume

Acacia neobrachycarpa is a species of flowering plant in the family Fabaceae, and is endemic to south-east Queensland, Australia. It is a compact, much-branched shrub with scattered, linear to triangular phyllodes, spherical heads of bright lemon yellow flowers and firmly papery pods.

== Description ==
Acacia neobrachycarpa is a compact, much-branched shrub that typically grows to a height of up to 2 m (6 ft 7 in), but is usually much smaller. Its branchlets are sparsely to moderately covered with soft hairs. Its phyllodes are scattered, linear, triangular to four-sided in cross section, 9–15 mm (0.35–0.59 in) long, 1 mm (0.039 in) wide, sharply pointed, rigid and glabrous. There is an obscure gland 1.5–2.5 mm (0.059–0.098 in) above the base and stipules about 1 mm (0.039 in) long at the base. The flowers are borne in spherical heads in axils on a peduncle 1.5–4 mm (0.059–0.157 in) long, each head with 8 to 18 bright lemon yellow flowers. The pods are firmly papery, 8–20 mm (0.31–0.79 in) long, 3–4 mm (0.12–0.16 in) wide, blackish and glabrous. The immature seeds are oblong, 3.5 mm (0.14 in) long and lack an aril.

== Taxonomy ==
This species was first formally described in 1969 by Leslie Pedley who gave it the name Acacia brachycarpa in Contributions from the Queensland Herbarium from specimens collected by Nathaniel Henry Speck, from specimens collected 21 mi (34 km) south-east of Bedourie in 1963, but that name was illegitimate because it had already been given to a fossil species. The specific epithet (brachycarpa) means 'short-fruited'. In 2014, Ian Mark Turner changed the name to Acacia neobrachycarpa in the journal Annales Botanici Fennici.

== Distribution and habitat ==
This species of wattle occurs sporadically in south-eastern Queensland from the Blackdown Tableland to Stanthorpe, usually on sandstone in open Eucalyptus forest.

== Conservation status ==
Acacia neobrachycarpa is listed as 'least concern' under the Queensland Government Nature Conservation Act 1992.

== See also ==
- List of Acacia species
