= Mount Maroon =

Mountain in Australia

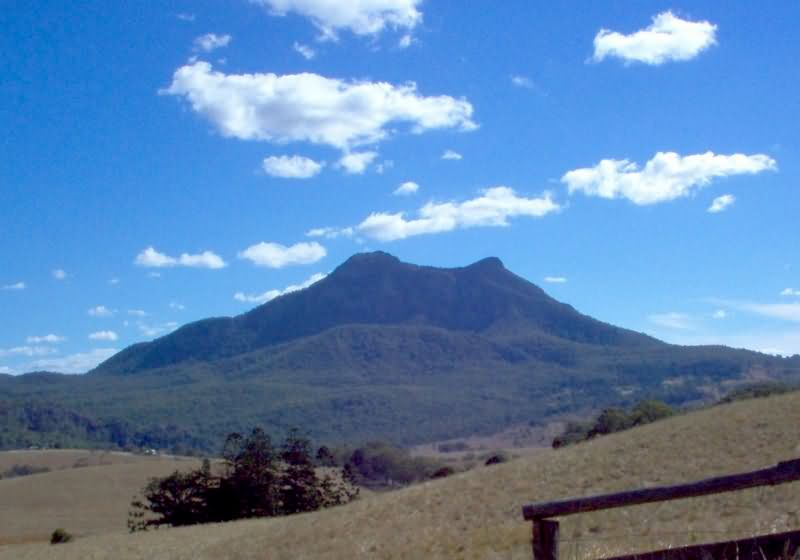
- Mount Maroon

Highest point
- Elevation: 966 m (3,169 ft)
- Coordinates: 28°12′59″S 152°43′59″E

Geography
- Location within Queensland
- Location: Queensland, Australia
- Parent range: McPherson Range

Mount Maroon is a mountain in South East Queensland that is part of the McPherson Range. The mountain rises to 966 m (3,169 ft) above sea level about 12 km west of Rathdowney.

The original indigenous name for the mountain is Wahlmoorum which means sand goanna in the Yuggera language. Another aboriginal name documented for the mountain is Dahl-moor-uhn, which means "big fellow waterhole bunyip" attributed to two small yet deep lagoons, on the summit of the mountain. The earliest photograph of the lagoons are from 1910. The current name for the mountain comes from the first grazing property in the area called Maroon.

Mount Maroon consists mainly of rhyolite and has its geological origins in cooling molten rock beneath the surface.

The mountain was first gazetted in 1938 as Mount Maroon National Park. In 1950, Mount Barney National Park was extended to include Mount Maroon and nearby Mount May. The mountain contains areas of montane heath vegetation, rocky pavement and mallee ash shrublands.

Three rock climbers had to be rescued from the mountain in 2002. In early 2008 a bull mastiff named Diff made headlines when it slipped over a ledge and had to be rescued via helicopter. The dog, which was not permitted to be in the national park, led rescuers (by its barking) to two men who were stranded on a steep cliff ledge while trying to rescue the dog.

== See also ==
- List of mountains in Australia
