= Electoral results for the district of Albert =

Election results for Albert, Queensland, Australia

This is a list of electoral results for the electoral district of Albert in Queensland state elections.

== Members for Albert ==
First incarnation (1888–1950)
Member	Party	Term
Thomas Plunkett Sr.	Conservative	1888–1890
Thomas Plunkett Sr.	Ministerialist	1890–1896
Robert Collins	Independent	1896–1899
Thomas Plunkett Sr.	Opposition	1899–1903
Thomas Plunkett Sr.	Liberal	1903–1907
Thomas Plunkett Sr.	Kidstonites	1907–1908
John Appel	Conservative	1908–1909
John Appel	Liberal	1909–1915
John Appel	Farmers' Union	1915–1917
John Appel	National	1917–1919
John Appel	Country	1919–1922
John Appel	United	1922–1925
John Appel	CPNP	1925–1929
Thomas Plunkett Jr.	CPNP	1929–1936
Thomas Plunkett Jr.	Country	1936–1950
Second incarnation (1960–2017)
Member	Party	Term
Cec Carey	Country	1960–1969
Bill Heatley	Liberal	1970–1971
Bill D'Arcy	Labor	1972–1974
Ivan Gibbs	National	1974–1989
John Szczerbanik	Labor	1989–1995
Bill Baumann	National	1995–2001
Margaret Keech	Labor	2001–2012
Mark Boothman	Liberal National	2012–2017

== Election results ==
=== Elections in the 2010s ===
2015 Queensland state election: Albert
Party	Candidate	Votes	%	±%
Liberal National	Mark Boothman	13,597	43.13	−6.46
Labor	Melissa McMahon	11,145	35.35	+6.99
Palmer United	Blair Brewster	3,428	10.87	+10.87
Greens	Jane Cajdler	1,923	6.10	+0.70
Family First	Amanda Best	1,434	4.55	−1.24
Total formal votes		31,527	97.21	+0.04
Informal votes		906	2.79	−0.04
Turnout		32,433	88.33	−3.09
Two-party-preferred result
Liberal National	Mark Boothman	14,872	51.67	−10.22
Labor	Melissa McMahon	13,911	48.33	+10.22
Liberal National hold		Swing	−10.22	

2012 Queensland state election: Albert
Party	Candidate	Votes	%	±%
Liberal National	Mark Boothman	13,888	49.59	+10.43
Labor	Margaret Keech	7,943	28.36	−21.69
Katter's Australian	Adam Hollis	3,045	10.87	+10.87
Family First	Amanda Best	1,620	5.78	+5.78
Greens	Petrina Maizey	1,511	5.40	−1.68
Total formal votes		28,007	97.17	−0.33
Informal votes		817	2.83	+0.33
Turnout		28,824	91.43	+1.13
Two-party-preferred result
Liberal National	Mark Boothman	15,198	61.89	+18.36
Labor	Margaret Keech	9,358	38.11	−18.36
Liberal National gain from Labor		Swing	+18.36	

=== Elections in the 2000s ===
2009 Queensland state election: Albert
Party	Candidate	Votes	%	±%
Labor	Margaret Keech	12,649	49.98	−7.2
Liberal National	Andrea Johanson	9,841	38.89	+7.4
Greens	Marlee Bruinsma	1,792	7.08	−0.2
Independent	Geoff Flannery	1,024	4.05	+4.0
Total formal votes		25,306	97.50	+0.4
Informal votes		648	2.50	–0.4
Turnout		25,954	90.30	
Two-party-preferred result
Labor	Margaret Keech	13,409	56.47	−7.3
Liberal National	Andrea Johanson	10,335	43.53	+7.3
Labor hold		Swing	−7.3	

2006 Queensland state election: Albert
Party	Candidate	Votes	%	±%
Labor	Margaret Keech	17,429	60.0	+0.0
Liberal	Karen Woodrow	8,161	28.1	+0.5
Greens	Marella Pettinato	1,799	6.2	+0.9
Family First	Jonathon Eaton	1,682	5.8	+5.8
Total formal votes		29,071	97.4	−0.0
Informal votes		789	2.6	+0.0
Turnout		29,860	89.6	−1.1
Two-party-preferred result
Labor	Margaret Keech	18,312	67.0	−0.3
Liberal	Karen Woodrow	9,017	33.0	+0.3
Labor hold		Swing	−0.3	

2004 Queensland state election: Albert
Party	Candidate	Votes	%	±%
Labor	Margaret Keech	15,438	60.0	+9.4
Liberal	Corey Kolar	7,101	27.6	+14.0
One Nation	Chris Coyle	1,826	7.1	−16.7
Greens	Bill Livermore	1,364	5.3	+5.3
Total formal votes		25,729	97.4	−0.1
Informal votes		673	2.6	+0.1
Turnout		26,402	90.7	−1.5
Two-party-preferred result
Labor	Margaret Keech	16,173	67.3	+4.7
Liberal	Corey Kolar	7,869	32.7	+32.7
Labor hold		Swing	+4.7	

2001 Queensland state election: Albert
Party	Candidate	Votes	%	±%
Labor	Margaret Keech	11,551	50.6	+13.4
One Nation	Rod Evans	5,438	23.8	−5.1
Liberal	Andrea Johanson	3,092	13.6	+10.2
National	Tony McMullan	2,725	11.9	−13.5
Total formal votes		22,806	97.5	
Informal votes		578	2.5	
Turnout		23,384	92.2	
Two-candidate-preferred result
Labor	Margaret Keech	13,207	62.6	+12.9
One Nation	Rod Evans	7,875	37.4	+37.4
Labor gain from National		Swing	+12.9	

=== Elections in the 1990s ===
1998 Queensland state election: Albert
Party	Candidate	Votes	%	±%
National	Bill Baumann	9,920	33.8	−14.2
Labor	Peter Shooter	9,772	33.3	−6.3
One Nation	Rod Evans	7,909	26.9	+26.9
Greens	Sally Spain	1,472	5.0	−1.2
Reform	Lyn Green	305	1.0	+1.0
Total formal votes		29,378	98.3	+0.2
Informal votes		519	1.7	−0.2
Turnout		29,897	91.7	
Two-party-preferred result
National	Bill Baumann	14,500	54.8	+0.9
Labor	Peter Shooter	11,943	45.2	−0.9
National hold		Swing	+0.9	

1995 Queensland state election: Albert
Party	Candidate	Votes	%	±%
National	Bill Baumann	11,505	47.9	+19.4
Labor	John Szczerbanik	9,499	39.6	−8.7
Greens	Bill Heck	1,491	6.2	+6.2
Democrats	Sharon Lucht	998	4.2	+4.2
Independent	John O'Connor	515	2.1	+2.1
Total formal votes		24,008	98.1	+0.6
Informal votes		468	1.9	−0.6
Turnout		24,476	90.5	
Two-party-preferred result
National	Bill Baumann	12,392	53.9	+5.5
Labor	John Szczerbanik	10,602	46.1	−5.5
National gain from Labor		Swing	+5.5	

1992 Queensland state election: Albert
Party	Candidate	Votes	%	±%
Labor	John Szczerbanik	9,388	48.3	+3.4
National	Paul Flann	5,541	28.5	−0.2
Liberal	David Logan	4,512	23.2	−1.3
Total formal votes		19,441	97.5	
Informal votes		497	2.5	
Turnout		19,938	90.9	
Two-party-preferred result
Labor	John Szczerbanik	9,753	51.6	−8.8
National	Paul Flann	9,132	48.4	+8.8
Labor hold		Swing	−8.8	

=== Elections in the 1980s ===
1989 Queensland state election: Albert
Party	Candidate	Votes	%	±%
Labor	John Szczerbanik	10,511	42.5	+10.5
National	Ivan Gibbs	7,106	28.8	−20.3
Liberal	Kay Elson	6,690	27.1	+8.2
Advance Australia	John Ivory	404	1.6	+1.6
Total formal votes		24,711	97.1	−0.9
Informal votes		730	2.9	+0.9
Turnout		25,441	91.0	+0.6
Two-party-preferred result
Labor	John Szczerbanik	14,749	59.7	+22.8
National	Ivan Gibbs	9,962	40.3	−22.8
Labor gain from National		Swing	+22.8	

1986 Queensland state election: Albert
Party	Candidate	Votes	%	±%
National	Ivan Gibbs	8,351	49.1	−7.4
Labor	Tom Harrison	5,446	32.0	−11.5
Liberal	Vince Camilleri	3,222	18.9	+18.9
Total formal votes		17,019	98.0	
Informal votes		345	2.0	
Turnout		17,364	90.4	
Two-party-preferred result
National	Ivan Gibbs	10,744	63.1	+4.3
Labor	Tom Harrison	6,275	36.9	−4.3
National hold		Swing	+4.3	

1983 Queensland state election: Albert
Party	Candidate	Votes	%	±%
National	Ivan Gibbs	14,595	56.5	+11.7
Labor	Walter Ehrich	11,239	43.5	+9.8
Total formal votes		25,834	97.6	−0.5
Informal votes		639	2.4	+0.5
Turnout		26,473	89.1	+3.2
National hold		Swing	−4.4	

1980 Queensland state election: Albert
Party	Candidate	Votes	%	±%
National	Ivan Gibbs	8,730	44.8	−8.5
Labor	Harry Zaphir	6,565	33.7	−9.6
Liberal	John Juett	3,342	17.1	+17.1
Democrats	Peter Woolley	501	2.6	+2.6
Independent	Reginald Campbell	351	1.8	+1.8
Total formal votes		19,489	98.1	+0.2
Informal votes		383	1.9	−0.2
Turnout		19,872	85.9	−3.5
Two-party-preferred result
National	Ivan Gibbs	11,877	60.9	+5.9
Labor	Harry Zaphir	7,612	39.1	−5.9
National hold		Swing	+5.9	

=== Elections in the 1970s ===
1977 Queensland state election: Albert
Party	Candidate	Votes	%	±%
National	Ivan Gibbs	8,010	53.3	+16.6
Labor	Denis O'Connell	4,582	30.5	−6.0
Labor	Cecil Clark	1,922	12.8	+12.8
Independent	Alex McMillan	295	2.0	+2.0
Independent	Ace Drabsch	229	1.5	+1.5
Total formal votes		15,038	97.9	
Informal votes		320	2.1	
Turnout		15,358	89.5	
Two-party-preferred result
National	Ivan Gibbs	8,271	55.0	−6.2
Labor	Denis O'Connell	6,766	45.0	+6.2
National hold		Swing	−6.2	

1974 Queensland state election: Albert
Party	Candidate	Votes	%	±%
National	Ivan Gibbs	6,622	36.6	+7.8
Labor	Bill D'Arcy	6,599	36.5	−14.0
Liberal	K. Brough	4,543	25.1	+8.9
Independent	J.W. Black	174	1.0	−0.1
Democratic Labor	H.W. Trigger	130	0.7	−2.0
Total formal votes		18,068	97.2	−0.5
Informal votes		526	2.8	+0.5
Turnout		18,594	87.1	−2.6
Two-party-preferred result
National	Ivan Gibbs	10,867	60.1	+14.2
Labor	Bill D'Arcy	7,201	39.9	−14.2
National gain from Labor		Swing	+14.2	

1972 Queensland state election: Albert
Party	Candidate	Votes	%	±%
Labor	Bill D'Arcy	6,781	50.5	+30.9
Country	Ivan Gibbs	3,876	28.8	−21.8
Liberal	R.E. Allen	2,183	16.2	+3.3
Democratic Labor	T.L. McKenzie	357	2.7	+0.1
Independent	J.W. Black	141	1.1	+1.1
Independent	W.L. Wollstein	101	0.8	+0.8
Total formal votes		13,439	97.7	
Informal votes		319	2.3	
Turnout		13,758	89.7	
Two-party-preferred result
Labor	Bill D'Arcy	7,268	54.1	+23.3
Country	Ivan Gibbs	6,171	45.9	−23.3
Labor gain from Country		Swing	+23.3	

Albert state by-election, 1970
Party	Candidate	Votes	%	±%
Labor	Bill D'Arcy	6,143	43.0	+23.4
Liberal	Bill Heatley	3,899	27.3	+14.4
Country	D.F.C. Beck	3,820	26.7	−23.8
Independent	E.A. Nunn	416	2.9	+2.9
Total formal votes		14,278	99.0	+1.4
Informal votes		148	1.0	−1.4
Turnout		14,426	88.7	−0.6
Two-party-preferred result
Liberal	Bill Heatley	7,206	50.5	+50.5
Labor	Bill D'Arcy	7,072	49.5	+24.7
Liberal gain from Country		Swing	+50.5	

=== Elections in the 1960s ===
1969 Queensland state election: Albert
Party	Candidate	Votes	%	±%
Country	Cec Carey	7,081	50.6	+8.9
Labor	William Woollstein	2,750	19.6	−1.4
Independent	Ernest Harley	1,970	14.1	+14.1
Liberal	Paul Scanlan	1,804	12.9	−20.4
Democratic Labor	Brian Balaam	361	2.6	−1.4
Independent	William Steer	35	0.3	+0.3
Total formal votes		14,001	97.6	−1.5
Informal votes		351	2.4	+1.5
Turnout		14,352	89.3	−2.8
Two-party-preferred result
Country	Cec Carey	10,530	75.2	+1.6
Labor	William Wollstein	3,471	24.8	−1.6
Country hold		Swing	+1.6	

1966 Queensland state election: Albert
Party	Candidate	Votes	%	±%
Country	Cec Carey	4,624	41.7	−2.7
Liberal	Ernest Harley	3,686	33.3	+33.3
Labor	H.I. Evans	2,324	21.0	−0.5
Democratic Labor	P.V. Hallinan	449	4.0	+4.0
Total formal votes		11,083	99.1	−0.2
Informal votes		105	0.9	+0.2
Turnout		11,188	92.1	−1.0
Two-candidate-preferred result
Country	Cec Carey	5,566	50.2	−5.7
Liberal	Ernest Harley	5,517	49.8	+49.8
Country hold		Swing	−5.7	

1963 Queensland state election: Albert
Party	Candidate	Votes	%	±%
Country	Cec Carey	4,191	44.4	+4.8
Independent	Ernest Harley	3,225	34.1	−2.3
Labor	Eugene Ulrick	2,026	21.5	−0.9
Total formal votes		9,442	99.3	+0.3
Informal votes		68	0.7	−0.3
Turnout		9,510	93.1	+0.2
Two-candidate-preferred result
Country	Cec Carey	5,281	55.9	
Independent	Ernest Harley	4,161	44.1	
Country hold		Swing	N/A	

1960 Queensland state election: Albert
Party	Candidate	Votes	%	±%
Country	Cec Carey	3,277	39.6	
Independent	Ernest Harley	3,017	36.4	
Labor	Cecil Jesson	1,853	22.4	
Independent Country	G.D. Plunkett	132	1.6	
Total formal votes		8,279	98.9	
Informal votes		88	1.1	
Turnout		8,367	92.9	
Country win		(new seat)		

=== Elections in the 1940s ===
1947 Queensland state election: Albert
Party	Candidate	Votes	%	±%
Country	Thomas Plunkett	8,090	68.6	+17.8
Labor	J. Cosser	3,037	31.4	−0.5
Total formal votes		11,799	98.7	−0.4
Informal votes		159	1.3	+0.4
Turnout		11,958	89.8	+6.0
Country hold		Swing	+9.1	

1944 Queensland state election: Albert
Party	Candidate	Votes	%	±%
Country	Thomas Plunkett	4,842	50.8	−11.6
Labor	John Rosser	3,037	31.9	−5.7
Independent Country	Edward Coghlan	1,654	17.3	+17.3
Total formal votes		9,533	99.1	+0.8
Informal votes		84	0.9	−0.8
Turnout		9,617	83.8	−3.5
Country hold		Swing	−2.9	

1941 Queensland state election: Albert
Party	Candidate	Votes	%	±%
Country	Thomas Plunkett	5,617	62.4	+21.9
Labor	John Bray	3,386	37.6	+9.0
Total formal votes		9,003	98.3	−0.7
Informal votes		156	1.7	+0.7
Turnout		9,159	87.3	−5.1
Country hold		Swing	+7.5	

=== Elections in the 1930s ===
1938 Queensland state election: Albert
Party	Candidate	Votes	%	±%
Country	Thomas Plunkett	3,713	40.5	−13.0
Labor	John Bray	2,622	28.6	+28.6
Protestant Labour	R.C. Elliott	1,542	16.8	+16.8
Social Credit	George Gray	1,289	14.1	−32.4
Total formal votes		9,166	99.0	+1.9
Informal votes		95	1.0	−1.9
Turnout		9,261	92.4	+1.0
Two-party-preferred result
Country	Thomas Plunkett	4,195	54.9	+1.5
Labor	John Bray	3,446	45.1	+45.1
Country hold		Swing	+1.5	

1935 Queensland state election: Albert
Party	Candidate	Votes	%	±%
CPNP	Thomas Plunkett	4,452	53.5	−9.8
Social Credit	George Gray	3,875	46.5	+46.5
Total formal votes		8,327	97.1	−2.5
Informal votes		245	2.9	+2.5
Turnout		8,572	91.4	−2.8
CPNP hold		Swing	−9.8	

1932 Queensland state election: Albert
Party	Candidate	Votes	%	±%
CPNP	Thomas Plunkett	4,920	63.3	−9.7
Labor	H.J. Wilson	2,847	36.7	+9.7
Total formal votes		7,767	99.6	+0.9
Informal votes		33	0.4	−0.9
Turnout		7,800	94.2	+4.5
CPNP hold		Swing	−9.7	

=== Elections in the 1920s ===
1929 Queensland state election: Albert
Party	Candidate	Votes	%	±%
CPNP	Thomas Plunkett	5,446	73.0	+4.2
Labor	Edward Moran	2,011	27.0	−4.2
Total formal votes		7,458	98.7	+0.1
Informal votes		99	1.3	−0.1
Turnout		7,557	89.7	+0.7
CPNP hold		Swing	+4.2	

1926 Queensland state election: Albert
Party	Candidate	Votes	%	±%
CPNP	John Appel	4,736	68.8	−31.2
Labor	W.H. Lake	2,071	30.1	+30.1
Independent	E.T. Wilkins	81	1.2	+1.2
Total formal votes		6,888	98.6	
Informal votes		95	1.4	
Turnout		6,983	89.0	
CPNP hold		Swing	−30.6	

1923 Queensland state election: Albert
Party	Candidate	Votes	%	±%
United	John Appel	unopposed		
Member changed to United from Country		Swing	N/A	

1920 Queensland state election: Albert
Party	Candidate	Votes	%	±%
Country	John Appel	3,688	69.5	+69.5
Labor	Richard Holden	1,621	30.5	−7.4
Total formal votes		5,309	99.5	+0.4
Informal votes		26	0.5	−0.4
Turnout		5,335	80.4	
Country gain from National		Swing	+69.5	

=== Elections in the 1910s ===
1918 Queensland state election: Albert
Party	Candidate	Votes	%	±%
National	John Appel	2,999	62.1	+62.1
Labor	William Lawson	1,832	37.9	+37.9
Total formal votes		4,831	99.1	
Informal votes		43	0.9	
Turnout		4,874	80.4	
National gain from Farmers' Union		Swing	+62.1	

1915 Queensland state election: Albert
Party	Candidate	Votes	%	±%
Farmers' Union	John Appel	unopposed		
Farmers' Union gain from Liberal		Swing	N/A	

1912 Queensland state election: Albert
Party	Candidate	Votes	%	±%
Liberal	John Appel	unopposed		
Liberal hold		Swing		
