= Electoral results for the district of Woodridge =

This is a list of electoral results for the electoral district of Woodridge in Queensland state elections.

== Members for Woodridge ==
Member	Party	Term
Bill D'Arcy	Labor	1977–2000
Mike Kaiser	Labor	2000–2001
Mike Kaiser	Independent	2001
Desley Scott	Labor	2001–2015
Cameron Dick	Labor	2015–present

== Election results ==
=== Elections in the 2020s ===
2024 Queensland state election: Woodridge
Party	Candidate	Votes	%	±%
Labor	Cameron Dick	16,093	53.6	−13.4
Liberal National	Paul Darwen	6,315	21.0	+6.0
Greens	Muhammed Ansary	3,940	13.1	+5.8
One Nation	Zoran Kazovic	2,233	7.5	−3.2
Family First	Karilyn Larsen	1,434	4.8	+4.8
Total formal votes		30,015	93.4	
Informal votes		2,137	6.6	
Turnout		32,152		
Two-party-preferred result
Labor	Cameron Dick	20,510	68.3	−7.9
Liberal National	Paul Darwen	9,505	31.7	+7.9
Labor hold		Swing	-7.9	

2020 Queensland state election: Woodridge
Party	Candidate	Votes	%	±%
Labor	Cameron Dick	18,935	66.97	+1.91
Liberal National	Russell Bauer	4,249	15.03	−0.01
One Nation	Lann Valentine	3,006	10.63	+10.63
Greens	Valerie Bennett	2,084	7.37	−0.19
Total formal votes		28,274	94.54	+2.40
Informal votes		1,634	5.46	−2.40
Turnout		29,908	81.30	−0.70
Two-party-preferred result
Labor	Cameron Dick	21,558	76.25	−0.12
Liberal National	Russell Bauer	6,716	23.75	+0.12
Labor hold		Swing	−0.12	

=== Elections in the 2010s ===
2017 Queensland state election: Woodridge
Party	Candidate	Votes	%	±%
Labor	Cameron Dick	17,837	65.1	+1.6
Liberal National	Michael Rooms	4,122	15.0	−5.0
Independent	Trevor Palmer	3,385	12.3	+3.6
Greens	Jacob Rice	2,072	7.6	+0.7
Total formal votes		27,416	92.1	−4.5
Informal votes		2,340	7.9	+4.5
Turnout		29,756	82.0	−2.1
Two-party-preferred result
Labor	Cameron Dick	20,937	76.4	+0.6
Liberal National	Michael Rooms	6,479	23.6	−0.6
Labor hold		Swing	+0.6	

2015 Queensland state election: Woodridge
Party	Candidate	Votes	%	±%
Labor	Cameron Dick	16,375	62.72	+15.97
Liberal National	Steve Viliamu	5,140	19.69	−16.23
Greens	Scott Thomson	1,922	7.36	−1.21
Independent	Trevor Palmer	1,718	6.58	+6.58
Independent	Dave Beard	954	3.65	+3.65
Total formal votes		26,109	96.49	+0.59
Informal votes		951	3.51	−0.59
Turnout		27,060	86.54	−1.50
Two-party-preferred result
Labor	Cameron Dick	18,437	75.95	+20.15
Liberal National	Steve Viliamu	5,839	24.05	−20.15
Labor hold		Swing	+20.15	

2012 Queensland state election: Woodridge
Party	Candidate	Votes	%	±%
Labor	Desley Scott	11,730	46.75	−22.09
Liberal National	Simon Dorries	9,012	35.92	+14.35
Family First	Justin Geange	2,199	8.76	+8.76
Greens	John Reddington	2,150	8.57	−1.01
Total formal votes		25,091	95.89	−1.15
Informal votes		1,075	4.11	+1.15
Turnout		26,166	88.04	−0.04
Two-party-preferred result
Labor	Desley Scott	12,787	55.80	−19.57
Liberal National	Simon Dorries	10,130	44.20	+19.57
Labor hold		Swing	−19.57	

=== Elections in the 2000s ===
2009 Queensland state election: Woodridge
Party	Candidate	Votes	%	±%
Labor	Desley Scott	17,300	68.8	+1.1
Liberal National	Sarina Patane	5,421	21.6	+3.5
Greens	John Reddington	2,408	9.6	+2.5
Total formal votes		25,129	96.8	
Informal votes		767	3.2	
Turnout		25,896	88.1	
Two-party-preferred result
Labor	Desley Scott	18,047	75.4	−1.8
Liberal National	Sarina Patane	5,896	24.6	+1.8
Labor hold		Swing	−1.8	

2006 Queensland state election: Woodridge
Party	Candidate	Votes	%	±%
Labor	Desley Scott	14,257	69.0	−1.3
Liberal	Sarina Patane	3,354	16.2	−2.1
Family First	Jamie Pentsa	1,646	8.0	+8.0
Greens	John Reddington	1,393	6.7	−4.6
Total formal votes		20,650	96.3	−0.2
Informal votes		788	3.7	+0.2
Turnout		21,438	87.5	−1.8
Two-party-preferred result
Labor	Desley Scott	15,080	79.0	+1.1
Liberal	Sarina Patane	4,012	21.0	−1.1
Labor hold		Swing	+1.1	

2004 Queensland state election: Woodridge
Party	Candidate	Votes	%	±%
Labor	Desley Scott	14,719	70.3	+13.0
Liberal	Dilys Bradbury	3,834	18.3	+12.1
Greens	James Brown	2,371	11.3	+11.3
Total formal votes		20,924	96.5	−0.8
Informal votes		761	3.5	+0.8
Turnout		21,685	89.3	−1.8
Two-party-preferred result
Labor	Desley Scott	15,360	77.9	+6.8
Liberal	Dilys Bradbury	4,346	22.1	+22.1
Labor hold		Swing	+6.8	

2001 Queensland state election: Woodridge
Party	Candidate	Votes	%	±%
Labor	Desley Scott	11,992	57.3	+5.5
One Nation	Alice Ngahooro	4,336	20.7	−8.3
Independent	John Grant	2,273	10.9	+10.9
Liberal	Jane Simon	1,272	6.1	−2.0
Independent	Jody Moore	1,057	5.1	+5.1
Total formal votes		20,930	97.3	
Informal votes		579	2.7	
Turnout		21,509	91.1	
Two-candidate-preferred result
Labor	Desley Scott	13,138	71.1	+9.1
One Nation	Alice Ngahooro	5,346	28.9	−9.1
Labor hold		Swing	+9.1	

2000 Woodridge state by-election
Party	Candidate	Votes	%	±%
Labor	Mike Kaiser	7,635	50.79	−0.87
Independent	Russell Lutton	5,012	33.34	+33.34
Liberal	Irene Allan	1,340	8.91	−5.08
Independent	Nigel Freemarijuana	386	2.57	+2.57
Democrats	Robert Hernandez	337	2.24	−3.71
Independent	Gary Wilkins	275	1.83	+1.83
Independent	John McKenna	47	0.31	+0.31
Total formal votes		15,032	97.56	
Informal votes		376	2.44	
Turnout		15,408	85.21	
Two-candidate-preferred result
Labor	Mike Kaiser	7,955	56.49	−7.0
Independent	Russell Lutton	6,126	43.51	+43.51
Labor hold		Swing	N/A	

=== Elections in the 1990s ===
1998 Queensland state election: Woodridge
Party	Candidate	Votes	%	±%
Labor	Bill D'Arcy	8,009	51.7	−9.9
One Nation	Leonce Kealy	4,401	28.4	+28.4
Liberal	Adam Young	2,169	14.0	−11.5
Democrats	Robert Hernandez	923	6.0	+6.0
Total formal votes		15,502	97.4	+0.5
Informal votes		410	2.6	−0.5
Turnout		15,912	90.5	+3.2
Two-candidate-preferred result
Labor	Bill D'Arcy	8,791	63.5	−4.6
One Nation	Leonce Kealy	5,048	36.5	+36.5
Labor hold		Swing	−4.6	

1995 Queensland state election: Woodridge
Party	Candidate	Votes	%	±%
Labor	Bill D'Arcy	9,730	61.6	−4.6
Liberal	Matthew Cavanagh	4,026	25.5	+9.3
Independent	Anthony Davis	2,042	12.9	+12.9
Total formal votes		15,798	96.9	+1.3
Informal votes		499	3.1	−1.3
Turnout		16,297	87.3	
Two-party-preferred result
Labor	Bill D'Arcy	10,390	68.1	−7.0
Liberal	Matthew Cavanagh	4,858	31.9	+7.0
Labor hold		Swing	−7.0	

1992 Queensland state election: Woodridge
Party	Candidate	Votes	%	±%
Labor	Bill D'Arcy	11,117	66.2	−4.4
Liberal	Debbie Planincic	2,719	16.2	−2.5
Independent	Graeme Collins	1,821	10.8	+10.8
Indigenous Peoples	Col Smith	572	3.4	+3.4
Indigenous Peoples	Linette Van Issum	570	3.4	+3.4
Total formal votes		16,799	95.6	
Informal votes		771	4.4	
Turnout		17,570	88.1	
Two-party-preferred result
Labor	Bill D'Arcy	11,824	75.2	+3.9
Liberal	Debbie Planincic	3,905	24.8	−3.9
Labor hold		Swing	+3.9	

=== Elections in the 1980s ===
1989 Queensland state election: Woodridge
Party	Candidate	Votes	%	±%
Labor	Bill D'Arcy	13,504	68.7	+16.4
Liberal	Graeme Collins	3,935	20.0	+7.4
National	Tom Trethewey	2,208	11.2	−11.4
Total formal votes		19,647	95.4	−1.7
Informal votes		953	4.6	+1.7
Turnout		20,600	88.0	−0.1
Two-party-preferred result
Labor	Bill D'Arcy	13,655	69.5	+8.5
Liberal	Graeme Collins	5,992	30.5	+30.5
Labor hold		Swing	+8.5	

1986 Queensland state election: Woodridge
Party	Candidate	Votes	%	±%
Labor	Bill D'Arcy	8,977	52.3	+3.4
National	Jon Cooper	3,888	22.7	−10.9
Liberal	Graeme Collins	2,170	12.6	+3.2
Independent	Graham Able	1,992	11.6	+11.6
Socialist Labour	Kenneth Mantell	138	0.8	+0.3
Total formal votes		17,165	97.1	
Informal votes		511	2.9	
Turnout		17,676	88.1	
Two-party-preferred result
Labor	Bill D'Arcy	10,471	61.0	−1.9
National	Jon Cooper	6,694	39.0	+1.9
Labor hold		Swing	−1.9	

1983 Queensland state election: Woodridge
Party	Candidate	Votes	%	±%
Labor	Bill D'Arcy	11,131	48.9	+2.6
National	Selma Elson	7,648	33.6	+33.6
Liberal	Derek Richards	2,133	9.4	−25.6
Democrats	Michael van de Velde	1,616	7.1	−0.5
Socialist	Ray Ferguson	132	0.6	+0.6
Socialist Labour	Katherine Gillick	121	0.5	+0.5
Total formal votes		22,781	98.5	+0.6
Informal votes		354	1.5	−0.6
Turnout		23,135	91.2	+4.6
Two-party-preferred result
Labor	Bill D'Arcy	12,556	55.1	−1.3
National	Selma Elson	10,225	44.9	+1.3
Labor hold		Swing	−1.3	

1980 Queensland state election: Woodridge
Party	Candidate	Votes	%	±%
Labor	Bill D'Arcy	8,531	46.3	−3.1
Liberal	Douglas Dagleish	6,449	35.0	+2.1
Democrats	Robert Webb	1,404	7.6	+7.6
Independent	Anne Glew	921	5.0	+5.0
Independent	Jack Davis	737	4.0	+4.0
Independent	Robert Bartlett	378	2.1	+2.1
Total formal votes		18,420	97.9	−0.2
Informal votes		397	2.1	+0.2
Turnout		18,817	86.6	−4.0
Two-party-preferred result
Labor	Bill D'Arcy	10,395	56.4	+2.3
Liberal	Douglas Dagleish	8,025	43.6	−2.3
Labor hold		Swing	+2.3	

=== Elections in the 1970s ===
1977 Queensland state election: Woodridge
Party	Candidate	Votes	%	±%
Labor	Bill D'Arcy	7,654	49.4	
Liberal	Colin Lamont	5,093	32.9	
National	Douglas Ralston	2,066	13.3	
Independent	Albert Guest	671	4.3	
Total formal votes		15,484	98.1	
Informal votes		306	1.9	
Turnout		15,790	90.6	
Two-party-preferred result
Labor	Bill D'Arcy	8,371	54.1	+11.9
Liberal	Colin Lamont	7,113	45.9	−11.9
Labor gain from Liberal		Swing	+11.9	
