= 2000 Woodridge state by-election =

A by-election was held in the Legislative Assembly of Queensland seat of Woodridge on 5 February 2000. It was triggered by the resignation of sitting Labor member Bill D'Arcy. It was held concurrently with the Bundamba state by-election.

The seat was retained by Labor Party with the election of candidate Mike Kaiser.

== Background ==
Bill D'Arcy was first elected to state parliament as the Labor member for Albert at the 1972 state election. He lost his seat at the 1974 state election, a landslide defeat for Labor, but returned to parliament as the Labor member for the new seat of Woodridge at the 1977 state election and held the seat continuously thereafter.

D'Arcy resigned from parliament on 9 January 2000. It emerged shortly afterwards that D'Arcy was facing charges of child sex offences from his days as a school teacher. D'Arcy was later convicted and spent seven years in jail as a result.

== Candidates ==
To defend the seat, Labor preselected Mike Kaiser, then state secretary of the Queensland branch of the Labor Party. Kaiser's chief opponent was Logan City councillor Russell Lutton, standing as an independent but formerly a member of the Labor Party.

== Results ==
Kaiser won the normally safe seat for the Labor Party, with Lutton polling a strong second.

Woodridge state by-election, 2000
Party	Candidate	Votes	%	±%
Labor	Mike Kaiser	7,635	50.79	−0.87
Independent	Russell Lutton	5,012	33.34	+33.34
Liberal	Irene Allan	1,340	8.91	−5.08
	Nigel Freemarijuana	386	2.57	+2.57
Democrats	Robert Hernandez	337	2.24	−3.71
Independent	Gary Wilkins	275	1.83	+1.83
Independent	John McKenna	47	0.31	+0.31
Total formal votes		15,032	97.56	
Informal votes		376	2.44	
Turnout		15,408	85.21	
Two-candidate-preferred result
Labor	Mike Kaiser	7,955	56.49	−7.0
Independent	Russell Lutton	6,126	43.51	+43.51
Labor hold		Swing	N/A	

== Aftermath ==
Labor's retention of Woodridge and Bundamba ensured the government of Peter Beattie retained its one-seat majority in parliament.

Mike Kaiser's stint in parliament would be a short one. He confessed to the Shepherdson Inquiry—set up to investigate electoral fraud—that he signed a false enrolment form in 1986. He consequently resigned from the Labor Party in January 2001 to sit as an independent and did not contest the 2001 state election.

== See also ==
- List of Queensland state by-elections
