= Electoral results for the district of Macalister =

Electoral results of Macalister district in Queensland state election

This is a list of electoral results for the electoral district of Macalister in Queensland state elections.

== Members for Macalister ==
Member	Party	Term
Melissa McMahon	Labor	2017–present

== Election results ==
=== Elections in the 2020s ===
2024 Queensland state election: Macalister
Party	Candidate	Votes	%	±%
Labor	Melissa McMahon	13,631	40.82	−3.36
Liberal National	Rob van Manen	12,041	36.06	+8.92
Greens	Liam Johns	2,369	7.09	+0.89
One Nation	Cheree Cooper	2,327	6.97	−0.49
Legalise Cannabis	Meredith Brisk	1,568	4.70	+4.70
Family First	Paul Davis	1,457	4.36	+4.36
Total formal votes		33,393	94.63	+0.03
Informal votes		1,895	5.37	−0.03
Turnout		35,288	84.19	+0.59
Two-party-preferred result
Labor	Melissa McMahon	17,342	51.93	−7.61
Liberal National	Rob van Manen	16,051	48.07	+7.61
Labor hold		Swing	−7.61	

2020 Queensland state election: Macalister
Party	Candidate	Votes	%	±%
Labor	Melissa McMahon	12,896	44.18	+7.52
Liberal National	Judi van Manen	7,921	27.14	+0.49
Independent	Margaret Keech	3,020	10.35	+10.35
One Nation	Bronwyn Bye	2,178	7.46	+7.46
Greens	Kirsty Petersen	1,810	6.20	−0.45
Independent	Paul Taylor	714	2.45	+2.45
United Australia	David McClaer	348	1.19	+1.19
Civil Liberties & Motorists	Ben Musgrave	304	1.04	−2.25
Total formal votes		29,191	94.60	+1.21
Informal votes		1,667	5.40	−1.21
Turnout		30,858	83.60	−1.86
Two-party-preferred result
Labor	Melissa McMahon	17,381	59.54	+2.09
Liberal National	Judi van Manen	11,810	40.46	−2.09
Labor hold		Swing	+2.09	

=== Elections in the 2010s ===
2017 Queensland state election: Macalister
Party	Candidate	Votes	%	±%
Labor	Melissa McMahon	10,210	36.7	−8.1
Liberal National	Judi van Manen	7,421	26.6	−10.9
Independent	Hetty Johnston	6,448	23.2	+23.2
Greens	Gabi Nehring	1,851	6.6	−1.0
Consumer Rights	Ben Musgrave	917	3.3	+3.3
Independent	Greg Bradley	522	1.9	+1.9
Independent	Janelle Clancy	480	1.7	+1.7
Total formal votes		27,849	93.4	−3.8
Informal votes		1,973	6.6	+3.8
Turnout		29,822	85.5	+0.7
Two-party-preferred result
Labor	Melissa McMahon	15,999	57.4	+1.0
Liberal National	Judi van Manen	11,850	42.6	−1.0
Labor hold		Swing	+1.0	
