= Electoral results for the district of Theodore =

Queensland, Australia, district election results

This is a list of electoral results for the electoral district of Theodore in Queensland state elections.

== Members for Theodore ==
Member	Party	Term
Mark Boothman	Liberal National	2017–present

== Election results ==
=== Elections in the 2020s ===
2024 Queensland state election: Theodore
Party	Candidate	Votes	%	±%
Liberal National	Mark Boothman	15,875	49.6	+5.4
Labor	Rita Anwari	8,600	26.9	−11.3
One Nation	Cassandra Duffill	2,815	8.8	+1.7
Greens	Andrew Stimson	2,350	7.4	+0.4
Animal Justice	Chloe Snyman	1,412	4.4	+4.4
Family First	Eleanor McAlpine	928	2.9	+2.9
Total formal votes		31,980	95.3	
Informal votes		1,564	4.7	
Turnout		33,544		
Two-party-preferred result
Liberal National	Mark Boothman	20,137	63.0	+9.6
Labor	Rita Anwari	11,843	37.0	−9.6
Liberal National hold		Swing	+9.6	

2020 Queensland state election: Theodore
Party	Candidate	Votes	%	±%
Liberal National	Mark Boothman	13,320	44.21	+4.50
Labor	Tracey Bell	11,516	38.22	+6.75
One Nation	Anita Holland	2,152	7.14	−11.88
Greens	John Woodlock	2,083	6.91	−2.88
Independent	Gale Oxenford	618	2.05	+2.05
United Australia	Robert Marks	438	1.45	+1.45
Total formal votes		30,127	95.68	+1.05
Informal votes		1,360	4.32	−1.05
Turnout		31,487	88.34	+2.87
Two-party-preferred result
Liberal National	Mark Boothman	16,066	53.33	−0.40
Labor	Tracey Bell	14,061	46.67	+0.40
Liberal National hold		Swing	−0.40	

=== Elections in the 2010s ===
2017 Queensland state election: Theodore
Party	Candidate	Votes	%	±%
Liberal National	Mark Boothman	10,678	39.7	−5.4
Labor	Luz Stanton	8,462	31.5	+0.3
One Nation	Darrell Lane	5,114	19.0	+19.0
Greens	Tina Meni	2,634	9.8	+3.8
Total formal votes		26,888	94.6	−2.4
Informal votes		1,525	5.4	+2.4
Turnout		28,413	85.5	+5.1
Two-party-preferred result
Liberal National	Mark Boothman	14,445	53.7	−1.6
Labor	Luz Stanton	12,443	46.3	+1.6
Liberal National hold		Swing	−1.6	
