= Melissa McMahon =

Australian politician

Melissa McMahon MP

Member of the Queensland Legislative Assembly for Macalister
- Incumbent
- Assumed office 25 November 2017
- Preceded by: New seat

Personal details
- Born: 15 May 1976 (age 50) Brisbane, Queensland
- Party: Labor
- Children: 3
- Education: Griffith University; Charles Sturt University
- Occupation: Police officer Army officer
- Website: www.melissamcmahon.com.au

Military service
- Allegiance: Australia
- Branch/service: Australian Army
- Years of service: 1994–2017
- Rank: Major
- Battles/wars: Operation Astute

Melissa Fay McMahon (born 15 May 1976) is an Australian politician. She has been the Labor member for Macalister in the Queensland Legislative Assembly since 2017. She is a member of the Parliamentary Crime and Corruption Committee (PCCC) and the Legal Affairs and Community Safety Committee (LACSC) of the Queensland Parliament.

== Career ==
Prior to her election to the Queensland Parliament, McMahon was a major in the Australian Army working in CIMIC, military police, information operations and career management. She served overseas in Timor-Leste in 2008 and 2011. She was also a senior sergeant in the Queensland Police Service, having worked on the Gold Coast, Logan and Brisbane.

McMahon has bachelor's degrees in behavioural science, policing and secondary education with a diploma of public safety and qualifications in training and education.

In the 2015 Queensland state election she ran in the seat of Albert, gaining a two-party-preferred swing of 10%, but lost to incumbent Mark Boothman.

== Personal life ==
McMahon was the President of the Beenleigh Neighbourhood Centre but, as of 2026, is the Vice President. She has three children.

Parliament of Queensland
New seat	Member for Macalister; 2017–present	Incumbent
