= All Saints Memorial Church =

All Saints Memorial Church or All Saints' Memorial Church may refer to:

- All Saints Memorial Church, Tamrookum, Queensland, Australia
- All Saints' Memorial Church (Navesink, New Jersey)
- All Saints Memorial Church (Federal Hill, Providence, Rhode Island)

== See also ==
- All Saints Church (disambiguation)
