= Knapp Creek, Queensland =

Knapp Creek
- Suburb
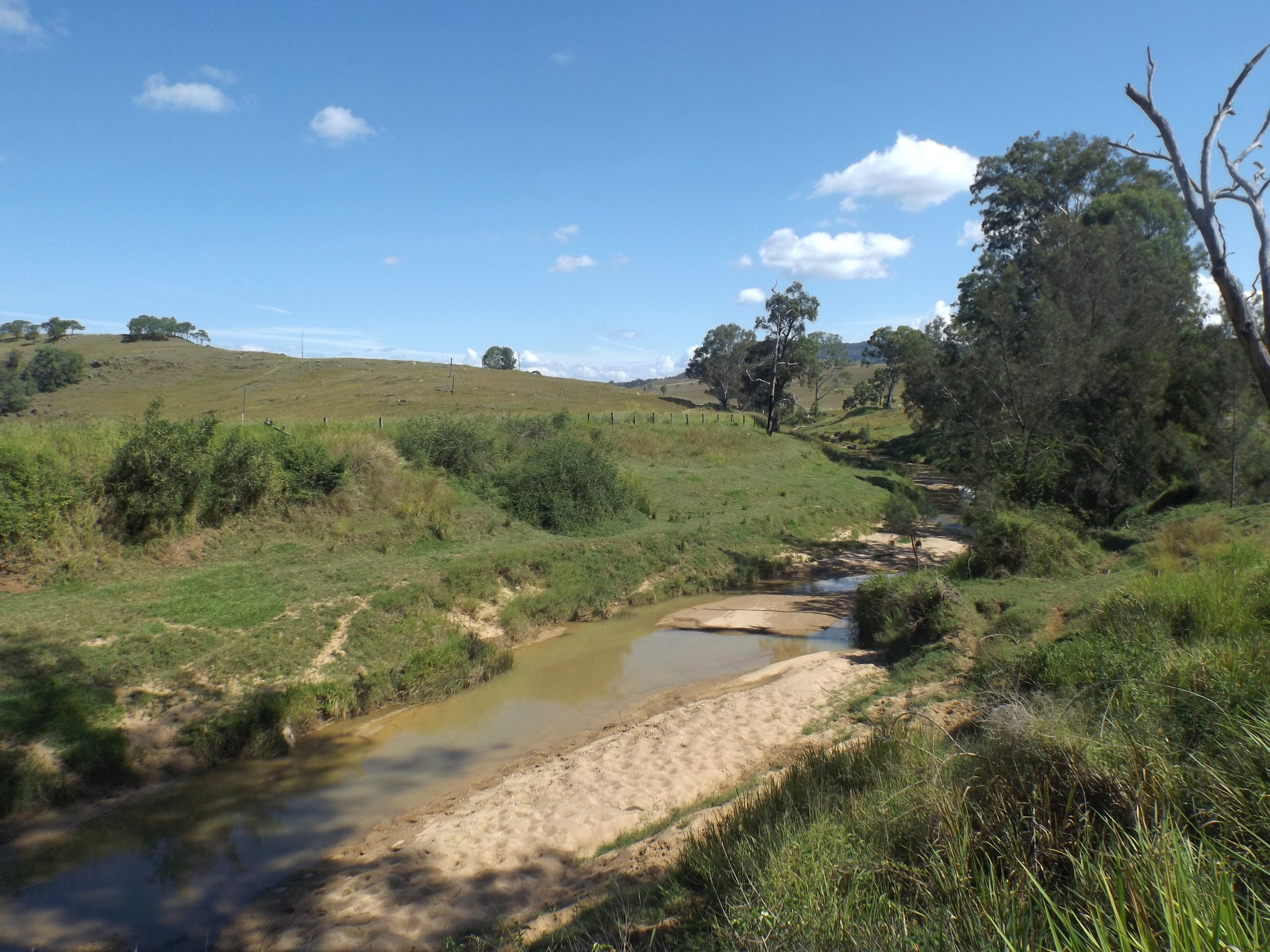
- Landscape along Knapp Creek Road, 2016

- Interactive map of Knapp Creek
- Coordinates: 28.1275°S 152.8066°E
- Country: Australia
- State: Queensland
- LGA: Scenic Rim Region
- Location: 29.7 km (18.5 mi) SW of Beaudesert; 98.9 km (61.5 mi) SSW of Brisbane

Government
  - State electorate: Scenic Rim
  - Federal division: Wright

Area
  - Total: 84.7 km^{2} (32.7 sq mi)

Population
  - Total: 59 (2021 census)
  - Density: 0.697/km^{2} (1.804/sq mi)
- Time zone: UTC+10:00 (AEST)
- Postcode: 4285
Suburbs around Knapp Creek
Cannon Creek	Kooralbyn	Laravale
Cannon Creek	Knapp Creek	Tamrookum
Maroon	Rathdowney; Tamrookum Creek	Innisplain

Knapp Creek is a rural locality in the Scenic Rim Region, Queensland, Australia. In the 2021 census, Knapp Creek had a population of 59 people.

== Geography ==
The locality is presumably named after Knapp Creek, a tributary of the Cannon River, which is in turn a tributary of the Logan River.

The locality has the following mountains:

- Knapps Peak (Miggun, Mount Hughes), in the south-west of the locality (28.1284°S 152.7485°E) 651 metres (2,136 ft)
- Prouts Hill, in the south-east of the locality (28.1497°S 152.8411°E) 459 metres (1,506 ft)

== History ==
Knapps Creek Provisional School opened circa 1884. On 1 January 1909 it became Knapps Creek State School, but then closed in 1910. It was south of the confluence of Knapps Creek and Cannon Creek, near the present-day boundaries of the localities of Knapps Creek, Laravale and Tamrookum (approx 28.11514°S 152.89442°E).

In 1979, Knapp Creek Environmental Park was gazetted under the Land Act of 1962.

== Demographics ==
In the 2016 census, Knapp Creek had a population of 59 people. The locality contains 29 households, in which 41.8% of the population are males and 58.2% of the population are females with a median age of 49, 11 years above the national average. The average weekly household income is $1,875, $437 above the national average.

In the 2021 census, Knapp Creek had a population of 59 people.

== Education ==
There are no schools in Knapp Creek. The nearest government primary schools are:

- Tamrookum State School in neighbouring Tamrookum to the north-east
- Rathdowney State School in neighbouring Rathdowney to south-east
- Maroon State School in neighbouring Maroon to the south-west
- Boonah State School in Boonah to the north-west

The nearest government secondary schools are Beaudesert State High School in Beaudesert to the north-east and Boonah State High School in Boonah to the north-west.
