= Tamrookum Creek =

- Suburb
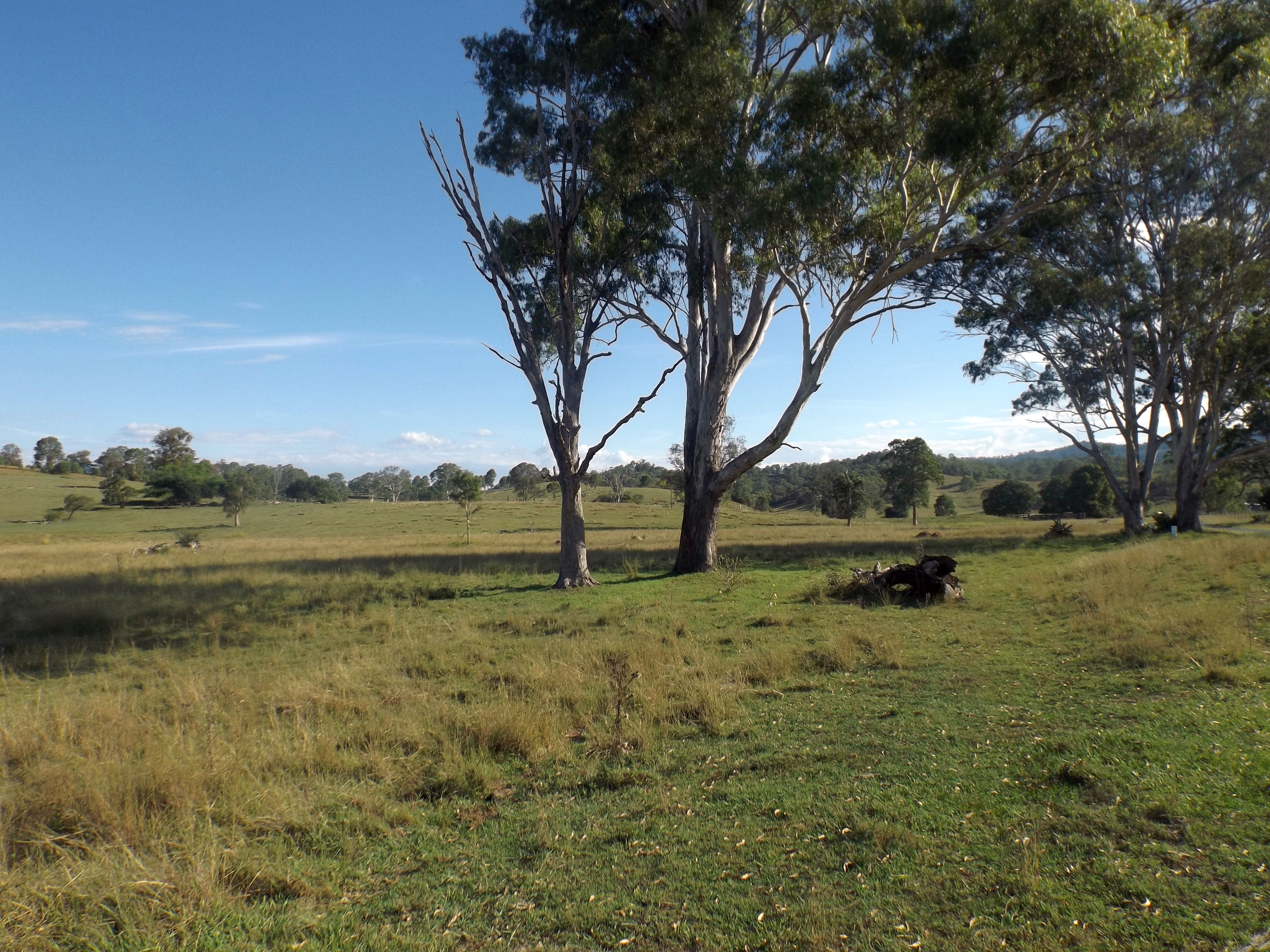
- Paddocks along Tamrookum Creek Road at Tamrookum Creek, 2016

- Interactive map of Tamrookum Creek
- Coordinates: 28.17°S 152.8394°E
- Country: Australia
- State: Queensland
- LGA: Scenic Rim Region
- Location: 12.0 km (7.5 mi) NW of Rathdowney; 32.0 km (19.9 mi) SSW of Beaudesert; 59.0 km (36.7 mi) SE of Boonah; 102 km (63 mi) S of Brisbane CBD

Government
  - State electorate: Scenic Rim
  - Federal division: Wright

Area
  - Total: 30.7 km^{2} (11.9 sq mi)
- Elevation: 75–430 m (246–1,411 ft)

Population
  - Total: 35 (2021 census)
  - Density: 1.140/km^{2} (2.95/sq mi)
- Time zone: UTC+10:00 (AEST)
- Postcode: 4285
Suburbs around Tamrookum Creek
Knapp Creek	Knapp Creek	Tamrookum
Rathdowney	Tamrookum Creek	Innisplain
Rathdowney	Rathdowney	Rathdowney

Tamrookum Creek is a rural locality in the Scenic Rim Region, Queensland, Australia. In the 2021 census, Tamrookum Creek had a population of 35 people.

== Geography ==
The elevation varies across the locality from 75 metres (246 ft) above sea level in the east of the locality through to 430 metres (1,410 ft) in the west of the locality. The watercourse Tamrookum Creek rises in the west of the locality and meanders to the east of the locality where it exits to Innisplain and becomes a tributary of the Logan River.

The Mount Lindesay Highway forms part of the eastern boundary of the locality, entering from the east (Innisplain) and exiting to the south-east (Rathdowney). Tamrookum Creek Road provides the only east-west access through the locality and loosely parallels the creek.

The land use in the lower elevations in the centre and east of the locality is grazing on native vegetation, while the land in the more mountainous western part of the locality is mostly undeveloped.

== History ==
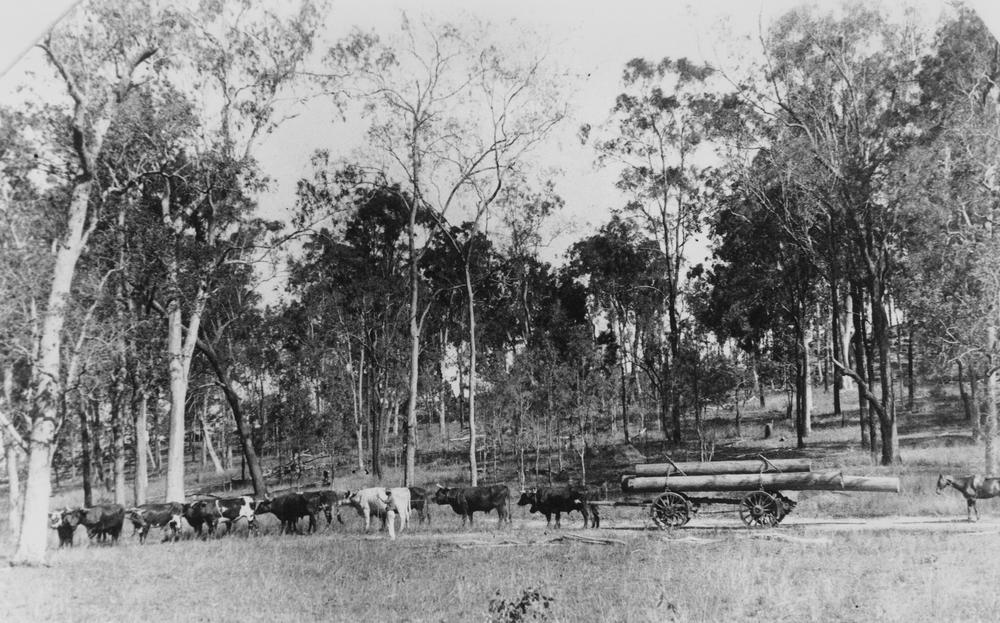
George Langdon's bullock team at Tamrookum Creek, 1917

The name Tamrookum is thought to be a corruption of the Aboriginal words (Bundjalung language, Yugumbir dialect) dhan/buragun meaning place of boomerangs.

Timber was an important early industry in the area. There was a sawmill at Tamrookum Creek from 1941 to 1949. This sawmill no longer exists.

== Demographics ==
In the 2016 census, Tamrookum Creek had a population of 32 people.

In the 2021 census, Tamrookum Creek had a population of 35 people.

== Education ==
There are no schools in Tamrookum Creek. The nearest government primary schools are Rathdowney State School in neighbouring Rathdowney to the south-east, Tamrookum State School in neighbouring Tamrookum to the north-east, and Maroon State School in Maroon to the west. The nearest government secondary schools are Beaudesert State High School in Beaudesert to the north-east and Boonah State High School in Boonah to the north-west.

There are also non-government schools in Kooralbyn to the north and in Beaudesert and Boonah.
