= Tamrookum, Queensland =

Tamrookum
- Suburb
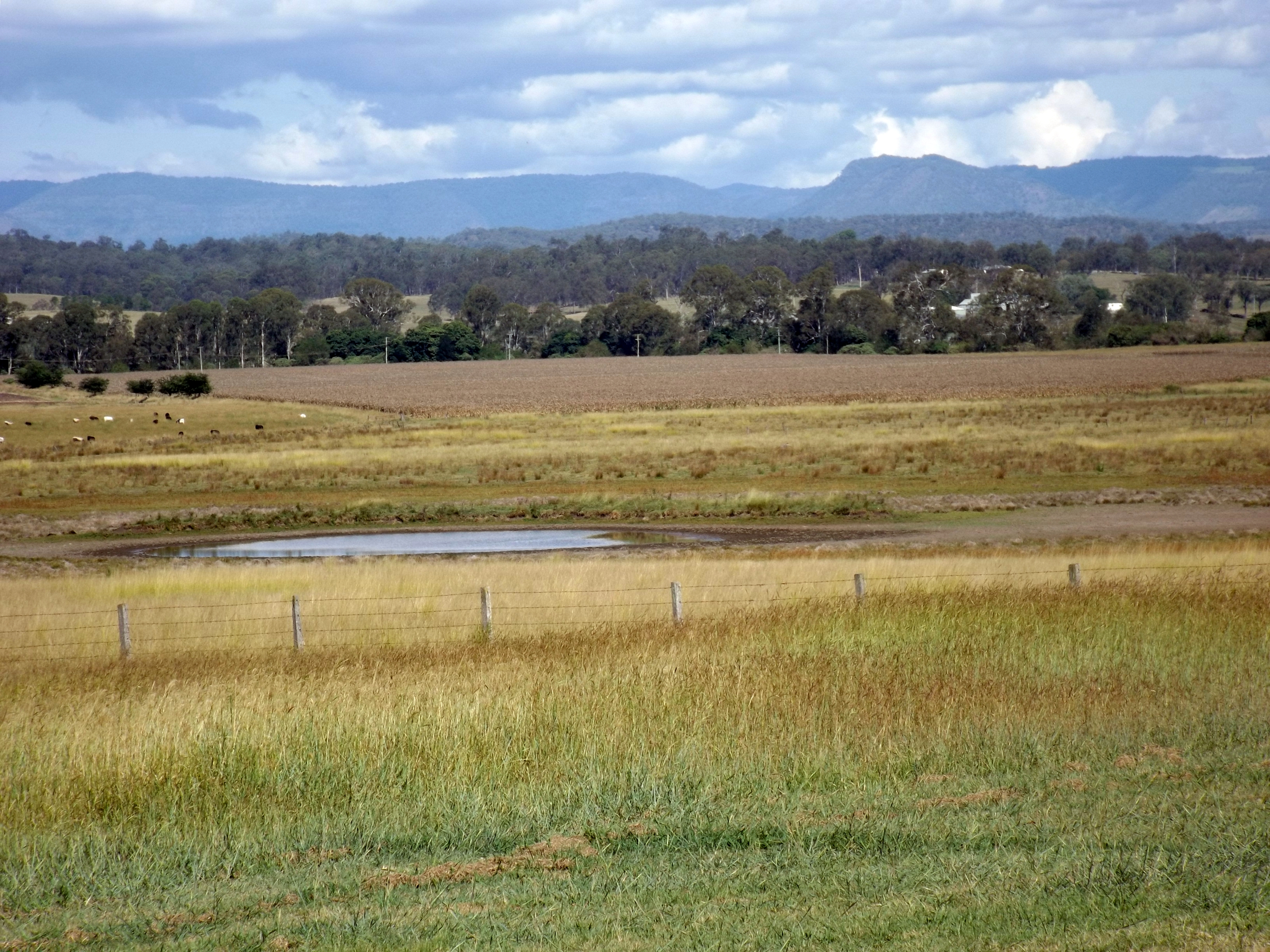
- Fields, 2016

- Interactive map of Tamrookum
- Coordinates: 28.1222°S 152.9136°E
- Country: Australia
- State: Queensland
- LGA: Scenic Rim Region
- Location: 20.5 km (12.7 mi) SSW of Beaudesert; 83.3 km (51.8 mi) W of Southport; 88.8 km (55.2 mi) SW of Brisbane

Government
  - State electorate: Scenic Rim
  - Federal division: Wright

Area
  - Total: 19.1 km^{2} (7.4 sq mi)

Population
  - Total: 94 (2021 census)
  - Density: 4.92/km^{2} (12.75/sq mi)
- Time zone: UTC+10:00 (AEST)
- Postcode: 4285
Suburbs around Tamrookum
Laravale	Laravale	Laravale
Knapp Creek	Tamrookum	Tabooba
Tamrookun Creek	Innisplain	Innisplain

Tamrookum is a rural locality in the Scenic Rim Region, Queensland, Australia. In the 2021 census, Tamrookum had a population of 94 people.

== Geography ==
The Mount Lindesay Highway traverses Tamrookum from north (Laravale) to south (Innisplain) and forms part of the north-west boundary. The Logan River forms its eastern boundary.

The Sydney–Brisbane rail corridor also passes through the locality from north to south to the west of the highway with Tamrookum railway station at 28.1194°S 152.9167°E.

A series of vegetated hills in the west rises to elevations of up to 150 metres (490 ft).

In the east adjacent to the river the predominant land use is irrigated cropping and irrigated pasture for grazing. In the west the principal land use is grazing on native vegetation.

== History ==
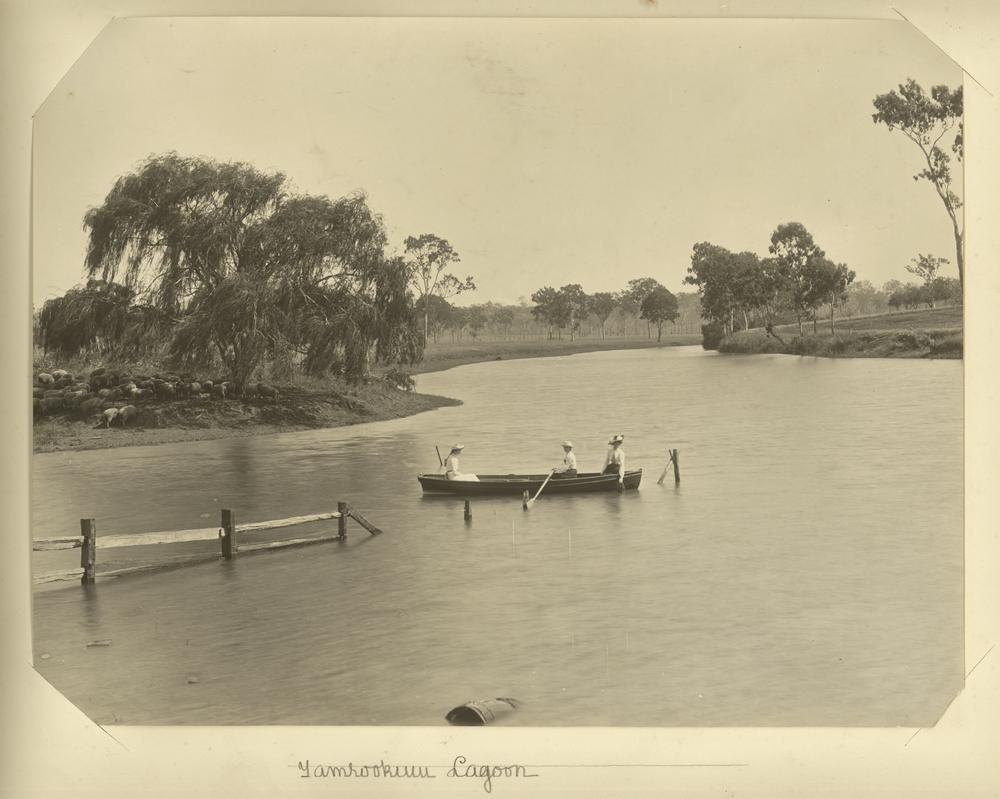
Tamrookum Lagoon, 1903

The name Tamrookum is believed to be a corruption of the Aboriginal words (from the Yugumbeh language) dhan/buragun meaning place of boomerangs.

The first Tamrookum squatter was John Campbell and the lessee from 1848 was William Barker. In 1872 he paid £325 for portion 343 and was issued with a Deed of Grant for 1,000 acres (400 ha) which included the homestead (demolished in 1931) and church site.

Pastoralist John Collins of Mundoolun acquired the land in 1878 and in 1879 his eldest son Robert Martin Collins took up residence after his marriage to Arabella Smyth. RM Collins became the owner in 1886.

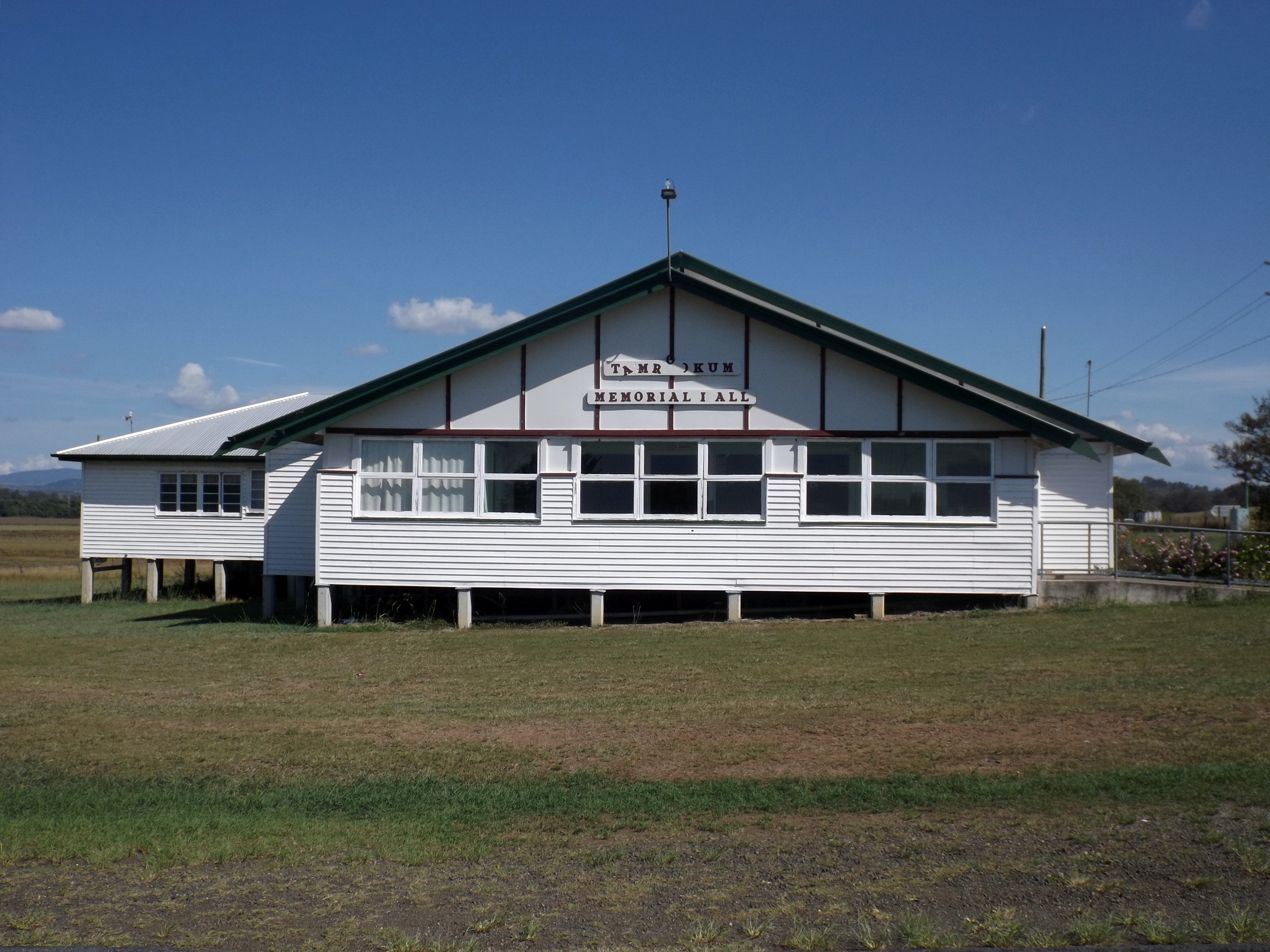
Tamrookum Memorial Hall, 2016

RM Collins and his brothers established vast pastoral interests in Queensland and the Northern Territory. He was a founding partner in the North Australian Pastoral Company and a pioneer of the frozen meat industry. He was a parliamentarian from 1896 to 1913 and was responsible for the establishment of Lamington National Park, proclaimed in 1915 after his death.

Following the death of RM Collins in 1913, his family constructed an Anglican church in his memory (Collins had chosen the site prior to his death). All Saint's Memorial Church was dedicated on 31 August 1915 by Archbishop St Clair Donaldson.

Tamrookum State School opened on 31 January 1939.

In October 1944, a meeting of local residents decided to construct memorial hall. However, the project took some years and the Tamrookum Memorial Hall finally opened on 5 April 1952.

== Demographics ==
In the 2011 census, Tamrookum and surrounds had a population of 266 people.

In the 2016 census, Tamrookum had a population of 91 people.

In the 2021 census, Tamrookum had a population of 94 people.

== Heritage listings ==
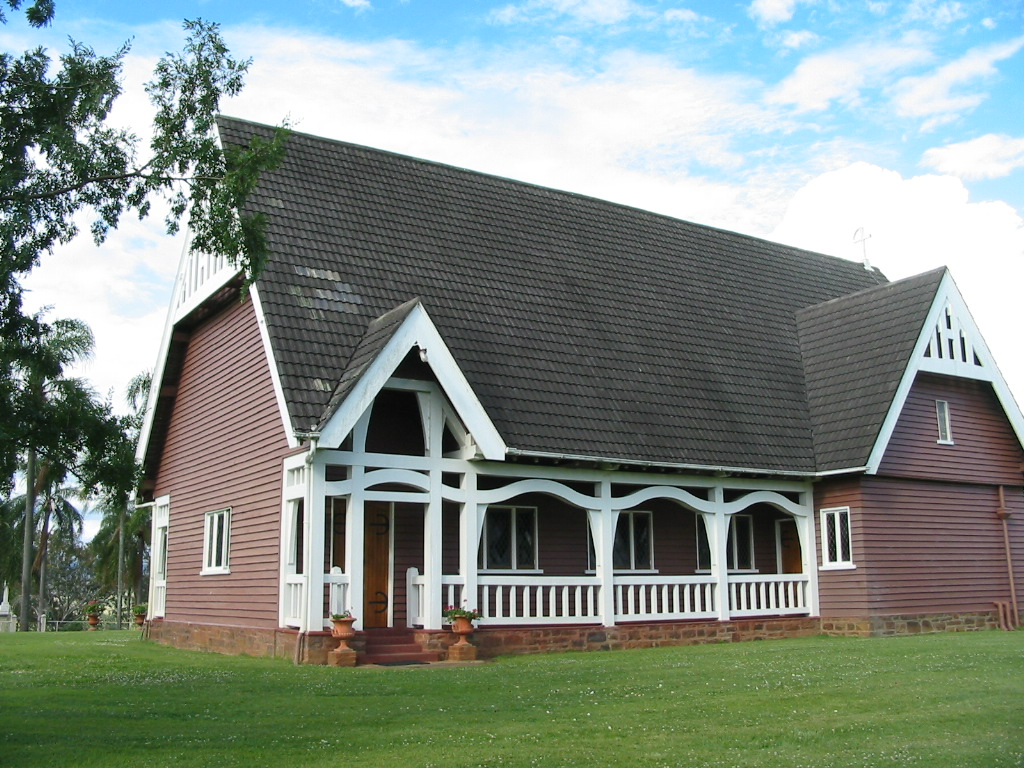
All Saints Anglican Church, 2005

Tamrookum has a number of heritage-listed sites, including:

- Tamrookum Church Road: All Saints Memorial Church

== Education ==
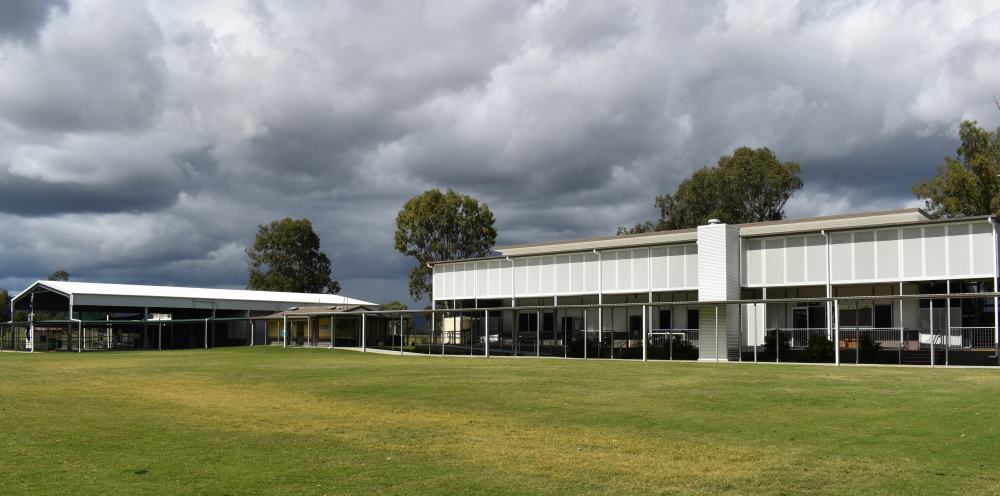
Tamrookum State School, 2025

Tamrookum State School is a government primary (Prep-6) school for boys and girls at 9019 Mount Lindesay Highway (28.1064°S 152.9155°E). In 2017, the school had an enrolment of 141 students with 15 teachers (8 full-time equivalent) and 12 non-teaching staff (7 full-time equivalent). There are no secondary schools in Tamrookum; the nearest government secondary school is Beaudesert State High School in Beaudesert.

== Amentities ==
Tamrookum has a roadhouse and general store, located on the eastern side of the Mount Lindsay Highway.

Anglican services are held once a month at All Saints Memorial Church at Tamrookum Church Road (28.1236°S 152.9227°E).

Tamrookum Memorial Hall is on the corner of the Mount Lindesday Highway and Tamrookrum Church Road (28.1233°S 152.9173°E).
