= 2000 Bundamba state by-election =

A by-election was held in the Legislative Assembly of Queensland seat of Bundamba on 5 February 2000. It was triggered by the resignation of sitting Labor member Bob Gibbs. It was held concurrently with the Woodridge state by-election.

The seat was retained by Labor Party with the election of candidate Jo-Ann Miller.

== Background ==
Bob Gibbs first entered parliament at the 1977 state election when he was elected as the Labor member for the seat of Wolston. Wolston was abolished at the 1992 state election, partly replaced by the new seat of Bundamba which Gibbs won and held thereafter. Typically a safe Labor seat, the rise of One Nation at the 1998 state election made the contest for Bundamba closer than usual; Gibbs prevailed with 56.2% of the two party preferred vote.

On 14 December 2000, Gibbs announced his resignation from parliament in order to become Queensland's North American Trade Commissioner.

== Results ==
In the absence of a One Nation candidate—Heather Hill represented the One Nation breakaway faction that would later be registered as the City Country Alliance—the major parties' share of the vote increased. Consequently, the seat reverted to its typical safe Labor status.

Bundamba state by-election, 2000
Party	Candidate	Votes	%	±%
Labor	Jo-Ann Miller	11,217	57.25	+9.09
Liberal	Michele Cole	2,909	14.85	+2.98
	Heather Hill	2,723	13.90	+13.90
Greens	Sean Curley	1,134	5.79	+2.84
Independent	Colene Hughes	870	4.44	+4.44
Independent	Bill Heck	564	2.88	+2.88
Independent	Martin Poole	177	0.90	+0.90
Total formal votes		19,594	97.04	
Informal votes		597	2.96	
Turnout		20,191	84.74	
Two-party-preferred result
Labor	Jo-Ann Miller	12,383	71.07	+14.9
Liberal	Michele Cole	5,041	28.93	+28.93
Labor hold		Swing	N/A	

== Aftermath ==
Labor's retention of Bundamba and Woodridge meant that the government of Peter Beattie retained its one-seat majority in parliament.

== See also ==
- List of Queensland state by-elections
