= Laravale, Queensland =

Laravale
- Town
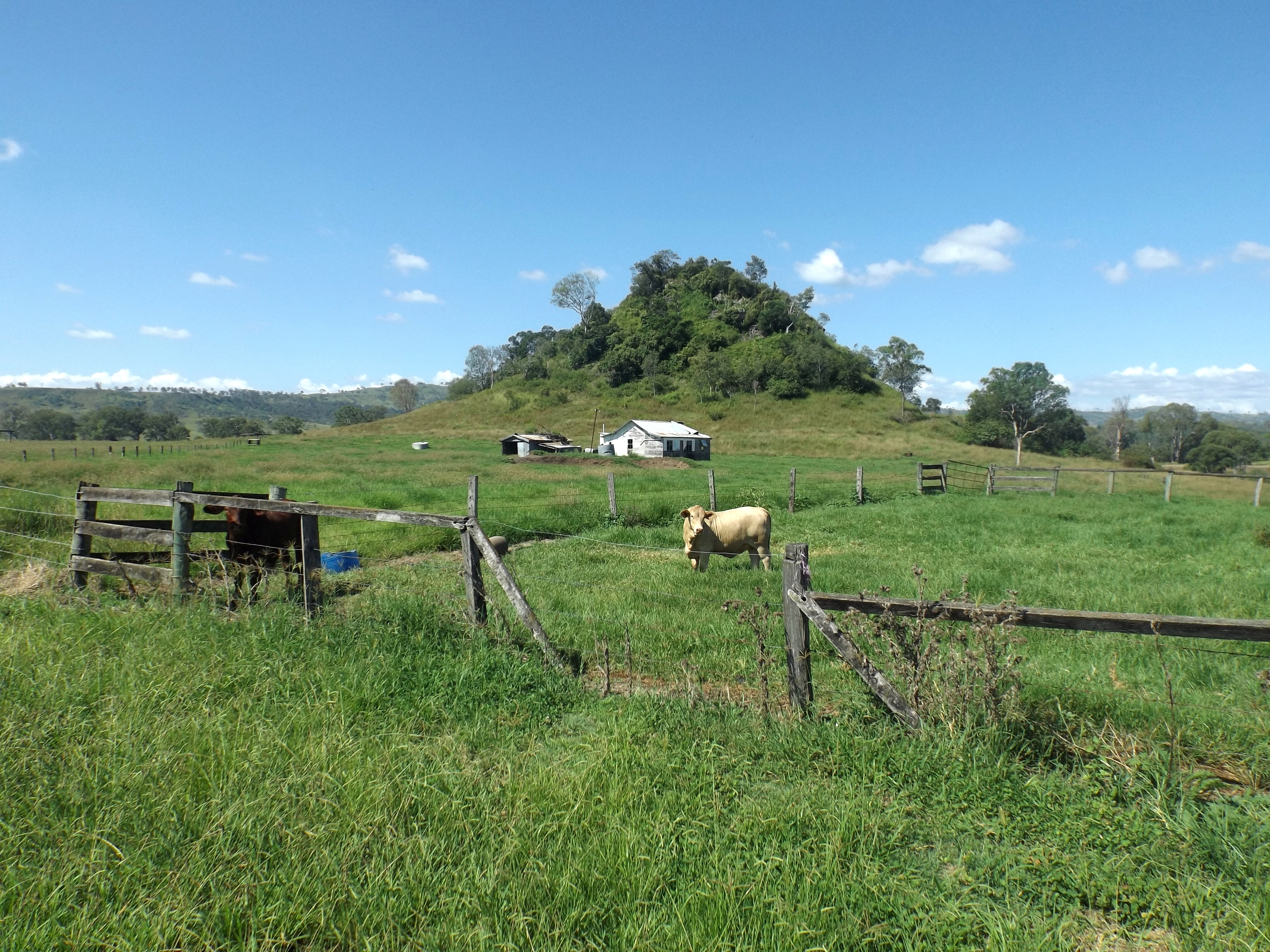
- Round Mountain, 2016

- Interactive map of Laravale
- Coordinates: 28.09°S 152.9330°E
- Country: Australia
- State: Queensland
- LGA: Scenic Rim Region
- Location: 14.2 km (8.8 mi) SW of Beaudesert; 83.4 km (51.8 mi) S of Brisbane CBD

Government
  - State electorate: Scenic Rim
  - Federal division: Wright

Area
  - Total: 57.1 km^{2} (22.0 sq mi)

Population
  - Total: 185 (2021 census)
  - Density: 3.240/km^{2} (8.391/sq mi)
- Time zone: UTC+10:00 (AEST)
- Postcode: 4285
Localities around Laravale
Josephville	Josephville	Cryna
Kooralbyn	Laravale	Kerry
Knapp Creek	Tabooba; Tamrookum	Tabooba

Laravale is a rural locality in the Scenic Rim Region, Queensland, Australia. In the 2021 census, the locality of Laravale had a population of 185 people.

== Geography ==
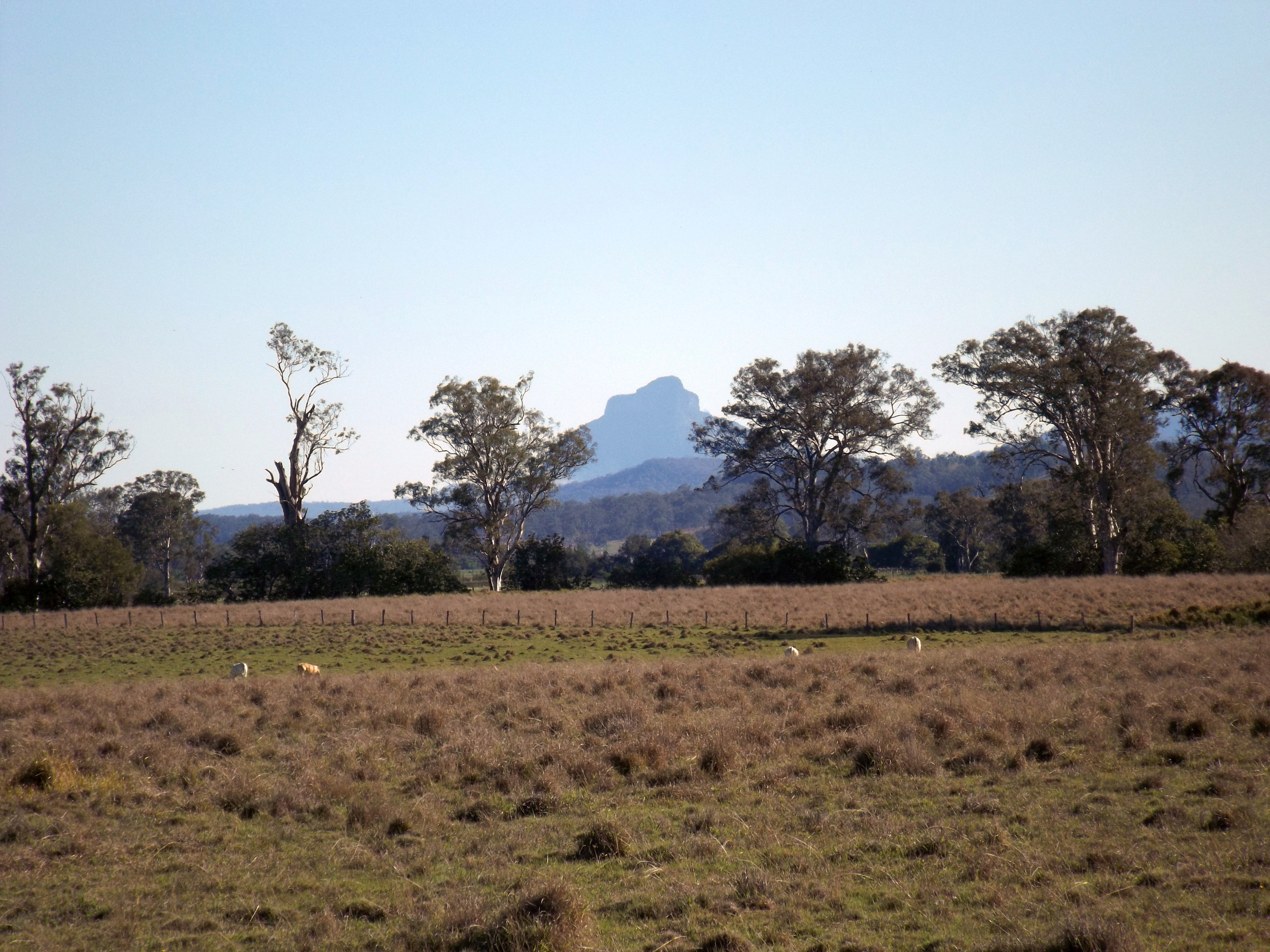
Mount Lindesay seen from Laravale, 2014

Part of the southern border is marked by the Christmas Creek, the Logan River and the Mount Lindesay Highway.

Round Mountain is in the north of the locality (28.0730°S 152.9225°E) rising to 109 metres (358 ft).

In the east of the locality, the terrain is elevated above 350 metres (1,150 ft) above sea level. Agriculture, including dairying, has developed in the more fertile areas adjacent to the Logan River.

The Sydney–Brisbane rail corridor also passes through the locality.

== History ==
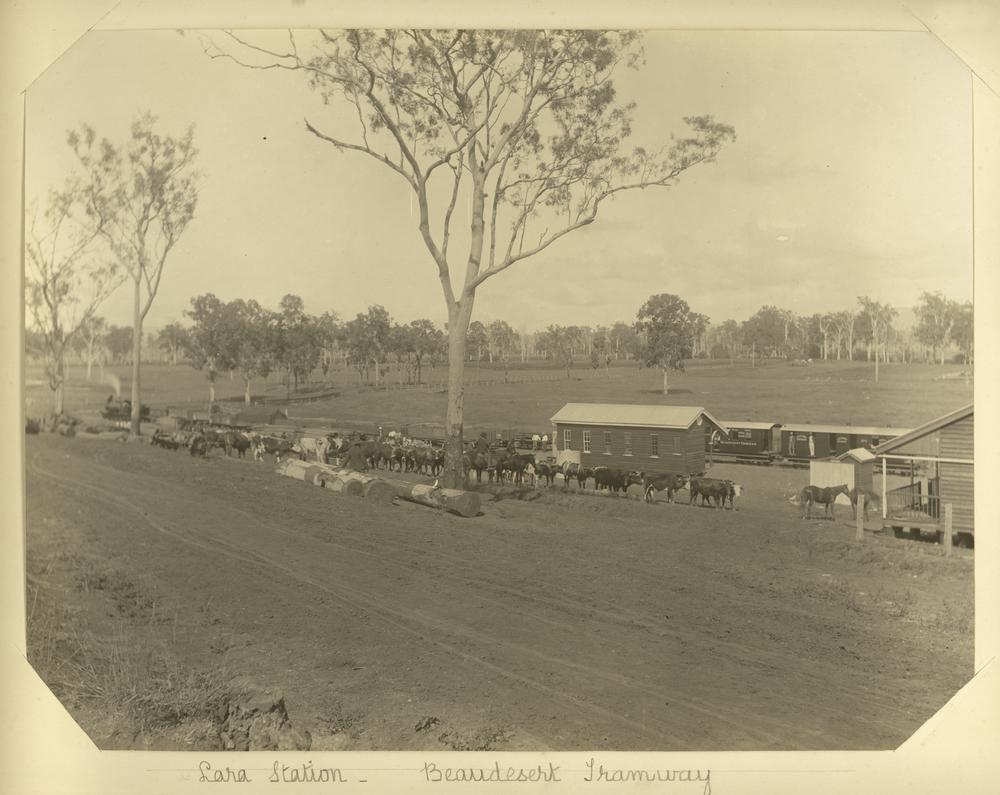
Lara station on the Beaudesert Tramway

Errisvale Provisional School opened on 22 February 1900. In 1907 it was renamed Laravale Provisional School. On 1 January 1909 it became Laravale State School. The school was mothballed on 31 December 2007 and then closed on 31 December 2010. The school was located at 73-77 Christmas Creek Road (28.0926°S 152.9376°E).

The Beaudesert Shire Tramway had a stop at Laravale (28.0863°S 152.9354°E).

St Stephen's Catholic Church was officially opened on Sunday 18 February 1923 by Archbishop James Duhig in the presence of 400 people. About 160 people came on a special train for the event. It was built on a 2-acre (0.81 ha) parcel of land donated by Henry Bruxner. It was immediately north of the school at 63 Christmas Creek (28.0920°S 152.9370°E). On 28 July 2003, the church building was relocated to St Augustine's College at Augustine Heights, where it now serves as St Monica's Chapel for use by both the school and the wider Catholic community.

Prior to 2008, it was part of Beaudesert Shire.

== Demographics ==
In the 2016 census, the locality of Laravale had a population of 189 people. The locality contains 86 households, in which 50.5% of the population are males and 49.5% of the population are females with a median age of 40, 2 years above the national average. The average weekly household income is $1,321, $117 below the national average. 0.0% of Laravale's population is either of Aborigional or Torres Strait Islander descent. 61.4% of the population aged 15 or over is either registered or de facto married, while 38.6% of the population is not married. 24.2% of the population is currently attending some form of a compulsory education. The most common nominated ancestries were Australian (33.2%), English (31.0%) and Scottish (12.2%), while the most common country of birth was Australia (91.1%), and the most commonly spoken language at home was English (93.7%). The most common nominated religions were Catholic (27.6%), No religion (21.8%) and Anglican (16.7%). The most common occupation was a manager (22.4%) and the majority/plurality of residents worked 40 or more hours per week (48.3%).

In the 2021 census, the locality of Laravale had a population of 185 people.

== Education ==
There are no schools in Laravale. The nearest government primary school is Tamrookum State School in neighbouring Tamrookum to the south. The nearest government secondary school is Beaudesert State High School in Beaudesert to the north-east.

== Attractions ==
Cotters Lookout is in the west of the locality (28.0797°S 152.8910°E).

== See also ==
- List of tramways in Queensland
