= Margaret Keech =

Australian politician

The Honourable Margaret Keech

Queensland Government Chief Whip
- In office 3 April 2009 – 23 March 2012
- Premier: Anna Bligh
- Preceded by: Carolyn Male
- Succeeded by: Vaughan Johnson

Minister for Child Safety of Queensland
- In office 13 September 2007 – 3 April 2009
- Premier: Anna Bligh
- Preceded by: Desley Boyle
- Succeeded by: Phil Reeves

Minister for Women of Queensland
- In office 1 November 2006 – 3 April 2009
- Premier: Peter Beattie; Anna Bligh
- Preceded by: Linda Lavarch
- Succeeded by: Karen Struthers

Minister for Tourism, Fair Trading and Wine Industry Development of Queensland
- In office 12 February 2004 – 13 September 2007
- Premier: Peter Beattie
- Preceded by: Merri Rose
- Succeeded by: Desley Boyle

Member of the Queensland Legislative Assembly for Albert
- In office 17 February 2001 – 23 March 2012
- Preceded by: Bill Baumann
- Succeeded by: Mark Boothman

Personal details
- Born: 18 September 1954 (age 72) Bundaberg, Queensland, Australia
- Party: Independent
- Other political affiliations: Labor (until 2020)
- Spouse: Peter
- Children: 3
- Occupation: Teacher, Lecturer

Margaret Majella Keech (born 18 September 1954) is a former Australian Labor Party politician who served as a minister in the Cabinet of Queensland, the Government Whip, and the Member of Parliament for Albert between 2001 and 2012.

== Early life and career ==
Prior to entering Parliament, Keech was a language and learning advisor for international students, ranging from kindergartners to post-doctoral students at the Queensland University of Technology. She also has a small business background and is a member of the Beenleigh Yatala Chamber of Commerce and the Australian Services Union. In 1981, Keech started the first public playgroup in Beenleigh and later established the popular Sunday craft market in Main St. She was also the co-founder of the local Residents Association and was chair of the Beenleigh Police District Community Consultative Committee.

She has a Master of Arts, a Bachelor of Economics, a Graduate Diploma in Teaching and a Graduate Diploma in Applied Linguistics.

== Member of parliament ==
In 2001, she was the first woman elected to represent Albert in the Legislative Assembly of Queensland.

She was Labor's Caucus Secretary from 28 March 2001 to February 2004.

=== Government Minister ===
Keech served as Minister for Tourism, Fair Trading and Wine Industry Development in the Beattie Ministry from March 2004, taking on the additional role of Minister for Women in November 2006.

When Anna Bligh installed her Ministry in September 2007, Keech was appointed Minister for Child Safety and Women. She was made Government Whip in March 2009, in which role she served until she lost her seat at the 2012 to Mark Boothman.

== Post parliamentary career ==
In July 2020, Keech resigned from the Labor Party to contest the state seat of Macalister as an independent at the 2020 Queensland state election. She was ultimately unsuccessful, finishing third with 10.41% of the vote.

== Personal life ==
Keech and her husband Peter and their three children, James, Joshua and Helen, have lived in Albert since 1980.

== See also ==
- Members of the Queensland Legislative Assembly, 2001–2004
- Members of the Queensland Legislative Assembly, 2004–2006
- Members of the Queensland Legislative Assembly, 2006–2009
- Members of the Queensland Legislative Assembly, 2009–2012

Parliament of Queensland
Preceded by Bill Baumann	Member for Albert; 2001–2012	Succeeded by Mark Boothman
