= All Saints Memorial Church, Tamrookum =

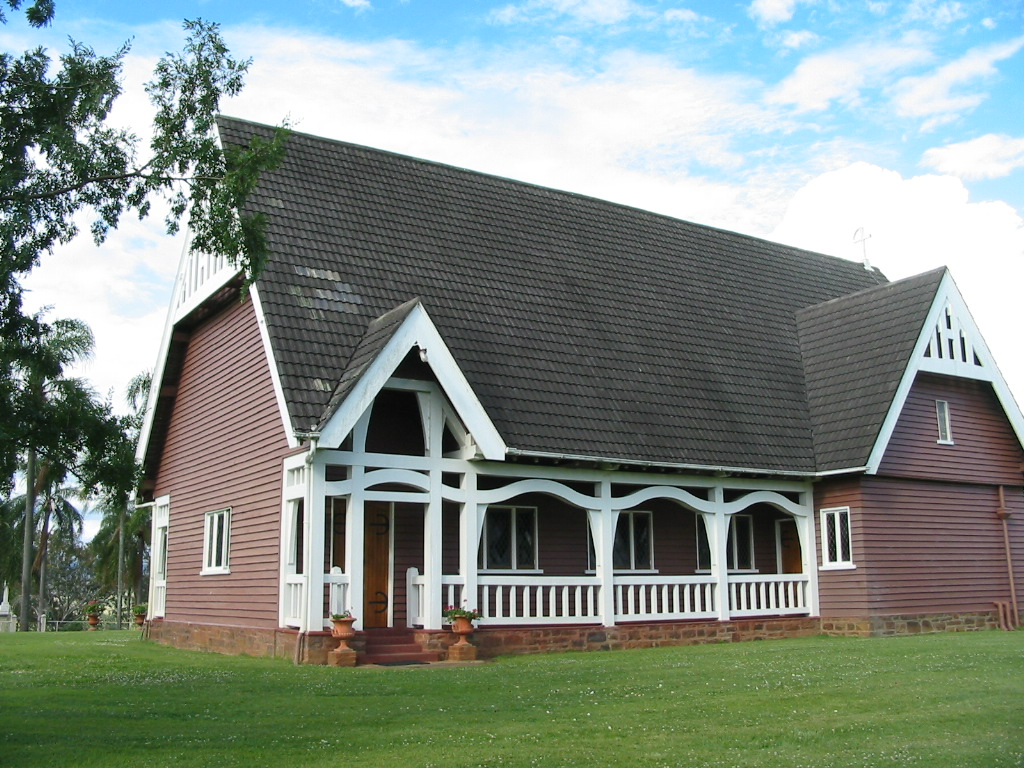
- Tamrookum All Saints Anglican Church, 2005

- Location within Queensland Location within Australia
- 28.1235°S 152.9229°E
- Location: Tamrookum Church Road, Tamrookum, Scenic Rim Region, Queensland, Australia

History
- Design period: 1914 - 1919 (World War I)
- Built: 1915

Site notes
- Architect: Robin Dods

Queensland Heritage Register
- Official name: All Saints Memorial Church
- Type: state heritage (built)
- Designated: 21 October 1992
- Reference no.: 600030
- Significant period: 1915 (fabric)
- Significant components: plaque, trees/plantings, fence/wall - perimeter, graveyard, garden - ornamental/flower, furniture/fittings, gate - entrance, stained glass window/s

All Saints Memorial Church is a heritage-listed Anglican church at Tamrookum Church Road, Tamrookum, Scenic Rim Region, Queensland, Australia. It was designed by Robin Dods and built in 1915. It was added to the Queensland Heritage Register on 21 October 1992.

== History ==
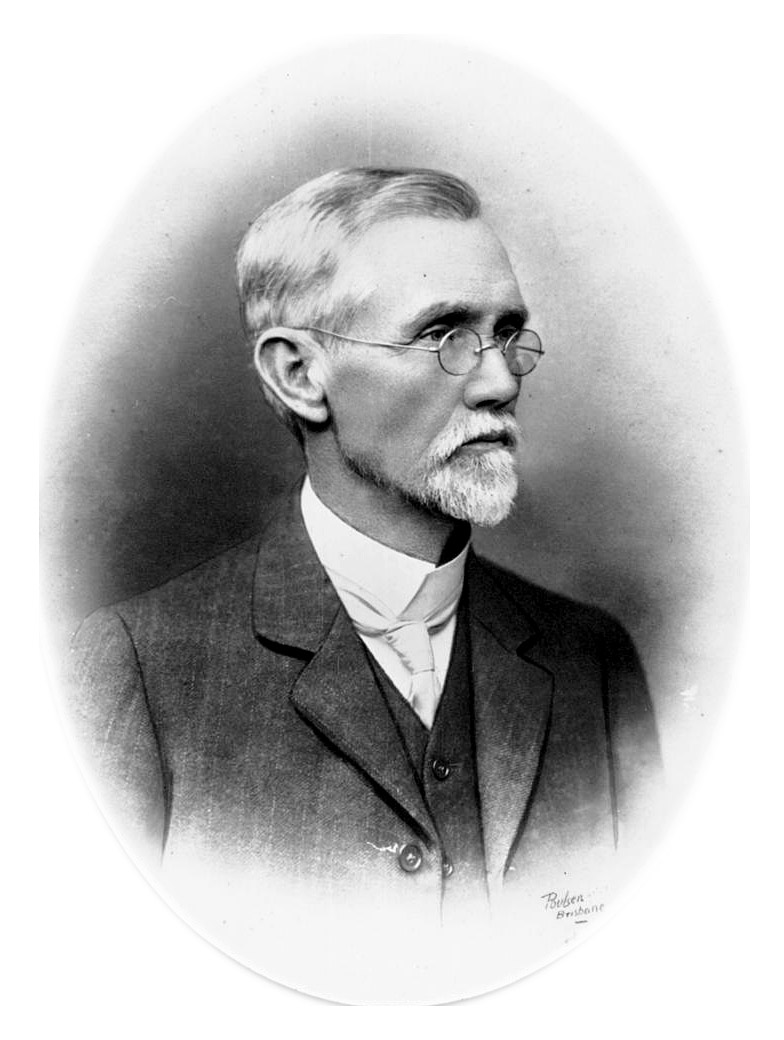
Robert Martin Collins (1843–1913)

This family owned timber church designed by Robin Dods, was erected by August 1915 and dedicated on 31 August 1915 by the Anglican Archbishop of Brisbane, St Clair Donaldson, in memory of Robert Martin Collins (1843–1913).

The first Tamrookum squatter was John Campbell and the lessee from 1848 was William Barker. In 1872 he paid £325 for portion 343 and was issued with a Deed of Grant for 1,000 acres (400 ha) which included the homestead (demolished in 1931) and church site.

Pastoralist John Collins of Mundoolun acquired the land in 1878 and in 1879 his eldest son Robert Martin Collins took up residence after his marriage to Arabella Smyth. RM Collins became the owner in 1886.

RM Collins and his brothers established vast pastoral interests in Queensland and the Northern Territory. He was a founding partner in the North Australian Pastoral Company and a pioneer of the frozen meat industry. He was a parliamentarian from 1896 to 1913 and was responsible for the establishment of Lamington National Park, proclaimed in 1915 after his death.

The site for the church and family graves overlooking Tamrookum homestead was selected by RM Collins just prior to his death. The church was built for RM Collins family at a cost of £2,098, by William Bywater of Brisbane. The sand, gravel and stone used to construct the 3-foot (0.91 m) foundation wall came from the property as did all the timber except for that employed for the pews and altar triptych.

This church includes many memorial gifts such as the triptych, carved altar rails, fonts and communion utensils. The stained glass windows were designed by English church architect, Sir Richard Lorimer, and made by Una Adamson.

The double entrance gates hewn by broadaxe, the flagpole and sundial all come from the homestead which was demolished when Arabella Collins died. The yards and some of Tamrookum's outbuildings remain.

Electricity probably replaced gas for illumination during the 1950s. The original split shingle roof was replaced by tiles in 1964. A plaque, the gift of the Queensland Women's Historical Association, giving a brief history of the church was unveiled in 1967.

The grounds include two burial areas. The oldest contains graves for station employees, family friends and locals. The other burial area is the family enclosure and RM Collins was the first to be buried here. The oldest monuments are Susan Goodwin's (1895) a servant, Grenville Arthur Kingsley (1898) son of novelist Charles Kingsley and friend of RM Collins and the grave of Constable George Doyle and Albert Dahlke, an employee, who were killed by the Kenniff brothers in 1902.

A section of the back row in the older area contains unmarked graves for non-Europeans including the 1913 grave of Salingo, a Kanaka, and the graves of William (1928) and Emily Williams (1927), local aborigines employed by the Collins family. A memorial stone (1991) that names the William's descendants is located outside the nearby Tamrookum Memorial Hall.

The timber chapels at Yandilla and Cressbrook Homestead and the stone St John the Evangelist Church at Mundoolun are the only remaining privately owned Anglican churches in Queensland. Both St Johns and All Saints are memorial churches and both Cressbrook and All Saints are Dods designs.

== Description ==
This single storeyed timber chapel, located on a hill with views to the surrounding countryside, is situated in well maintained grounds containing mature trees, flower gardens and a cemetery. The entry to the site is through a heavy timber gateway hung with double timber entry gates.

The building, a traditional Latin cross plan, has a hardwood frame set on a concrete base and is clad in oiled hardwood weatherboards. The construction is characterised by the use of massive timber structural elements and delicate detailing. The steep concrete tiled gable roof consists of a main roof over the nave and chancel and smaller gables over the transepts and the two entry porches.

These entry porches are located at the western end of the northern and southern elevations and are linked to the transept by narrow verandahs. Two additional entries, accessed via the verandah, open into the transepts. Verandah posts and balustrades are simple sturdy timbers adorned by an undulating timber beam. The beam is positioned below the top plate and supported on splayed brackets attached to the verandah posts. Decorative timberwork on the verandahs and the gable ends is painted white providing a strong contrast to the dark walls and the plain form of the roof.

At the western end, the roof, extended to cover the verandah, dominates the low walls. An effect that is emphasised by the low head height of timber casement windows on the north, south and west elevations. On the eastern end the roof steps back, stained glass windows are placed high in the eastern facade and the wall appears tall relative to the roof.

At the entry porches steps that are cut into the concrete base lead to double timber doors opening onto the north and south sides of the entry vestibule. This vestibule, an extension of the nave, is separated from it by an ornamental timber screen. Decorative timber screens also define the entries from the transept into the nave. The interior of the church, furnished with the original timber pews, is lined with unpainted cedar and has a coloured concrete floor. The raked timber lined ceiling, truncated at the peak, is supported on timber trusses that are a combination of a queen and king post system. The bottom chord of the trusses is a heavy tie beam supported on timber wall brackets.

The interior is dimly lit through domestic-scaled casement windows with diamond patterned glazing bars and green glass. The only natural light that falls from above, illuminating the ceiling space, is through the stained glass windows behind the altar. The altar and altar screen positioned against the rear wall of the chancel are on a raised floor behind an ornamental timber rail. Rooms in the transepts contain disused rainwater tanks.

North of the building is a rectangular fenced area that contains the tombstones of the Collins family. The most prominent of these, a centrally located cross on a pedestal, is that of RM Collins and his immediate family. The fence is wire mesh on a pipe frame sitting on a concrete upstand with gates located under arched trellises. The burial area of locals and friends of the family consists of 4 rows of graves situated in the lawn adjacent to the western boundary of the grounds. Monuments are in good condition.

The grounds are bounded by a timber post and rail fence. A caretaker's cottage and outbuildings are located to the east, just outside the fence. The building and grounds are in excellent condition.

== Heritage listing ==
All Saints Memorial Church was listed on the Queensland Heritage Register on 21 October 1992 having satisfied the following criteria.

The place is important in demonstrating the evolution or pattern of Queensland's history.

The commemorative structures in both the church and cemetery add to the significance of All Saints Memorial Church.

The place demonstrates rare, uncommon or endangered aspects of Queensland's cultural heritage.

All Saints Memorial Church is significant due to the landmark quality of the gardens and the siting of the chapel and is a rare example of a privately owned chapel.

The place is important in demonstrating the principal characteristics of a particular class of cultural places.

All Saints Memorial Church is an important work of significant Australian architect RS Dods, demonstrating his skill at designing in timber and his personal style.

The place is important because of its aesthetic significance.

The accomplished design, the high quality of the materials and workmanship and inventive detailing combine to produce a unique aesthetic achievement. All Saints Memorial Church is significant due to the landmark quality of the gardens and the siting of the chapel and is a rare example of a privately owned chapel. The quality of the stained glass work and association with R Lorimer and U Adamson contribute to the significance of the All Saints Memorial Church.

The place is important in demonstrating a high degree of creative or technical achievement at a particular period.

The accomplished design, the high quality of the materials and workmanship and inventive detailing combine to produce a unique aesthetic achievement.

The place has a special association with the life or work of a particular person, group or organisation of importance in Queensland's history.

All Saints Memorial Church is significant due to its close association with the Collins family and RM Collins.
