= Thomas Plunkett, senior =

Australian politician

Thomas Plunkett
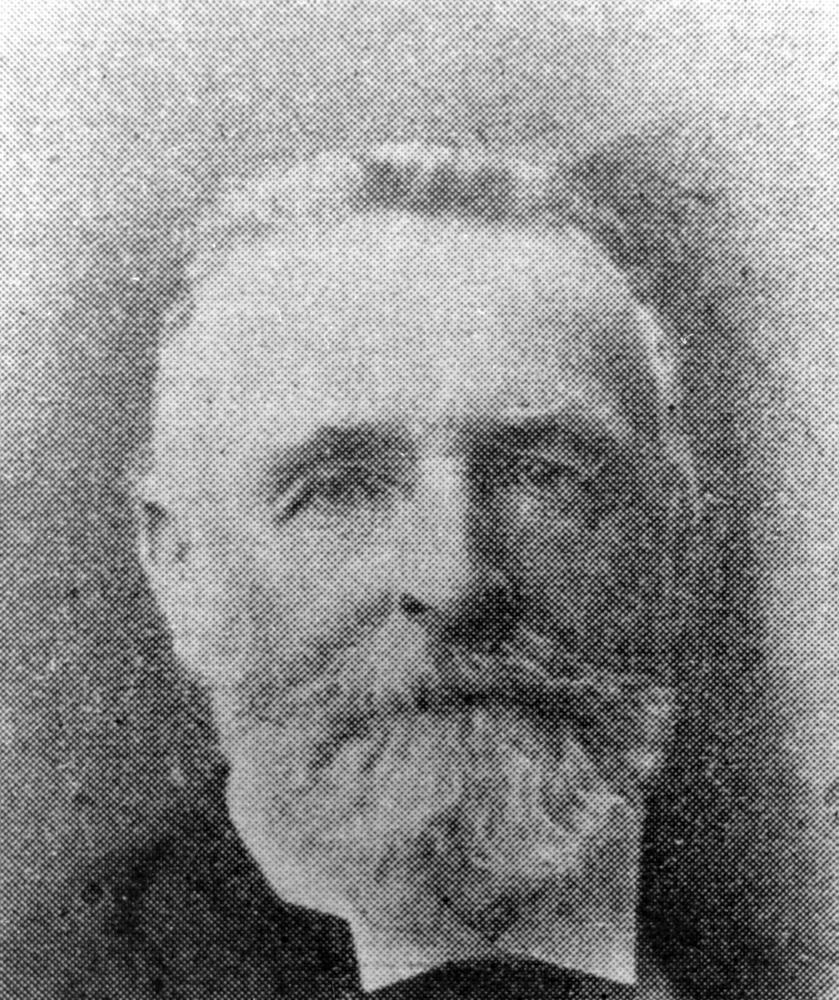

Member of the Queensland Legislative Assembly for Albert
- In office 17 May 1888 – 21 March 1896
- Preceded by: New seat
- Succeeded by: Robert Collins
- In office 18 March 1899 – 5 February 1908
- Preceded by: Robert Collins
- Succeeded by: John Appel

Personal details
- Born: Thomas Plunkett; April 1840 Arrigal, County Meath, Ireland
- Died: 2 September 1913 (aged 73) Sandgate, Queensland, Australia
- Resting place: Tambourine (Tamborine) Catholic Cemetery
- Party: Opposition
- Other political affiliations: Ministerial
- Spouse: Maria Ryan (m.1866 d.1939)
- Relations: Thomas Flood Plunkett (son)
- Occupation: Farmer

Thomas Plunkett (April 1840 – 2 September 1913) was a farmer and Member of the Queensland Legislative Assembly in Queensland, Australia.

== Biography ==
Plunkett was born in Arrigal, County Meath, the son of John Plunkett and his wife Catherine (née Flood). He was educated privately and at the local school before sailing to Queensland aboard the Fiery Star in 1863. In 1866 he selected farmland which he named "Waterford" at Logan. In 1870 he then acquired land at on north bank of the Albert River at Tamborine (around Plunkett Road today) which he named Villa Maria in honour of his wife. He also purchased 2000 acres at Kerry and also land at Logan Village where he took up dairy farming and crop growing. Later on he established a general store in the Tamborine area around 1872 and became the postmaster in 1874.

On 2 May 1866 Plunkett married Maria Ryan (died 1939) at St Stephen's Cathedral in Brisbane and together had four sons and four daughters. In September 1913 he died at the residence of one of his daughters at Sandgate and his body was taken to South Brisbane railway station to be transported to Logan Village railway station after which he was buried in the Tamborine Catholic Cemetery (which was on land on Plunkett Road which he had donated to the church for a cemetery).

== Public career ==
Plunkett won the new seat of Albert at the 1888 Queensland colonial election, but was defeated by Robert Collins in 1896. He regained the seat three years later and held it until he retired from politics in 1908.

Plunkett was a member of the Colonists' Anti-Convention Bill League and campaigned vigorously against the federation of the Australian colonies. In 1902, after Queensland had joined the federation, he unsuccessfully moved a pro-secession motion in the Legislative Assembly. He moved similar motions in each year between 1905 and 1907.

Plunkett's son, Thomas Flood Plunkett, was a long serving member of the Queensland Parliament having represented the seats of Albert and Darlington.

Parliament of Queensland
| New seat | Member for Albert; 1888–1896 | Succeeded by Robert Collins |
| Preceded by Robert Collins | Member for Albert; 1899–1908 | Succeeded by John Appel |
