= Bill Baumann =

Australian politician

Member of the Queensland Legislative Assembly for Albert
- In office 15 July 1995 – 17 February 2001
- Preceded by: John Szczerbanik
- Succeeded by: Margaret Keech

Personal details
- Born: William Francis Baumann; 12 October 1942 (age 83) Southport, Queensland, Australia
- Party: National Party
- Occupation: Company chairman

William Francis Baumann (born 12 October 1942) is a former Australian politician. He was the National Party member for Albert in the Legislative Assembly of Queensland from 1995 to 2001.

Born in Southport, Baumann was chairman of Coachtrans Australia, the largest coach company on the Gold Coast with a fleet of 150 vehicles at the time of its sale to Sita Buslines.

In 1995 Baumann defeated John Szczerbanik to win the seat of Albert for the National Party. Following Labor's formation of government 1998, he became Opposition Whip. He did not recontest Albert at the 2001 election choosing instead to contest the new seat of Gaven but was defeated by Labor candidate Robert Poole.

Parliament of Queensland
Preceded by John Szczerbanik	Member for Albert; 1995–2001	Succeeded by Margaret Keech
