= Ivan Gibbs =

Australian politician

The Honourable Ivan Gibbs

Member of the Queensland Legislative Assembly for Albert
- In office 7 December 1974 – 2 December 1989
- Preceded by: Bill D'Arcy
- Succeeded by: John Szczerbanik

Personal details
- Born: Ivan James Gibbs; 22 November 1927 Whittlesea, Victoria, Australia
- Died: 19 May 2011 (aged 83) Benowa, Gold Coast, Queensland, Australia
- Party: National Party
- Spouse: Doris Weir (m.1950)
- Occupation: Managing director

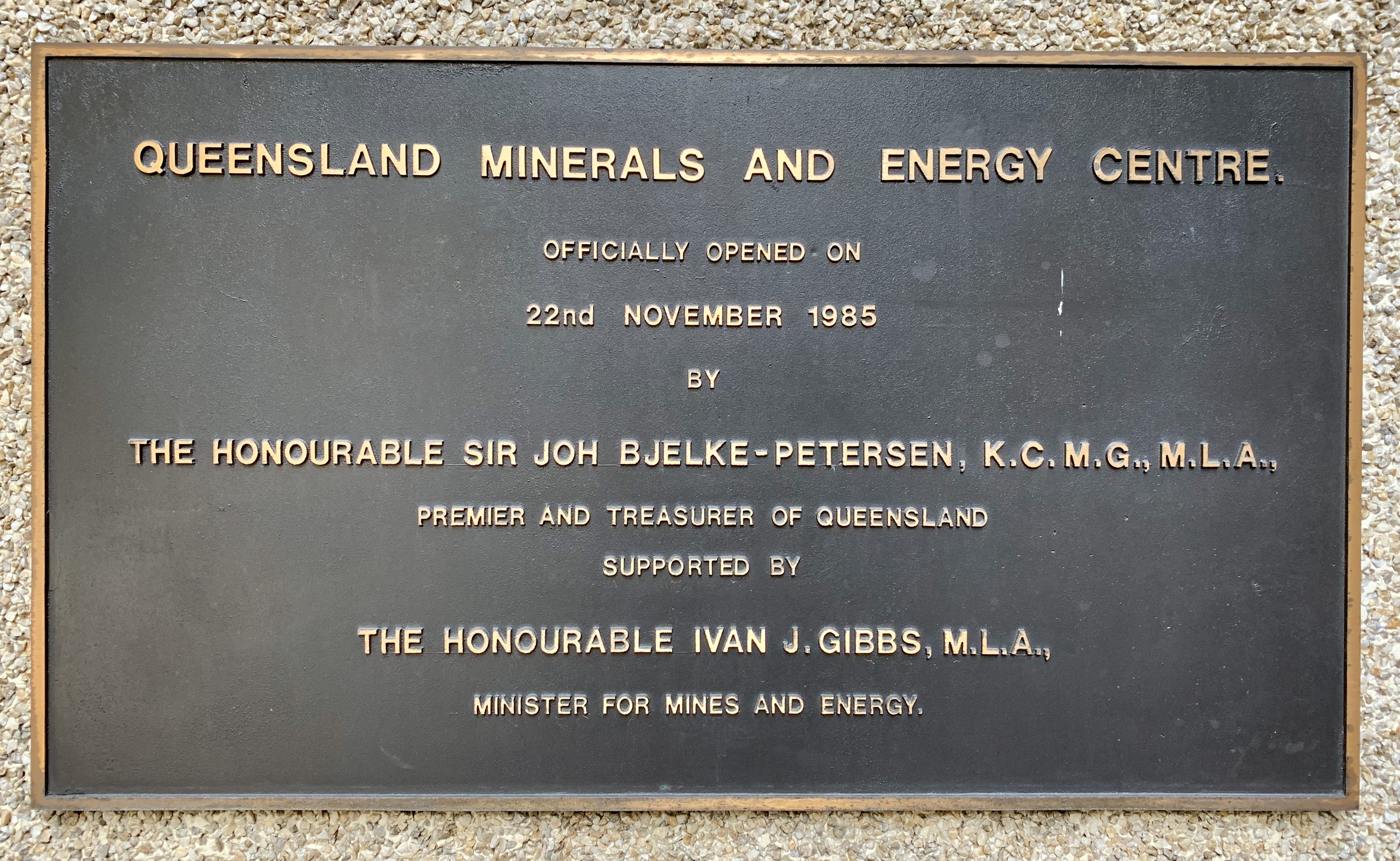
Opening plaque at 61 Mary Street, Brisbane for the Queensland Minerals and Energy Centre

Ivan James Gibbs (22 November 1927 – 19 May 2011) was an Australian politician.

== Politics ==
Gibbs was a member of the Legislative Assembly of Queensland, representing the seat of electoral district of Albert for the National Party from 1974 to 1989. He held the Health portfolio in the last days of the Bjelke-Petersen government. He was also Attorney-General.

Parliament of Queensland
| Preceded by Bill D'Arcy | Member for Albert; 1974–1989 | Succeeded by John Szczerbanik |
Political offices
| Preceded by Tom Newbery | Minister for Culture, National Parks and Recreation; 1979–1980 | Succeeded by Tony Fitzgerald |
| Preceded by Vic Sullivan | Minister for Mines and Energy; 1980–1986 | Succeeded by Brian Austin |
| Preceded by Claude Wharton | Minister for Works and Housing; 1986–1987 | Succeeded by Bill Gunn |
| Preceded by Mike Ahern | Minister for Transport; 1987–1989 | Succeeded by Peter McKechnie |
| Preceded by Leisha Harvey | Minister for Health; 1989 | Succeeded by Ken McElligott |
| Preceded by Paul Clauson | Attorney-General of Queensland; 1989 | Succeeded by Tony Fitzgerald |
