= Desley Scott =

Australian politician

Shadow Minister for Community Services, Child Safety, Mental Health, Women, Seniors and Multicultural Affairs
- In office 19 April 2012 – 14 February 2015
- Leader: Annastacia Palaszczuk
- Preceded by: Tracy Davis (Child Safety and Mental Health); Fiona Simpson (Community Services and Women); Scott Emerson (Multicultural Affairs)
- Succeeded by: Tracy Davis (Child Safety and Communities)

Shadow Minister for Disability Services
- In office 19 April 2012 – 4 March 2014
- Leader: Annastacia Palaszczuk
- Preceded by: Tracy Davis
- Succeeded by: Yvette D'Ath

Member of the Queensland Parliament for Woodridge
- In office 17 February 2001 – 31 January 2015
- Preceded by: Mike Kaiser
- Succeeded by: Cameron Dick

Personal details
- Born: 27 June 1943 (age 82) Toowoomba
- Party: Labor

Desley Carleton Scott (born 27 June 1943 in Toowoomba) is an Australian retired Labor Party politician who was the member for Woodridge in the Parliament of Queensland from 2001 to 2015.

Scott was elected to parliament at the 2001 state election, after working as an electoral officer for 16 years. She holds a dental nurse certificate.

Due to the tiny size of the ALP caucus since the party's defeat at the 2012 election, she was a member of the shadow cabinet but did not become a minister as she retired at the 2015 election.

At the 2012 election, Scott retained her seat with a significant margin for a Labor MP of 5.8%, after a 19.57% swing against her party. According to Independent MP Alex Douglas, "She was completely focussed on the needs of Woodridge residents, which in turn earned her the respect of her constituents.", which led to her being one of only seven Queensland ALP MPs being elected at the 2012 election.

== Opposition Period 2012–2015 ==
Under Queensland ALP Leader Annastacia Palaszczuk, Scott was given the Shadow Portfolios of Disabilities, Communities, Child Safety, Mental Health, Women and Multicultural Affairs. She was also the Deputy Opposition Whip.

Parliament of Queensland
Preceded by Mike Kaiser	Member for Woodridge; 2001–2015	Succeeded by Cameron Dick
