= Robert Martin Collins =

Australian politician

The Hon Robert Collins
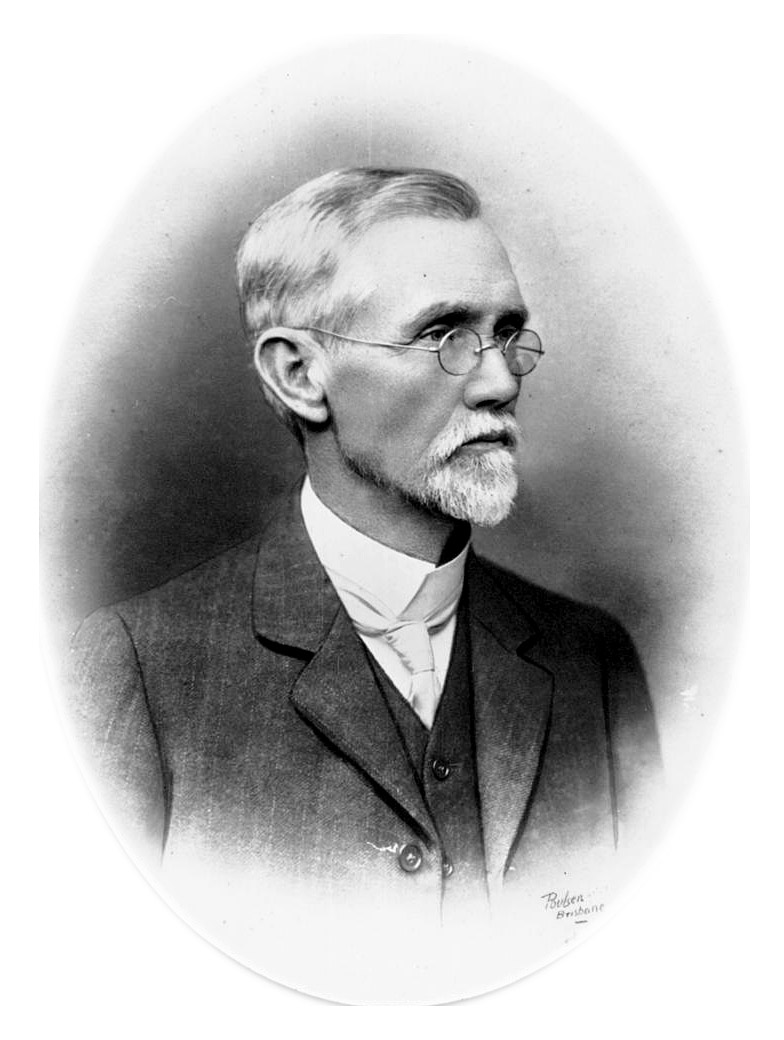

Member of the Queensland Legislative Assembly for Albert
- In office 21 March 1896 – 18 March 1899
- Preceded by: Thomas Plunkett Sr.
- Succeeded by: Thomas Plunkett Sr.

Member of the Queensland Legislative Council
- In office 14 June 1913 – 18 August 1913

Personal details
- Born: Robert Martin Collins; 17 December 1843 Sydney, New South Wales, Australia
- Died: 18 August 1913 (aged 69) Tamrookum Station, Queensland, Australia
- Resting place: Tamrookum Anglican Cemetery
- Party: Ministerial
- Spouse: Arabella Clotilda Boles Smyth (b.1857 m.1879 d.1931)
- Occupation: Explorer, Grazier

Robert Martin Collins (17 December 1843 – 18 August 1913) was an Australian explorer, grazier, member of both the Queensland Legislative Council and the Queensland Legislative Assembly.

== Early life ==
Collins was born in December 1843 at Sydney, New South Wales, to John Collins and his wife Anne (née Martin). A year after he was born, his family moved to the Logan district of Queensland to take shares in Mundoolun, a property that a friend of his father had taken up. Collins was educated at St John's School in Brisbane and later boarded at Calder House School, Sydney.

In 1863, Collins joined his father and brother, William to form John Collins & Sons and for the next ten years he divided his time between Mundoolun and Westgrove, another property his father had purchased in 1863. In 1873, and hearing accounts of the country out west, he set out to inspect it for himself, the trip taking three months and taking him as far as Diamantina. This was but the first of many expeditions he made out west, making him known as an authority on Western Queensland.

In 1877, his family, along with Thomas McIlwraith, William Forrest, and Englishman, Sir William Ingram joined to form the North Australian Pastoral Company. The company owned large tracts of land in both Queensland and South Australia as well as Alexandria Station in the Northern Territory and Collins and his brother made regular trips to inspect and purchase land.

== Political career ==
Collins turned to politics and in 1896, standing as an independent in the seat of Albert, he defeated the sitting member, Thomas Plunkett Sr. by a narrow margin. He served the electorate for three years before Plunkett regained the seat at the 1899 election.

In June 1913, Premier Digby Denham appointed Collins to the Legislative Council but he served only two months before his death in August of that year.

While in America, Collins heard stories of Yellowstone National Park and for many years kept closely with that park's progress. From the 1880s onwards, he fought for the preservation of the McPherson Range, and was a founder of the Queensland system of National Parks, convincing the state government to bring in to legislation laws to protect them.

== Personal life ==
In 1879, Collins married Arabella Clotilda Smyth in Ireland and together had seven children. His sister, Anna Bertha Collins, was the wife of Sir Simon Fraser and the grandmother of Prime Minister Malcolm Fraser. As well as his pastoral interests, Collins was a director of the Bank of North Queensland and the Queensland Meat Export Co. and in 1896 was president of the Queensland Royal Geographical Society.

Collins died at Tamrookum and was buried in the Tamrookum Anglican Cemetery. A sign of his importance and the respect he held with the public was that a special train was engaged to take the hundreds of mourners from Brisbane to his funeral, returning home late that evening.

Parliament of Queensland
Preceded by Thomas Plunkett Sr.	Member for Albert; 1896–1899	Succeeded by Thomas Plunkett Sr.
