= John Szczerbanik =

Australian politician

Member of the Queensland Legislative Assembly for Albert
- In office 2 December 1989 – 15 July 1995
- Preceded by: Ivan Gibbs
- Succeeded by: Bill Baumann

Personal details
- Born: John Szczerbanik; 20 March 1957 (age 69) Liverpool, New South Wales, Australia
- Party: Labor
- Occupation: Registered nurse

John Szczerbanik (born 20 March 1957) is a former Australian politician.

He was born in Liverpool, Sydney, and worked as a registered nurse before entering politics. He was elected to the Queensland Legislative Assembly in 1989 as the Labor member for Albert, and he served as a backbencher until his defeat by National Party candidate Bill Baumann in 1995.

Parliament of Queensland
| Preceded by Ivan Gibbs | Member for Albert; 1989–1995 | Succeeded by Bill Baumann |
