= Electoral district of Macalister =

State electoral district of Queensland, Australia

Macalister Queensland—Legislative Assembly
- Map of Macalister, 2017
- State: Queensland
- Dates current: 2017–present
- MP: Melissa McMahon
- Party: Labor Party
- Namesake: Arthur Macalister
- Electors: 36,912 (2020)
- Area: 91 km^{2} (35.1 sq mi)
- Demographic: Outer-metropolitan
- Coordinates: 27.7034°S 153.2150°E
Electorates around Macalister:
Springwood	Springwood	Redlands
Waterford	Macalister	Redlands
Logan	Coomera	Coomera

Macalister is an electoral district of the Legislative Assembly in the Australian state of Queensland. It was created in the 2017 redistribution, and was first contested at the 2017 Queensland state election. It is named after the second Queensland Premier, Arthur Macalister.

Located in Logan City, Macalister consists of the suburbs of Bahrs Scrub, Bannockburn, Beenleigh, Carbrook, Cornubia, Eagleby, Edens Landing, Holmview, Mount Warren Park, Windaroo and parts of the suburbs of Loganholme and Waterford.

It takes in areas from the previous districts of Albert, Coomera, Redlands, Springwood and Waterford.

Based on the results from the 2015 Queensland state election, Macalister was estimated to be a fairly safe seat for the Labor Party with a margin of 6.4% in the leadup to the 2017 Queensland state election.

== Members for Macalister ==
Member	Party	Term
Melissa McMahon	Labor	2017–present

== Election results ==
2024 Queensland state election: Macalister
Party	Candidate	Votes	%	±%
Labor	Melissa McMahon	13,631	40.82	−3.36
Liberal National	Rob van Manen	12,041	36.06	+8.92
Greens	Liam Johns	2,369	7.09	+0.89
One Nation	Cheree Cooper	2,327	6.97	−0.49
Legalise Cannabis	Meredith Brisk	1,568	4.70	+4.70
Family First	Paul Davis	1,457	4.36	+4.36
Total formal votes		33,393	94.63	+0.03
Informal votes		1,895	5.37	−0.03
Turnout		35,288	84.19	+0.59
Two-party-preferred result
Labor	Melissa McMahon	17,342	51.93	−7.61
Liberal National	Rob van Manen	16,051	48.07	+7.61
Labor hold		Swing	−7.61	

== See also ==
- Electoral districts of Queensland
- Members of the Queensland Legislative Assembly by year
- Category:Members of the Queensland Legislative Assembly by name
