= Electoral district of Woodridge =

State electoral district of Queensland, Australia

Woodridge Queensland—Legislative Assembly
- Electoral map of Woodridge, 2017
- State: Queensland
- Dates current: 1977–present
- MP: Cameron Dick
- Party: Labor
- Namesake: Woodridge
- Electors: 36,787 (2020)
- Area: 39 km^{2} (15.1 sq mi)
- Demographic: Outer-metropolitan
- Coordinates: 27°39′S 153°6′E
Electorates around Woodridge:
Stretton	Stretton	Waterford
Algester	Woodridge	Waterford
Logan	Logan	Waterford

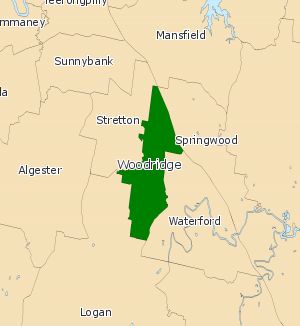
Electoral map of Woodridge, 2008

Woodridge is an electoral district of the Legislative Assembly in the Australian state of Queensland.

The district is based in the southern suburbs of Brisbane. It is named for the suburb of Woodridge and also takes in the suburbs of Crestmead, Kingston, Logan Central, Marsden and Slacks Creek. The electorate was first created for the 1977 election.

Woodridge has been held by the Labor Party for all but a few months of its existence, when Mike Kaiser briefly served as an independent after being forced to resign from the party for branch-stacking a decade earlier. Since the 1980s, it has usually been one of Labor's safest seats. The only time Labor came close to losing the seat at an election came during Labor's near-wipeout in 2012, in which incumbent Desley Scott saw her majority slashed from a comfortably safe 25.4 percent to a marginal 5.8 percent. Scott retired ahead of the 2015 election. Her replacement, former cabinet minister Cameron Dick, reverted the seat to its usual status as a comfortably safe Labor seat, ballooning the Labor majority to 25.9 percent—the safest seat in the entire legislature.

== Members for Woodridge ==
Member	Party	Term
Bill D'Arcy	Labor	1977–2000
Mike Kaiser	Labor	2000–2001
Mike Kaiser	Independent	2001–2001
Desley Scott	Labor	2001–2015
Cameron Dick	Labor	2015–present

== Election results ==
2024 Queensland state election: Woodridge
Party	Candidate	Votes	%	±%
Labor	Cameron Dick	16,093	53.6	−13.4
Liberal National	Paul Darwen	6,315	21.0	+6.0
Greens	Muhammed Ansary	3,940	13.1	+5.8
One Nation	Zoran Kazovic	2,233	7.5	−3.2
Family First	Karilyn Larsen	1,434	4.8	+4.8
Total formal votes		30,015	93.4	
Informal votes		2,137	6.6	
Turnout		32,152		
Two-party-preferred result
Labor	Cameron Dick	20,510	68.3	−7.9
Liberal National	Paul Darwen	9,505	31.7	+7.9
Labor hold		Swing	-7.9	
