= Mike Kaiser =

Australian politician

Member of the Queensland Legislative Assembly for Woodridge
- In office 5 February 2000 – 17 February 2001
- Preceded by: Bill D'Arcy
- Succeeded by: Desley Scott

Personal details
- Born: Michael Hans Kaiser; 20 April 1963 (age 63) Brisbane, Queensland, Australia
- Party: Labor
- Education: University of Queensland

Michael Hans Kaiser (born 20 April 1963 in Brisbane) is an Australian public servant and former politician.

Kaiser graduated from the University of Queensland with degrees in electrical engineering and economics. He was active in Australian Labor Party (ALP) politics from a young age and was State Secretary of the Queensland branch of the Labor Party from 1993 to 2000. He left his position as State Secretary when he was elected to the Legislative Assembly of Queensland in a by-election for the electorate of Woodridge in 2000.

Kaiser's career in parliament was brief. He resigned firstly from the Labor Party and secondly as an MP in 2001 after admitting to the Shepherdson Inquiry into electoral fraud that he had been fraudulently enrolled in 1986 as part of a Labor Party branch stacking exercise.

Kaiser conducted his own consultancy for a couple of years until he was appointed by the Labor Party in 2003 to serve as its Assistant National Secretary in the lead up to and during the 2004 federal election.

Kaiser was subsequently employed as chief of staff to New South Wales Premier Morris Iemma before becoming chief of staff to Queensland Premier Anna Bligh in late 2007.

In December 2009, Kaiser commenced employment with NBN Co, the company established by the Rudd Labor government to design, build and operate a National Broadband Network, as its Corporate Affairs Executive. In September 2011 he became NBN Co's Head of Quality, responsible for customer/consumer satisfaction, process improvement, data quality and response management.

From January 2021 until April 2022, Kaiser was appointed as Director-General of the Queensland Department of Resources. He was Director-General of the Department of State Development, Infrastructure, Local Government and Planning from April 2022 until December 2023. On 21 December 2023, Kaiser was appointed as Director-General of the Department of the Premier and Cabinet (Queensland). On 27 October 2024, he was stood down by Premier-elect David Crisafulli following the 2024 Queensland state election.

In July 2025 Kaiser was appointed as the Secretary of the federal Department of Climate Change, Energy, the Environment and Water by Anthony Albanese.

Parliament of Queensland
Preceded by Bill D'Arcy	Member for Woodridge; 2000–2001	Succeeded by Desley Scott
