= Mark Boothman =

Australian politician

Mark Boothman MP

Member of the Queensland Legislative Assembly for Albert
- In office 24 March 2012 – 25 November 2017
- Preceded by: Margaret Keech
- Succeeded by: Seat abolished

Member of the Queensland Legislative Assembly for Theodore
- Incumbent
- Assumed office 25 November 2017
- Preceded by: New seat

Personal details
- Born: 6 June 1977 (age 49)
- Party: Liberal National Party of Queensland
- Profession: Mortgage broker

Mark Andrew Boothman (born 6 June 1977) is an Australian Liberal National politician who has served as Member of Parliament for Theodore in the Legislative Assembly of Queensland since 2017. He previously served for Albert after defeating government whip Margaret Keech to win at the 2012 state election. Albert was removed in the 2017 electoral redistribution, with its southern part transferred into the new electorate of Theodore.

Parliament of Queensland
Preceded by Margaret Keech	Member for Albert; 2012–2017	Abolished
New seat	Member for Theodore; 2017–present	Incumbent
