= Electoral district of Albert =

Electoral district of Queensland, Australia

Albert Queensland—Legislative Assembly
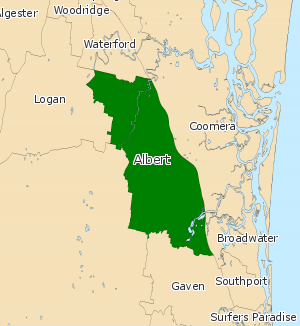
- State: Queensland
- Dates current: 1888–1950, 1960–2017
- Namesake: Albert River
- Electors: 36,716 (2015)
- Area: 235 km^{2} (90.7 sq mi)
- Coordinates: 27°49′S 153°13′E

Albert was a Legislative Assembly electorate in the state of Queensland which existed from 1887 to 1949 and 1959 to 2017.

Albert was named for the Albert River, which runs through the electorate and separates Logan City from City of Gold Coast. It was first created in a redistribution in 1887 ahead of the 1888 colonial election and continued to exist (with various boundary alterations) until 1949, when the Darlington and Southport electorates were created. In 1959, the electorate was established again. The 1971 and 1977 redistributions greatly reduced the area of the electorate and minor changes were made in 1991, including the loss of Carbrook in the north and coastal areas below Paradise Point in the south.

Its consistently changing boundaries together with its existence in a high-growth area do not provide consistent political leanings over time, although it showed more inclination towards the Labor Party over time than any other Gold Coast seat.

The last Member for Albert, Mark Boothman, was first elected in the 2012 election.

Albert was removed in the 2017 electoral redistribution, its northern part being transferred into Logan and Macalister, its centre part transferred into Coomera, and its southern part transferred into the new electorate of Theodore.

== History ==
Historically, the Gold Coast and Logan regions were sparsely populated agricultural areas, and the Albert electorate covered the entire south-eastern corner of the state. Its representation broadly reflected the conservative leanings and rural interests of its population, and John Appel, who served in both the Second Kidston Ministry and Denham Ministry, participated in the formation of both the Queensland Farmers' Union from the rural caucus of the Liberal Party in 1915 and the subsequent Country Party in 1919.

The seat's boundaries evolved thus:

- Prior to 1920, the seat covered the entire modern City of Gold Coast plus Beaudesert and Jimboomba.
- At the 1920 election, it lost Beaudesert and Jimboomba to the neighbouring seat of Fassifern, and moved north to cover all of what is now Logan City.
- At the 1932 election, it lost the Logan area, and regained Jimboomba.
- At the 1935 election, it lost Jimboomba, and gained all of what is now Redland City, including North Stradbroke Island, from the seat of Wynnum.

It was split up in the 1949 redistribution ahead of the 1950 state election into Darlington, which included Redland, Logan, Beaudesert, Coomera, Jimboomba and Tamborine; and Southport which was limited to the Gold Coast and its hinterland. Both seats remained safe for the Country Party; Plunkett opted to contest the seat of Darlington.

At the 1960 state election, the fast-growing Southport seat was split into Albert in the north and South Coast in the south. Further urban growth pushed the seat progressively northwards.

Its boundaries, as at the 2009 election, took in mostly urban, semi-urban and industrial areas west of the Pacific Motorway extending from Mount Warren Park and Windaroo in southern Logan to Coomera and Oxenford in the outer northern Gold Coast.

== Members for Albert ==
First incarnation (1888–1950)
Member	Party	Term
Thomas Plunkett Sr.	Conservative	1888–1890
Thomas Plunkett Sr.	Ministerialist	1890–1896
Robert Collins	Independent	1896–1899
Thomas Plunkett Sr.	Opposition	1899–1903
Thomas Plunkett Sr.	Liberal	1903–1907
Thomas Plunkett Sr.	Kidstonites	1907–1908
John Appel	Conservative	1908–1909
John Appel	Liberal	1909–1915
John Appel	Farmers' Union	1915–1917
John Appel	National	1917–1919
John Appel	Country	1919–1922
John Appel	United	1922–1925
John Appel	CPNP	1925–1929
Thomas Flood Plunkett	CPNP	1929–1936
Thomas Flood Plunkett	Country	1936–1950
Second incarnation (1960–2017)
Member	Party	Term
Cec Carey	Country	1960–1969
Bill Heatley	Liberal	1970–1971
Bill D'Arcy	Labor	1972–1974
Ivan Gibbs	National	1974–1989
John Szczerbanik	Labor	1989–1995
Bill Baumann	National	1995–2001
Margaret Keech	Labor	2001–2012
Mark Boothman	Liberal National	2012–2017
