= Bill D'Arcy =

Australian politician and convicted sex offender

Member of the Queensland Legislative Assembly for Albert
- In office 27 May 1972 – 7 December 1974
- Preceded by: Bill Heatley
- Succeeded by: Ivan Gibbs

Member of the Queensland Legislative Assembly for Woodridge
- In office 12 November 1977 – 9 January 2000
- Preceded by: New seat
- Succeeded by: Mike Kaiser

Personal details
- Born: William Theodore D'Arcy; 31 July 1939 (age 87) Brisbane, Queensland, Australia
- Party: Labor
- Occupation: Teacher, business consultant

William Theodore D'Arcy (born 31 July 1939) is a former Australian politician. He was the Labor member for Albert (1972–74) and Woodridge (1977–2000) in the Legislative Assembly of Queensland.

D'Arcy was born in Brisbane. He worked as a teacher and business consultant before his entry into politics.

He was first elected to parliament at the 1972 election for the seat of Albert following Liberal MLA Bill Heatley's death, but he was defeated at the 1974 election. He returned to the Assembly in 1977 as the member for the new seat of Woodridge. In 1987 he was appointed Opposition Spokesman on Tourism, Sport and Racing, and in February 1980 became Deputy Leader of the Opposition, serving until 1982. He held his seat until his resignation in January 2000.

Later in 2000, D’Arcy was convicted of a number of sexual offences against children from his days as a teacher at country primary schools in the 1960s and 1970s. He was imprisoned until released in 2007.

On 13 November 2011, an article appeared in The Australian newspaper reporting D'Arcy as strongly protesting his innocence of all charges and claiming that "private investigators, psychologists and lawyers" had built a case that would prove his innocence. In reply Queensland Attorney-General Paul Lucas dismissed his claims, saying "I have nothing but contempt for Bill D'Arcy."

Parliament of Queensland
| Preceded by Bill Heatley | Member for Albert; 1972–1974 | Succeeded by Ivan Gibbs |
| Preceded by New seat | Member for Woodridge; 1977–2000 | Succeeded by Mike Kaiser |
