= Mount Lindesay Highway =

Highway in Queensland

Mount Lindesay Highway Beaudesert Road Queensland
- Mount Lindesay Highway (green and black)

General information
- Type: Highway
- Length: 116 km (72 mi)
- Route number(s): National Route 13 (1955–present)

Major junctions
- North end: Ipswich Road (A7); Moorooka, Brisbane
- Granard / Riawena Roads (Metroad 2); Learoyd Road (State Route 30); Compton Road (State Route 30); Logan Motorway (M2); Browns Plains Road (State Route 94); Stockleigh Road (State Route 88); Beaudesert–Nerang Road (State Route 90); Beaudesert–Boonah Road (State Route 90)
- South end: Summerland Way (B91); QLD/NSW border

Location(s)
- Major settlements: Jimboomba, Beaudesert, Rathdowney

Highway system
- Highways in Australia; National Highway • Freeways in Australia; Highways in Queensland

Mount Lindesay Highway is an Australian national highway located in Queensland. The highway runs southwest from Brisbane, where it leaves Ipswich Road in the suburb of Moorooka (as Beaudesert Road to the Logan Motorway), to the Queensland – New South Wales border and is 116 kilometres (72 mi) in length. For most of its length it is roughly aligned with the Sydney–Brisbane rail corridor. At its southern end these transport routes take different passes over the Scenic Rim into the Northern Rivers region. It is designated National Route 13.

== State-controlled road ==
Mount Lindesay Highway is a state-controlled road, subdivided into two sections for administrative and funding purposes. Section 25A is a regional road, while section 25B is part regional and part district. The sections are:

- 25A – Drewvale to Beaudesert
- 25B – Beaudesert to Mount Lindesay

== Route ==
Mount Lindesay Highway commences at the intersection with Ipswich Road in Moorooka and heads in a southerly direction sign-posted as Beaudesert Road, through Brisbane's southern suburban fringes, where it then crosses Logan Motorway. It continues south sign-posted as Mount Lindesay Highway through Jimboomba and Beaudesert, and onwards through the Scenic Rim region through Rathdowney, where the northern end of Lions Road tourist drive begins. South of Rathdowney the highway becomes very winding as it climbs the McPherson Range passing Mount Chinghee National Park, Mount Barney National Park and Border Ranges National Park on the way. The highway officially ends at the state border with New South Wales, where it continues south eventually to Casino and Grafton as Summerland Way.

== History ==
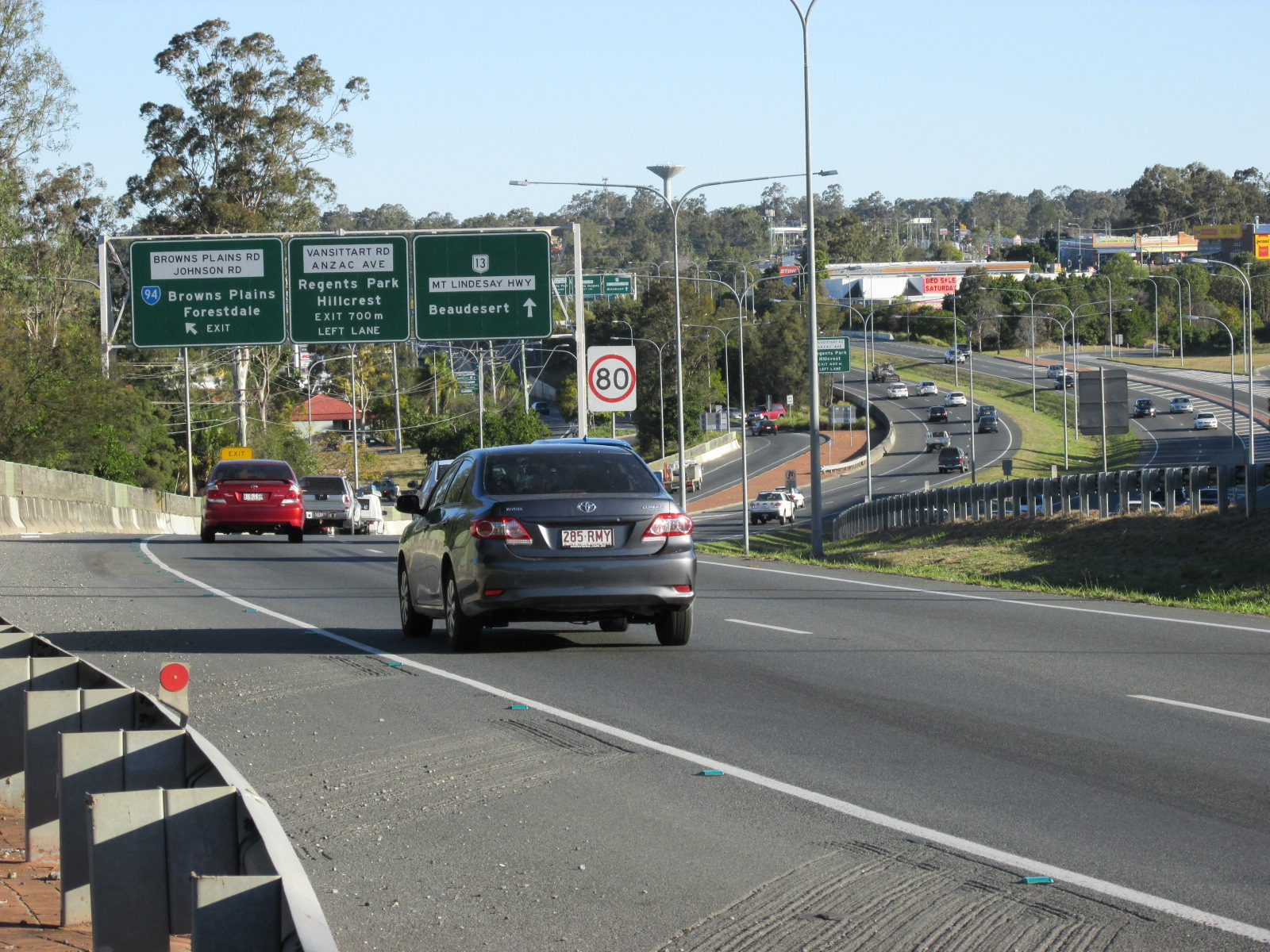
Browns Plains, 2014

Until the 1950s, the highway formed part of the main traffic route between Brisbane and Sydney. The coastal route (now the Pacific Highway) was not favoured due to the large number of ferry crossings of the wide coastal rivers, the frequency and severity of flooding of these rivers and the consequent poor state of much of the road for extended periods, and its steep, winding nature as it crossed the intermediate hills between each river valley.

The passing of the Main Roads Act of 1924 through the Parliament of New South Wales provided for the declaration of Main Roads, roads partially funded by the State government through the Main Roads Board (MRB, later Transport for NSW). Great Northern Highway was declared (as Main Road No. 9) on 8 August 1928, running from North Sydney via Hornsby, Peat's Ferry, Gosford, Swansea, Newcastle, Maitland, Singleton, Tamworth, Armidale, Glen Innes, Tenterfield and Woodenbong to the border with Queensland; with the passing of the Main Roads (Amendment) Act of 1929 to provide for additional declarations of State Highways and Trunk Roads, this was amended to State Highway 9 on 8 April 1929. This was renamed New England Highway, through Queensland on 14 February 1933, and a month later through New South Wales on 14 March 1933, running from Hexham, Maitland, Singleton, Tamworth, Armidale, Glen Innes, Tenterfield, Woodenbong and Beaudesert to Brisbane.

In November 1949, a sealed road was opened through Cunninghams Gap, linking south-western Brisbane to Warwick, to eventually supplant the route via Mount Lindesay as the main Brisbane-Sydney traffic route as far south as Tenterfield. As a result, New England Highway was re-routed through Warwick along the route that was then known in Queensland as the Lockyer-Darling Downs Highway on 11 August 1954. Against the wishes of the Beaudesert Shire Council and the Woodenbong Chamber of Commerce, the former alignment of New England Highway from Tenterfield through Beaudesert to Brisbane was re-declared Mount Lindesay Highway, after Mount Lindesay, the residue of a solidified magma core, that is part of the Mount Warning volcanic area and is situated in the western extreme of Border Ranges National Park. The NSW Department of Main Roads (which had succeeded the New South Wales MRB in 1932), declared the New South Wales section as State Highway 24, from Tenterfield via Legume and Woodenbong to the state border with Queensland.

The New South Wales section of Mount Lindesay Highway, which still included unsealed portions, was eventually de-gazetted as a highway by NSW Department of Main Roads on 23 December 1981 due to very low traffic volumes, it was renamed Mount Lindesay Road and re-declared as Main Road 622. This left the Queensland section as the only surviving part of the highway. Within New South Wales, Summerland Way was consequently extended north 9.4 km along the alignment of the former highway to meet the Queensland end of the highway at the state border, and the eastern end of Mount Lindesay Road was truncated at the intersection with Summerland Way just east of Woodenbong.

Between 2007 and 2009 4.5 kilometres (2.8 mi) of the highway in the Logan City local government area was upgraded. As well as providing dual carriageways, the work included building service roads so that local traffic does not have to travel on the main carriageways, thereby reducing congestion.

== Upgrades ==
Date	Details
September 2017	Beaudesert Town Centre Bypass.
Early 2020	North Maclean safety improvements.
Early 2020	South Maclean safety improvements.
October 2020	Camp Cable to Johanna Street Jimboomba.
November 2020	Rosia Road to Stoney Camp Road.

=== Projects ===
List of projects on the Mount Lindesay Highway
Project	Length (km)	Construction dates		Value	Status	Description	Distance from Brisbane (km)
Project	Length (km)	Start	End	Value	Status	Description	Distance from Brisbane (km)
Johanna Street to South Street (Jimboomba).	1.5	Mid 2022		$53 million	Detailed design	Highway duplication	
Key locations between Jimboomba and Beaudesert.			Late 2022	$17.137 million	Under construction	Improve intersections	
Stoney Camp Road to Chambers Flat Road.		March 2021	Early 2023	$75 million	Completed	Construct additional lanes	
Beaudesert Road and Illaweena Street intersection.		June 2022		$30 million	Under construction	Intersection upgrade	

== Towns and Localities on the Mount Lindesay Highway (QLD) & Mount Lindesay Road (NSW) ==
From north to south, the following towns, suburbs and localities are either bounded by or passed through by the Mount Lindesday Highway and Mount Lindesay Road respectively:

- Moorooka – commences in
  Brisbane City (through)
- Salisbury (through and boundary)
- Rocklea (through and boundary)
- Coopers Plains (boundary)
- Archerfield (boundary)
- Acacia Ridge (through and boundary)
- Sunnybank Hills (boundary)
- Algester (boundary)
- Calamvale (through and boundary)
- Parkinson (boundary)
- Drewvale (boundary)
- Browns Plains – crosses into
  Logan City (boundary)
- Hillcrest (boundary)
- Regents Park (boundary)
- Boronia Heights (boundary)
- Park Ridge (through and boundary)
- Greenbank (boundary)
- Park Ridge South (through and boundary)
- Munruben (through and boundary)
- North Maclean (through)
- South Maclean (through and boundary)
- Jimboomba (through and boundary)
- Cedar Grove (through and boundary)
- Cedar Vale (boundary)
- Woodhill (through)
- Veresdale – (through), boundary between
  Logan City and Scenic Rim Region
- Gleneagle – Scenic Rim Region (through)
- Beaudesert (through and boundary)
- Cryna (boundary)
- Josephville (through)
- Laravale (through and boundary)
- Tamrookum (through and boundary)
- Innisplain (through and boundary)
- Tamrookum Creek (boundary)
- Rathdowney (through)
- Palen Creek (through)
- Mount Barney (boundary)
- Mount Lindesay (through and boundary)
- Woodenbong, New South Wales (through)
- Koreelah, New South Wales (through)
- Legume, New South Wales (through)
- Lower Acacia Creek, New South Wales (through)
- Cullendore, New South Wales (through)
- Wylie Creek, New South Wales (through)
- Liston, New South Wales (through)
- Amosfield, New South Wales (through)
- Willsons Downfall, New South Wales (through)
- Bookookoorara, New South Wales (through)
- Carrolls Creek, New South Wales (through)
- Boonoo Boonoo, New South Wales (through)
- Tenterfield, New South Wales (through and boundary)

== Major intersections ==
State	LGA	Location	km	mi	Destinations	Notes
Queensland	Brisbane	Moorooka	0	0.0	Ipswich Road (A7) – Annerley, Rocklea	Northern terminus of Beaudesert Road and National Route 13
Queensland	Brisbane	Moorooka–Salisbury boundary	2.2	1.4	Evans Road (State Route 20) – Rocklea, Salisbury	
Queensland	Brisbane	Rocklea–Salisbury–Archerfield–Coopers Plains quadripoint	4.0	2.5	Riawena Road (Metroad 2 east) – Robertson; Granard Road (Metroad 2 west) – Rocklea	
Queensland	Brisbane	Archerfield–Coopers Plains boundary	5.1	3.2	Boundary Road (State Route 56 east) – Sunnybank; Boundary Road (west) – Archerfield	
Queensland	Brisbane	Acacia Ridge	8.6	5.3	Bradman Street (State Route 11) – Acacia Ridge, Algester	
Queensland	Brisbane	Acacia Ridge–Algester–Sunnybank Hills tripoint	9.1	5.7	Learoyd Road (State Route 30 west) – Willawong; Hellawell Road (east) – Sunnybank Hills	Concurrency with State Route 30
Queensland	Brisbane	Sunnybank Hills–Calamvale boundary	10.8	6.7	Compton Road (State Route 30 east) – Stretton	Concurrency with State Route 30
Queensland	Brisbane	Parkinson–Drewvale boundary	15.0	9.3	Logan Motorway (M2) – Drewvale, Parkinson	Partial cloverleaf interchange Southern terminus of Beaudesert Road, northern terminus of Mount Lindsay Highway
Queensland	Logan	Parkinson–Hillcrest–Browns Plains tripoint	16.6	10.3	Browns Plains Road (State Route 94 east) – Browns Plains; Johnson Road (west) – Hillcrest	Modified diamond interchange
Queensland	Logan	Park Ridge	21.2	13.2	Park Ridge Road (State Route 64 east) – Park Ridge; Crest Road (west) – Greenbank	Modified diamond interchange
Queensland	Logan	Munruben–North Maclean boundary	28.0	17.4	Chambers Flat Road (State Route 59 east) – Chambers Flat; Crowson Lane (west) – North Maclean	Modified diamond interchange
Queensland	Logan	Jimboomba	34.9	21.7	Camp Cable Road (State Route 88) – Logan Village	
Queensland	Scenic Rim	Beaudesert	57.6	35.8	Beaudesert–Nerang Road (State Route 90 east) – Tamborine	Concurrency with State Route 90
Queensland	Scenic Rim	Beaudesert	58.0	36.0	Beaudesert–Boonah Road (State Route 90 west) – Boonah	Concurrency with State Route 90
Queensland	Scenic Rim	Rathdowney	88.9	55.2	Running Creek Road, to Lions Road – Running Creek, Loadstone	
Queensland	Scenic Rim	Rathdowney	90.0	55.9	Boonah–Rathdowney Road (State Route 93) – Boonah	
Queensland	Scenic Rim	Mount Lindesay–Mount Barney boundary	116.0	72.1	Mount Lindesay Highway (National Route 13)	Southern terminus of Mount Lindesay Highway and National Route 13
State border			116.0	72.1	Queensland – New South Wales state border	
New South Wales	Kyogle	Lindesay Creek–Dairy Flat boundary	116.0	72.1	Summerland Way (B91) – Woodenbong, Kyogle, Casino, Grafton	Northern terminus of Summerland Way and route B91
1.000 mi = 1.609 km; 1.000 km = 0.621 mi: Concurrency terminus; Route transition

== Gallery ==
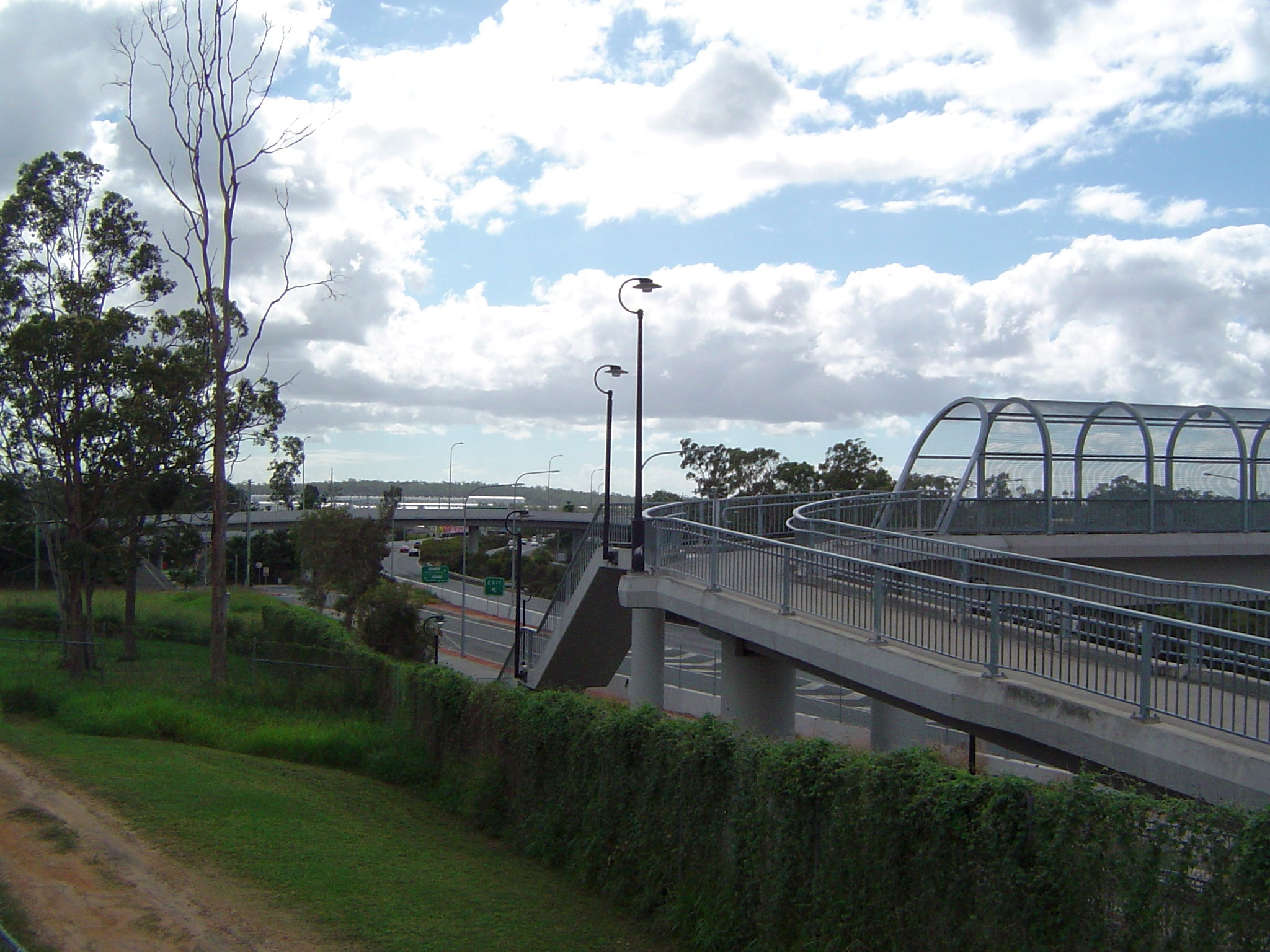
Overpass and footbridge at Hillcrest, Logan City, 2014

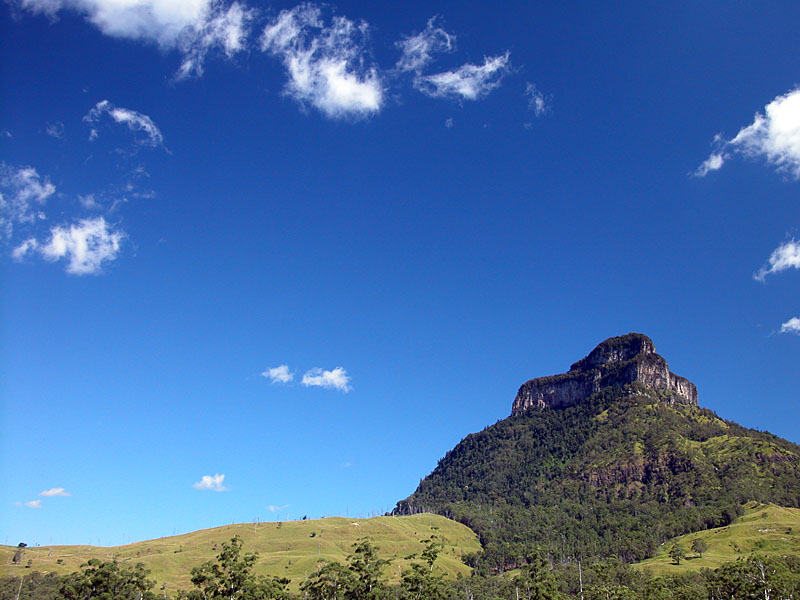
Mount Lindesay, located adjacent to the Mount Lindesay Highway.

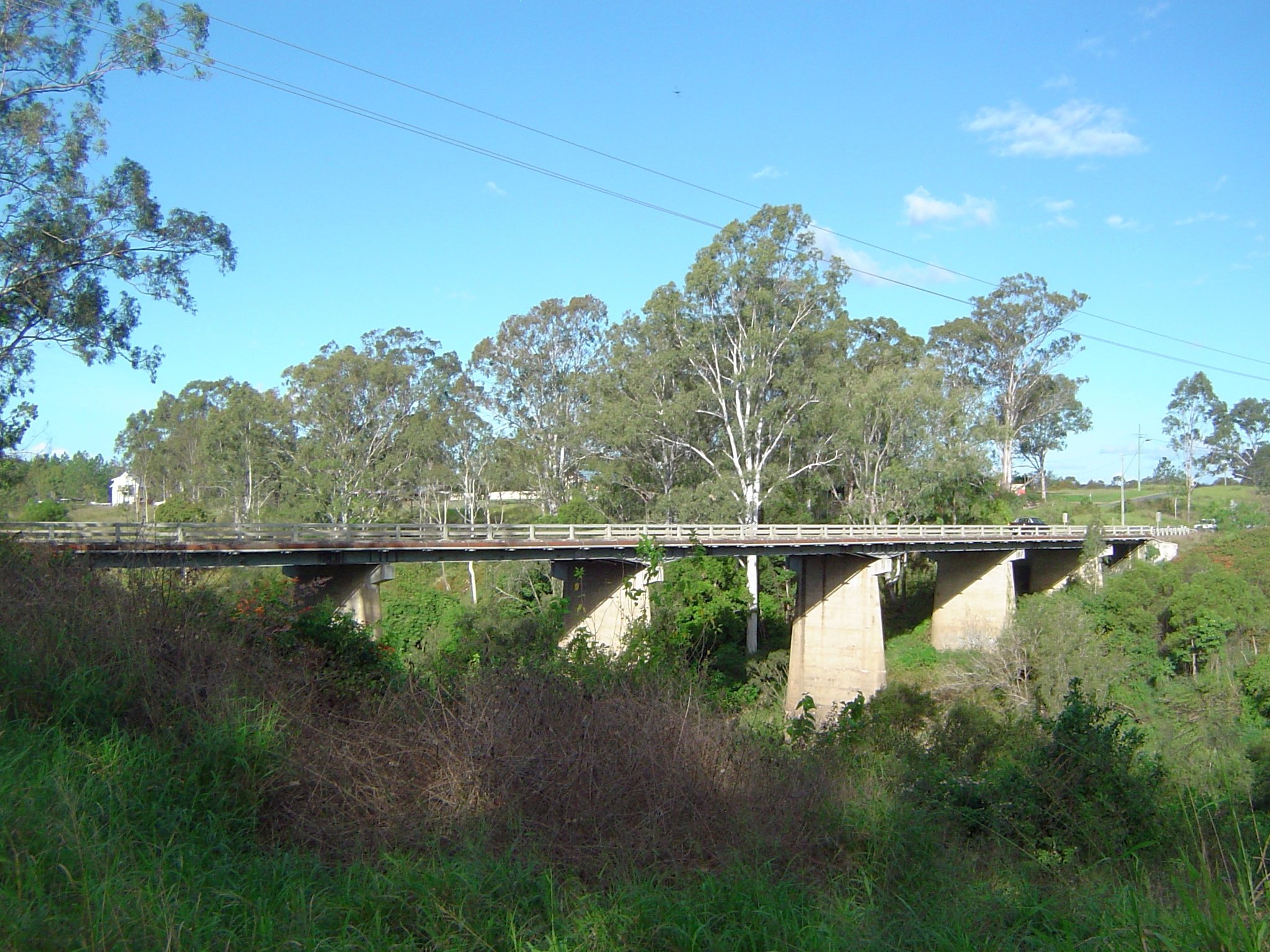
Maclean Bridge at North Maclean, 2014

== See also ==
- Highways in Australia
- List of highways in Queensland
