= Running Creek, Queensland =

Running Creek
- Suburb
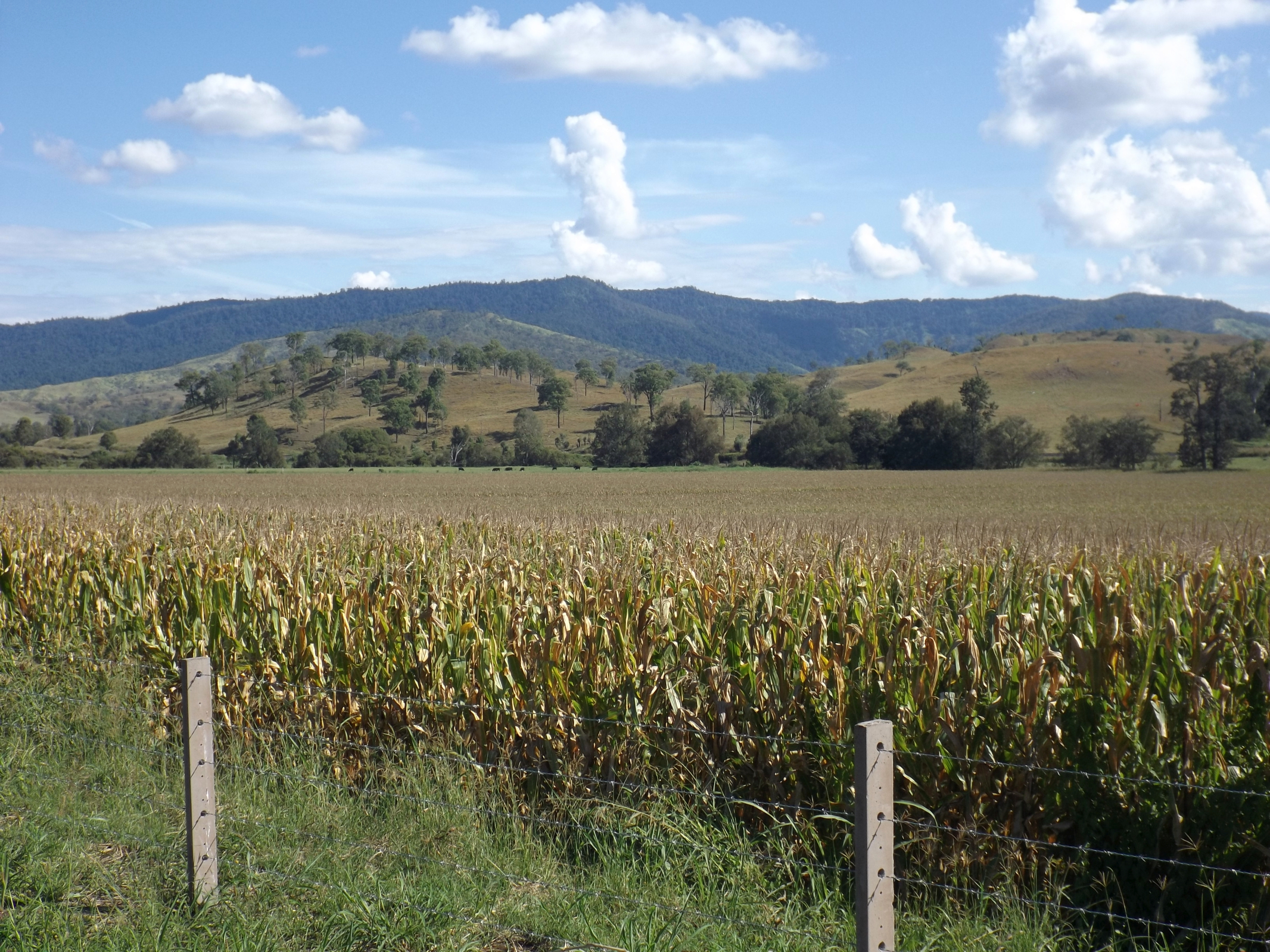
- McPherson Range and corn crop, 2016

- Interactive map of Running Creek
- Coordinates: 28.2719°S 152.9088°E
- Country: Australia
- State: Queensland
- LGA: Scenic Rim Region
- Location: 14.2 km (8.8 mi) SSE of Rathdowney; 42.7 km (26.5 mi) SSW of Beaudesert; 111 km (69 mi) SSW of Brisbane

Government
  - State electorate: Scenic Rim
  - Federal division: Wright

Area
  - Total: 112.4 km^{2} (43.4 sq mi)

Population
  - Total: 146 (2021 census)
  - Density: 1.299/km^{2} (3.364/sq mi)
- Time zone: UTC+10:00 (AEST)
- Postcode: 4287
Suburbs around Running Creek
Rathdowney	Innisplain	Oaky Creek
Palen Creek	Running Creek	Chinghee Creek; Mount Gipps
Palen Creek	Gradys Creek (NSW); Findon Creek (NSW)	Cougal (NSW)

Running Creek is a rural locality in the Scenic Rim Region, Queensland, Australia. In the 2021 census, Running Creek had a population of 146 people. It borders New South Wales.

== Geography ==
The locality is bounded to the south by the ridgeline of the McPherson Range (which defines the Queensland border with New South Wales). The watercourse Running Creek (from which the locality takes its name) rises in Lamington on the northern slopes of the McPherson Range and enters the locality from the south-west (Mount Gipps) and then flows north through the locality exiting to the north-west (Rathdowney), where it immediately becomes a tributary of the Logan River (28.2108°S 152.8789°E).

Running Creek has the following mountains:

- Grass Tree Knob (28.3095°S 152.9850°E) 524 metres (1,719 ft)
- Lawn Hill (28.2834°S 152.9529°E) 454 metres (1,490 ft)
- Mount Chinghee (28.3003°S 152.9576°E) 773 metres (2,536 ft)

Running Creek has the following mountain passes:

- Gradys Gap Gate (28.3321°S 152.9643°E)
- Richmond Gap (28.3319°S 152.9729°E)

There are a number of neighbourhoods in Running Creek:

- Dulbolla (28.2141°S 152.8813°E)
- Glenapp (28.2733°S 152.9069°E)
- Waiweer (28.3094°S 152.8975°E)

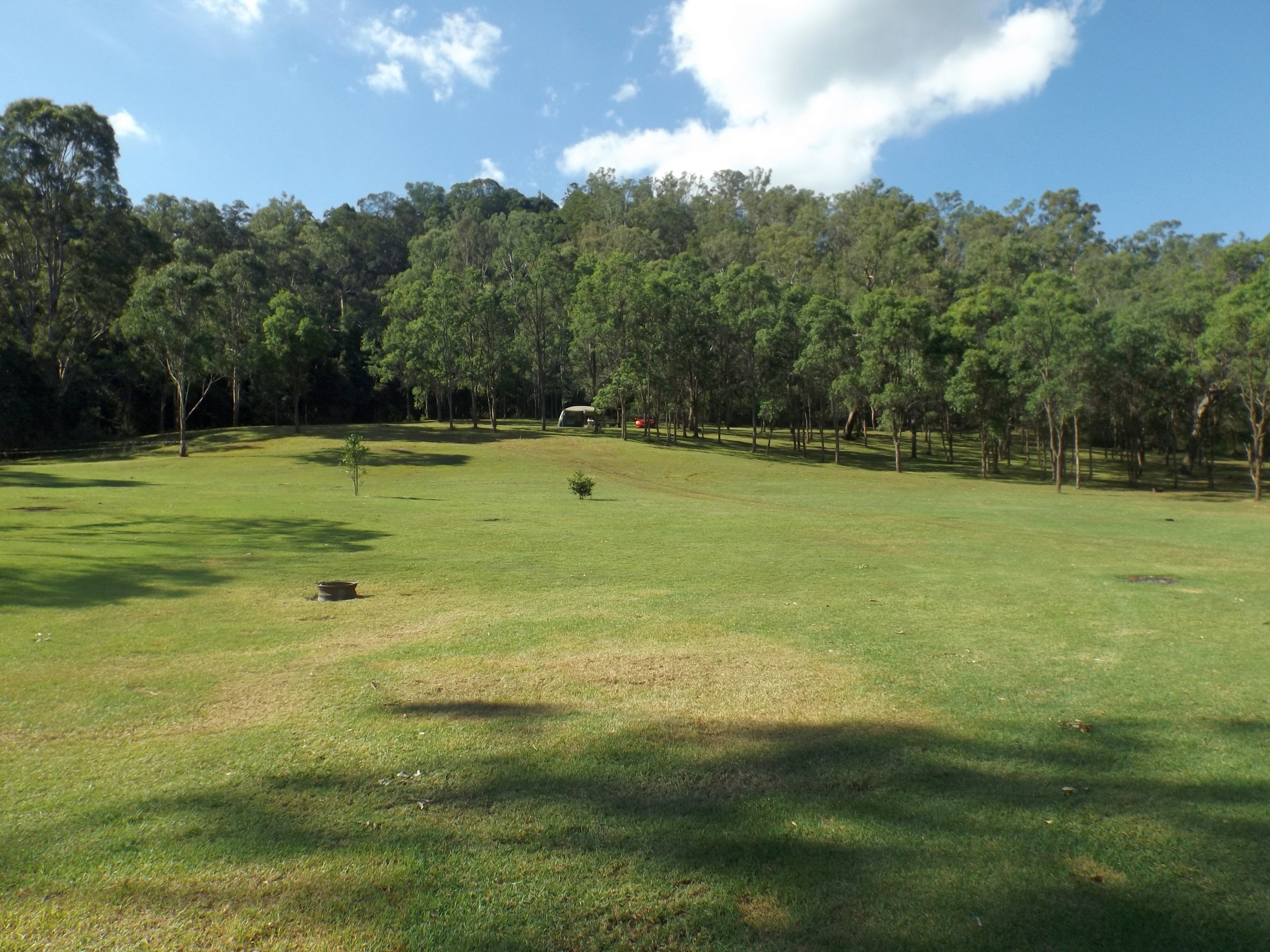
Camping by Mount Chinghee National Park, 2016

Mount Chinghee and Mount Chinghee National Park (28.3003°S 152.9475°E) are located in the south east of Running Creek. The national park has no walking tracks or visitor facilities. It aims to protect remnant rainforest and preserve habitat.

The Sydney–Brisbane rail corridor traverses the length of the north south axis of Running Creek. At the border the railway enters a tunnel and then traverses the Cougal Spiral.

Nearby the Lions Road passes through Richmond Gap on the McPherson Range and links to Cougal in northern New South Wales.

The terrain is generally hilly with elevations rising in the south to well above 600 metres along the McPherson Range. It covers the area roughly equivalent to the catchment formed by Running Creek, with the exception of its most upper parts which lie in Mount Gipps and Southern Lamington. Running Creek, itself a tributary of the Logan River, has a number of tributaries including New Year Creek and Camp Creek. Vegetation has been cleared in many parts for primary production purposes.

== History ==
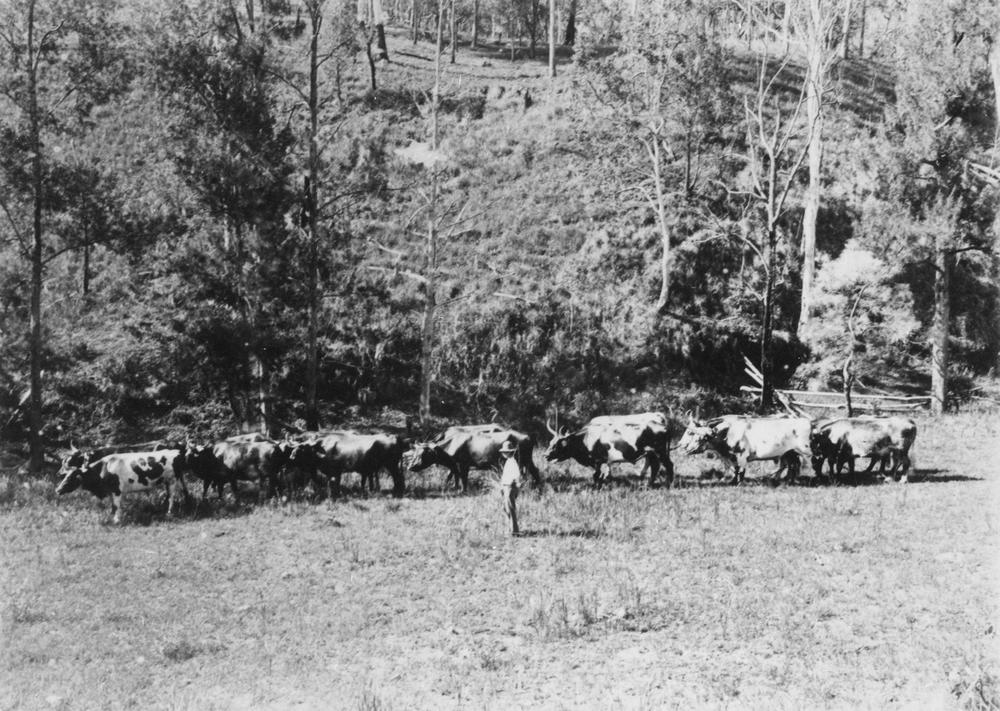
A bullock team, 1900

Timber was an important early industry in the area. There were sawmills at Running Creek and Glenapp. These sawmills no longer exist.

Glenapp Provisional School opened on 19 August 1901. On 1 January 1909 it became Glenapp State School. It closed on 9 December 1960. It was located on the eastern side of Running Creek Road south of the junction with Spring Creek Road (28.2656°S 152.9109°E).

The Beaudesert Shire Tramway operated between Beaudesert to Rathdowney and Lamington from 1903 to 1944. It had a stop in Running Creek called Dulbolla station (28.2142°S 152.8828°E).

The Glenapp railway signal box is located on the eastern side of the Brisbane-to-Sydney railway line at Running Creek (28.2845°S 152.9057°E). The hut was established in 1930 and is only one of a few remaining intact in the country. Having been made redundant due to automation, it was proposed to demolish the Glenapp signal box in 2007. However, the "Glenapp boys" Den and Rob Sibson, who had grown up in the Glenapp community, decided to rescue and restore the signal box as a small museum. The Glenapp railway siding was relocated to the Rathdowney Historical Museum.

Telemon Environment Park which later became known as Mount Chinghee National Park was first gazetted in 1994.

== Demographics ==
In the 2011 census, Running Creek and surrounding localities had a population of 463 people.

In the 2016 census, Running Creek had a population of 147 people.

In the 2021 census, Running Creek had a population of 146 people.

== Education ==
There are no schools in Running Creek. The nearest government primary school is Rathdowney State School in neighbouring Rathdowney to the north-west. The nearest government secondary school is Beaudesert State High School in Beaudesert.

== See also ==
- List of tramways in Queensland
