= Mount Lindesay, Queensland =

Mount Lindesay
- Suburb
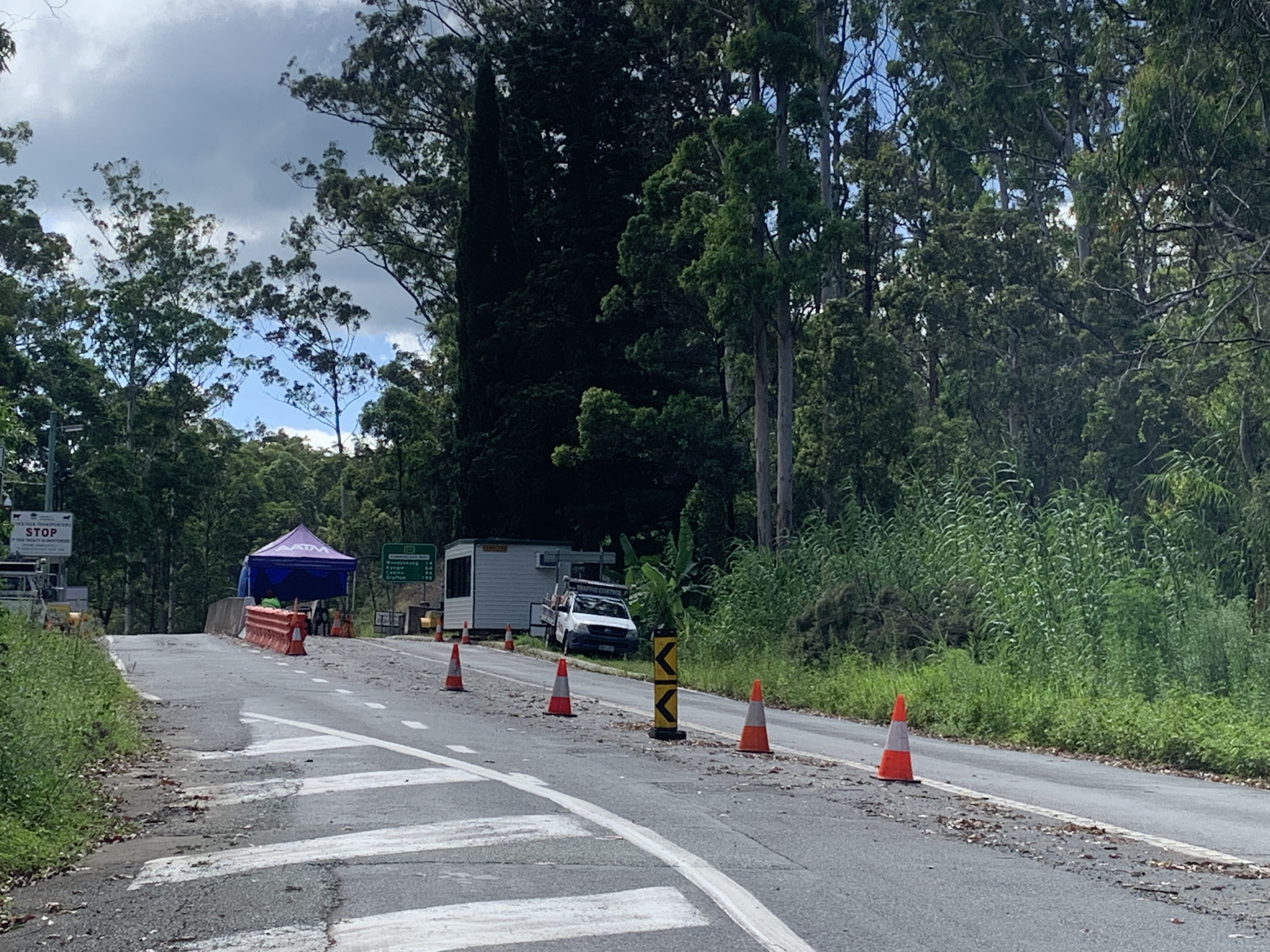
- ] COVID-19 border checkpoint in Mount Lindesay, 16 January 2022 (the day after the borders re-opened)]

- Interactive map of Mount Lindesay
- Coordinates: 28.3305°S 152.7333°E
- Country: Australia
- State: Queensland
- LGA: Scenic Rim Region
- Location: 22.4 km (13.9 mi) SW of Rathdowney; 53.8 km (33.4 mi) SW of Beaudesert; 123 km (76 mi) SSW of Brisbane CBD

Government
  - State electorate: Scenic Rim
  - Federal division: Wright

Area
  - Total: 17.1 km^{2} (6.6 sq mi)

Population
  - Total: 14 (2021 census)
  - Density: 0.82/km^{2} (2.12/sq mi)
- Time zone: UTC+10:00 (AEST)
- Postcode: 4287
Suburbs around Mount Lindesay
Mount Barney	Mount Barney	Palen Creek
Mount Barney	Mount Lindesay	Palen Creek
Dairy Flat (NSW)	Dairy Flat (NSW)	Palen Creek

Mount Lindesay
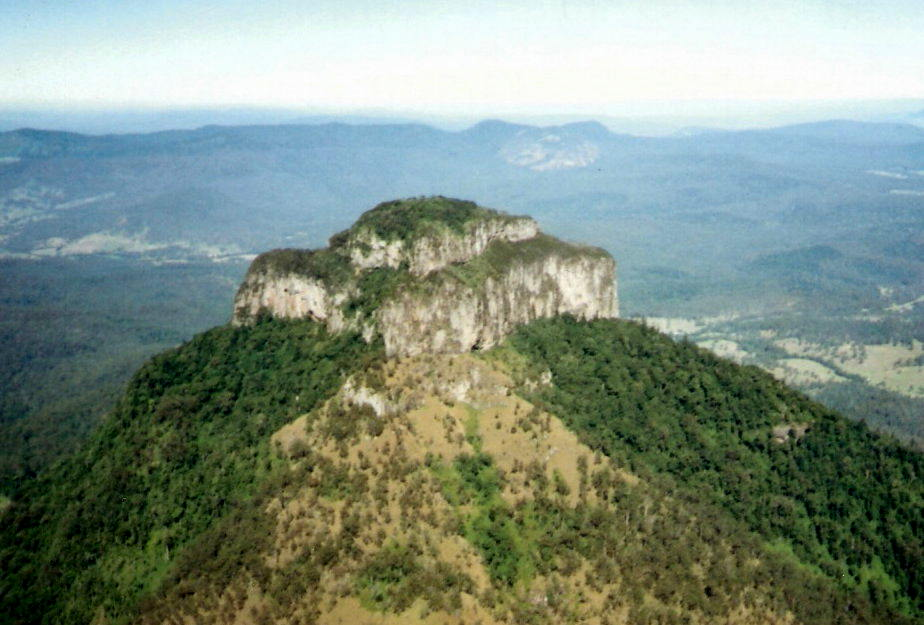
- The distinctly shaped peak of Mount Lindesay

Highest point
- Elevation: 1,177 m (3,862 ft)

Geography
- Location within Queensland
- Location: Queensland, Australia
- Parent range: McPherson Range

Climbing
- First ascent: 1872

Mount Lindesay is a rural locality in the Scenic Rim Region, Queensland, Australia. It borders New South Wales. In the 2021 census, Mount Lindesay had a population of 14 people.

The mountain of the same name (height 1,175 metres (3,855 ft) is on the south-west boundary of the locality (28.3447°S 152.7228°E) on the border between Queensland and New South Wales.

== Geography ==
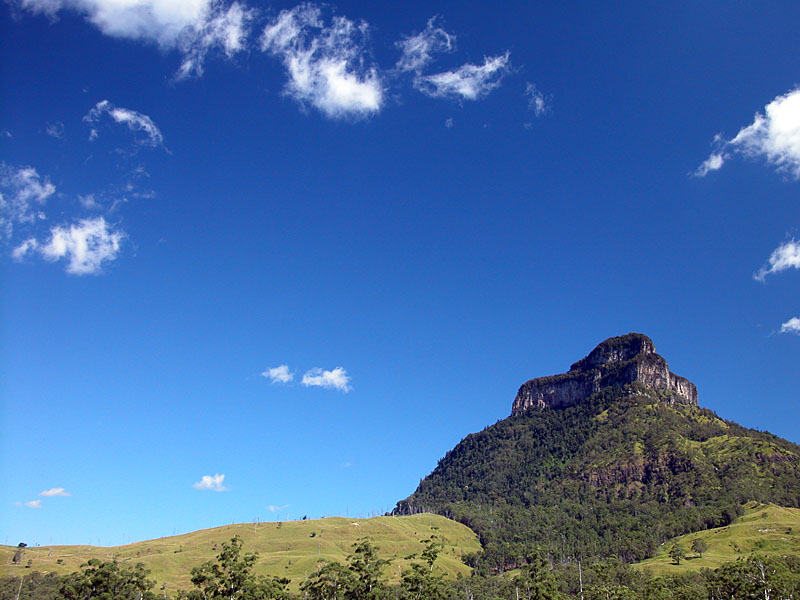
Mount Lindesay from the Mount Lindesay Highway

The mountain lies on the Queensland-New South Wales border, approximately 140 km south west of Brisbane, Australia. Mount Lindesay is one of a number of peaks in the McPherson Range, and is remarkable for its tiered summit, the eroded remnant of lava flows from the nearby Focal Peak shield volcano. The mountain is situated within the Mount Barney National Park in Queensland and the Border Ranges National Park in New South Wales. Apart from the northern slopes, the rest of the peak is covered in dense rainforest, and the summit is frequently in cloud and mist.

The Mount Lindesay Highway enters the locality from the north-east (Palen Creek), passes to the west side of the mountain, and exits to the south-west (Dairy Flat, New South Wales).

== History ==
On 6 July 1828, the botanist and explorer Allan Cunningham originally named this mountain Mount Hooker after botanist William Hooker and called another mountain (now Mount Barney) by the name Mount Lindesay after Colonel Patrick Lindesay, the Commandant of Troops in New South Wales 1827–1836. Sometime in the late 1830s or early 1840s, either the New South Wales Surveyor-General Thomas Mitchell, or Moreton District surveyor Robert Dixon, are believed to have changed the names to be Mount Lindesay and Mount Barney (after Lieutenant-Colonel George Barney) respectively.

The first known European ascent of Mount Lindesay was most likely by Collector of Customs, William Thornton, and the Kinchela brothers, John and James, sometime between 1846 and 1848. All were stationed in Queensland at the time and knew each other well with the Kinchela brothers based at Telemon station on the Upper Logan within sight of the mountain.

The first recorded (and second) ascent of Mount Lindesay was made in May 1872, by Thomas de Montmorency Murray-Prior (1848-1902) and Phillip Walter Pears (1846-1924). At the time of the 1872 ascent, an Aboriginal elder at nearby Unumgar station claimed to Pears that his father had once climbed the peak.

The second recorded (and third) ascent of Mount Lindesay was made in July 1890, by the Norwegian naturalist and explorer Carsten Egeberg Borchgrevink (1864-1934), then working in the district as a surveyor's labourer, and Edwin Villiers-Brown, of Beaudesert. There were a further eight recorded ascents by the late 1920s, when pioneering climbers such as Bert Salmon (1899-1982) started visiting the peak regularly. The first women to climb Mount Lindesay were Brisbane climbers Jean Easton and Nora Dimes, who made the ascent with Bert Salmon in March 1931.

On 26 December 1928, Mount Lindesay was the site of the first known recreational climbing fatality in Australia, when Edwin Lyle Vidler fell to his death whilst attempting a solo ascent of Vidler's Chimney. He is buried in a grave in the rainforest, not far from where he fell. The crevice he attempted to climb up is now known as Vidler's Chimney and the first successful ascent was not until 1953. In 1992, descendants of the Vidler family of Jamberoo erected a memorial outside the Rathdowney Information Centre and Historical Museum in Rathdowney.

Mount Lindesay National Park was gazetted in 1947. In 1980, it was incorporated into an enlarged Mount Barney National Park.

In August 1978 The Northern Star newspaper reported 3 local men (Stephen Marsh, Peter Taylor and Lewis Reid) climbed the mountain and signed a book in a metal container on the peak containing the names of members of another local expedition a few years earlier (John Martin, Barry Martin, Philip Martin, Raymond Martin, Neil Mahoney, George Ellen, John Gorman and John Bushell).

On 29 November 2008, the mountain was part of a successful native title claim made by the Trevor Close on behalf of the Githabul people, for whom the peak holds a special significance.

On 19 June 2011, Ross Miller, one of a party of six, fell to his death while climbing in a designated area.

In November 2019, a bushfire from the south burned across the mountain above the cliffs for the first time in living memory, reaching the summit from the western side. Most of the forest on top was burned, apart from several narrow bands on the lower veranda and a small area of rainforest, east of the summit. The fire significantly impacted the "tourist route", particularly on the lower cliff, with much of the vegetation destroyed, leaving unstable and potentially dangerous sections.

During the COVID-19 pandemic from March 2020 to 15 January 2022, there was a police checkpoint on the Mount Lindesday Highway where it crosses into New South Wales (28.33700°S 152.70030°E) to restrict the movement of people and hence the transmission of COVID-19.

== Demographics ==
In the 2016 census, Mount Lindesay had a population of 3 people.

In the 2021 census, Mount Lindesay had a population of 14 people.

== Education ==
There are no schools in Mount Lindesay. The nearest government primary school is Rathdowney State School in Rathdowney to the north-east. The nearest government secondary school is Beaudesert State High School in Beaudesert, further to the north-east. A Catholic primary school and a Catholic secondary school are also in Beaudesert.

== Attractions ==
The Mount Lindesay area circa 1955–1956.

Despite appearances, Mount Lindesay offers few opportunities for rock-climbers, due to the unsound nature of the rock (decaying rhyolite). There is one steep and exposed scrambling route to the summit, rated at approximately grade 6–7, which starts at the south east corner of the upper cliffs. However, this is not a bushwalking route as such, and anyone making an ascent should have basic rock-climbing and abseiling skills, or be under the guidance of experienced rock-climbers.

== See also ==
- List of mountains in Australia
