= Barney View, Queensland =

Barney View
- Suburb
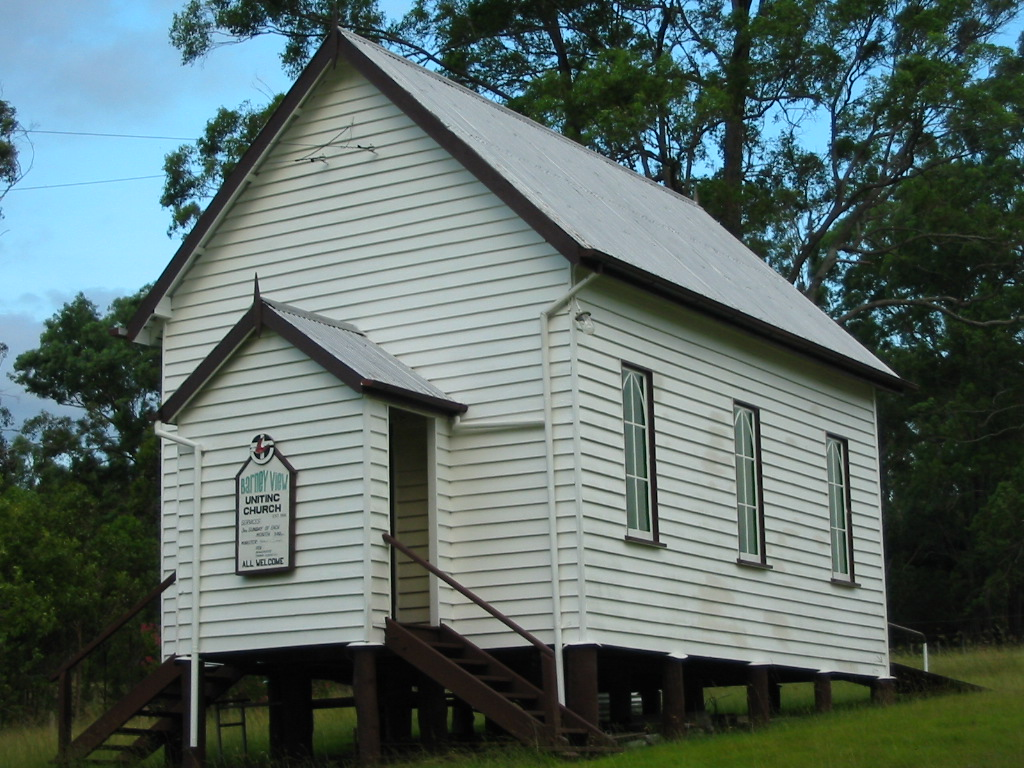
- Barney View Community Church (formerly Methodist/Uniting), 2006

- Interactive map of Barney View
- Coordinates: 28.2375°S 152.7644°E
- Country: Australia
- State: Queensland
- LGA: Scenic Rim Region
- Location: 13.3 km (8.3 mi) WSW of Rathdowney; 39.3 km (24.4 mi) SSE of Boonah; 44.6 km (27.7 mi) SW of Beaudesert; 114 km (71 mi) SSW of Brisbane CBD

Government
  - State electorate: Scenic Rim
  - Federal division: Wright

Area
  - Total: 36.7 km^{2} (14.2 sq mi)

Population
  - Total: 38 (2021 census)
  - Density: 1.035/km^{2} (2.68/sq mi)
- Time zone: UTC+10:00 (AEST)
- Postcode: 4287
Suburbs around Barney View
| Maroon | Rathdowney | Rathdowney |
| Maroon | Barney View | Palen Creek |
| Maroon | Mount Barney; Palen Creek | Palen Creek |

Barney View is a rural locality in the Scenic Rim Region, Queensland, Australia. In the 2021 census, Barney View had a population of 38 people.

== Geography ==
Mount Maroon rises to 966 metres (3,169 ft) above sea level in the west of Barney View. This western section is protected within Mount Barney National Park. The upper Logan River passes through the west of the locality and marks a portion of the western border. In the south the terrain rises to more than 500 metres (1,600 ft) along the northern slopes of Mount Giles.

== History ==
Barney View was originally known as Thulimbah, which was frequently confused with another Queensland district of the same name, Thulimbah near Stanthorpe. The problem was resolved in 1916 by changing the name to Barney View (due to its location beside Mount Barney).

Thulimbah Methodist Church was opened free of debt on 14 June 1908; it was built from timber sourced from local trees. It was renamed Barney View Methodist Church when the district's name changed. Following the amalgamation of the Methodist Church into the Uniting Church in Australia in 1977, it became Barney View United Church. On 6 November 2016 it closed as a Uniting church closed and was leased to the community as Barney View Community Church.

Barney View Lutheran church was dedicated on Wednesday 16 November 1910 with sermons in both German and English. The church closed in 1966. In the 1970s the church building was relocated to Rathdowney to extend the Rathdowney Methodist (later Uniting) Church. The Lutheran Church still owns the land on Barney View Road (now just within the boundaries of Palen Creek, 28.2672°S 152.7884°E) and operates it as a campsite called Abode Park. It is named after Pastor Armin Bode who was a Lutheran minister in the Parish of Teviotville (which included Barney View) from 1915 to 1969. A memorial at the park commemorates the former church.

Following the closure of the Readville (Widgee Creek) State School in 1911, it was decided in April 1918 to relocate the building to establish a school at Barney View. Barney View State School opened on 4 October 1918. It had a temporary closure from 1938 to circa 1941 due to low student numbers. It closed permanently in March 1961. It was at 504 Barney View Road (28.2534°S 152.7956°E).

== Demographics ==
At the 2016 census, Barney View had a population of 64 people. The locality contains 32 households, in which 45.9% of the population are males and 54.1% of the population are females with a median age of 54, 16 years above the national average. The average weekly household income is $833, $605 below the national average.

In the 2021 census, Barney View had a population of 38 people.

== Heritage listings ==
Heritage-listed sites at Barney View include:

- 101 Mount Barney Road: Barney View Church and Cemetery

== Amenities ==
Barney View Community Church is on Mount Barney Road (28.2417°S 152.7684°E).

== Education ==
There are no schools in Barney View. The nearest government primary school is Rathdowney State School in neighbouring Rathdowney to the north-east. The nearest government secondary school is Boonah State High School in Boonah to the north-west.

== Attractions ==
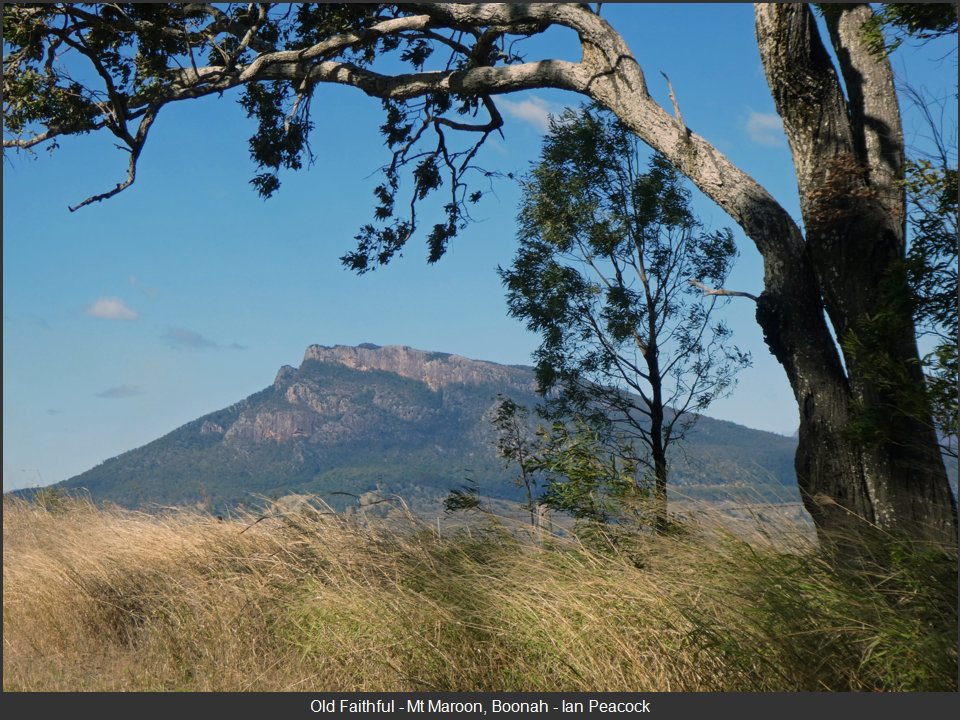
Mount Maroon, 2020

At 966 metres (3,169 ft), the summit of Mount Maroon provides 360 degree views.
