= Palen Creek, Queensland =

Palen Creek
- Suburb
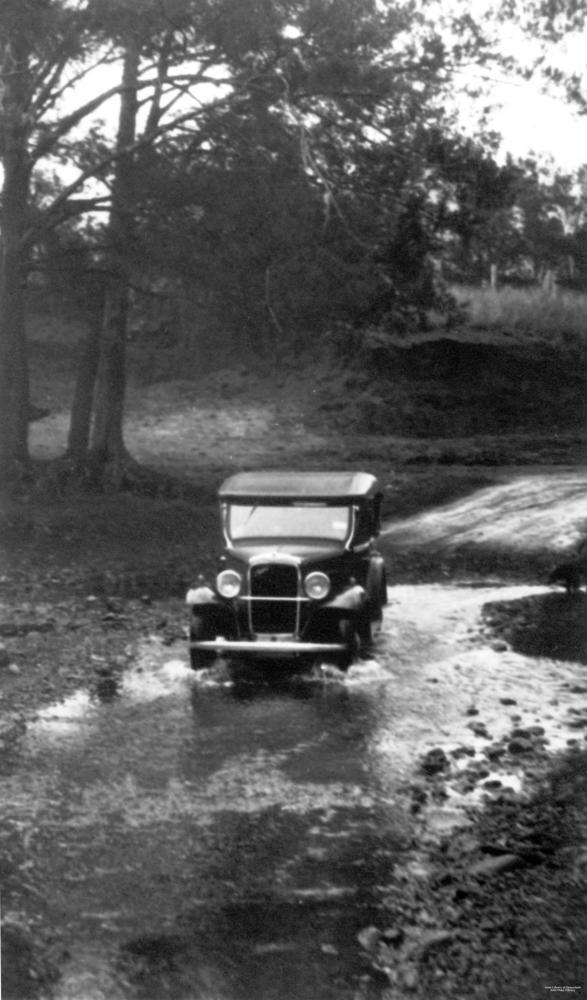
- Driving across Palen Creek, 1934

- Interactive map of Palen Creek
- Coordinates: 28.2886°S 152.8069°E
- Country: Australia
- State: Queensland
- LGA: Scenic Rim Region
- Location: 9.1 km (5.7 mi) SW of Rathdowney; 41.2 km (25.6 mi) SW of Beaudesert; 55.1 km (34.2 mi) SSe of Boonah; 110 km (68 mi) SSW of Brisbane

Government
  - State electorate: Scenic Rim
  - Federal division: Wright

Area
  - Total: 100.8 km^{2} (38.9 sq mi)

Population
  - Total: 368 (2021 census)
  - Density: 3.651/km^{2} (9.456/sq mi)
- Time zone: UTC+10:00 (AEST)
- Postcode: 4287
Suburbs around Palen Creek
Mount Barney	Barney View	Rathdowney
Mount Lindesay	Palen Creek	Running Creek
Dairy Flat (NSW)	Sawpit Creek (NSW)	Findon Creek (NSW)

Palen Creek is a rural locality in the Scenic Rim Region, Queensland, Australia. It borders New South Wales. In the 2021 census, Palen Creek had a population of 368 people.

Tylerville is a neighbourhood within Palen Creek (28.2931°S 152.7847°E).

== Geography ==
The terrain is rugged with many sloped sections heavily vegetated. Lower elevations start at around 90 metres (300 ft) above sea level while in the south the McPherson Range climbs above 600 metres (2,000 ft). In the southeast lies multiple sections of Palen State Forest and part of Mount Barney National Park. On the slopes of Mount Giles in the west is another forest reserve. Between the two, the Mount Lindesay Highway winds along the valley floor.

Palen Creek (the creek from which the locality takes its name) rises in the south of locality, just north of the border with New South Wales (28.3596°S 152.7606°E). It then flows north through the locality towards Rathdowney, where it becomes a tributary of the Logan River (28.2239°S 152.8583°E).

The Palen Creek Correctional Centre is located on the highway in the south west (28.3259°S 152.7695°E). The facility can hold up to 170 low-security prisoners in a rural environment.

== History ==
In 1877, 15,500 acres (6,300 ha) were resumed from the Melcombe and Palen pastoral runs and offered for selection on 17 April 1877.

Timber was an important early industry and there were two sawmills, one at Palen Creek owned by Campbells and one at Tylerville owned by Alfred John Raymond. These no longer exist.

Palen Creek Provisional School opened on 23 October 1893. On 1 January 1909 it became Palen Creek State School. It and closed in 1962. It was located near the Palen Creek School Road junction with the Mount Lindesay Highway (approx 28.2774°S 152.8002°E).

Tylerville State School opened on 18 January 1909. It closed in 1962. It was located on Mount Lindesay Highway (28.3157°S 152.7761°E).

Barney View Lutheran Church was dedicated on Wednesday 16 November 1910 with sermons in both German and English. The church closed in 1966. In the 1970s the church building was relocated to Rathdowney to extend the Rathdowney Methodist (later Uniting) Church. The Lutheran Church still owns the land on Barney View Road (now within the boundaries of Palen Creek, 28.2672°S 152.7884°E) and operates it as a campsite called Abode Park. It is named after Pastor Armin Bode who was a Lutheran minister in the Parish of Teviotville (which included Barney View) from 1915 to 1969. A memorial at the park commemorates the former church.

Palen Creek Methodist Church opened on Saturday 10 May 1913. In 1957 it was relocated to 39 Running Creek Road in Rathdowney. In the 1970s it was further extended with the Glenapp hall and the Barney View Lutheran Church. When the Methodist Church became part of the Uniting Church in Australia in 1977, it became the Palen Creek Uniting Church. It held its last service on Sunday 23 February 2014. It is now in private ownership.

== Demographics ==
At the 2011 census, Palen Creek and surrounds recorded a population of 219.

In the 2016 census, Palen Creek had a population of 280 people.

In the 2021 census, Palen Creek had a population of 368 people.

== Heritage listings ==
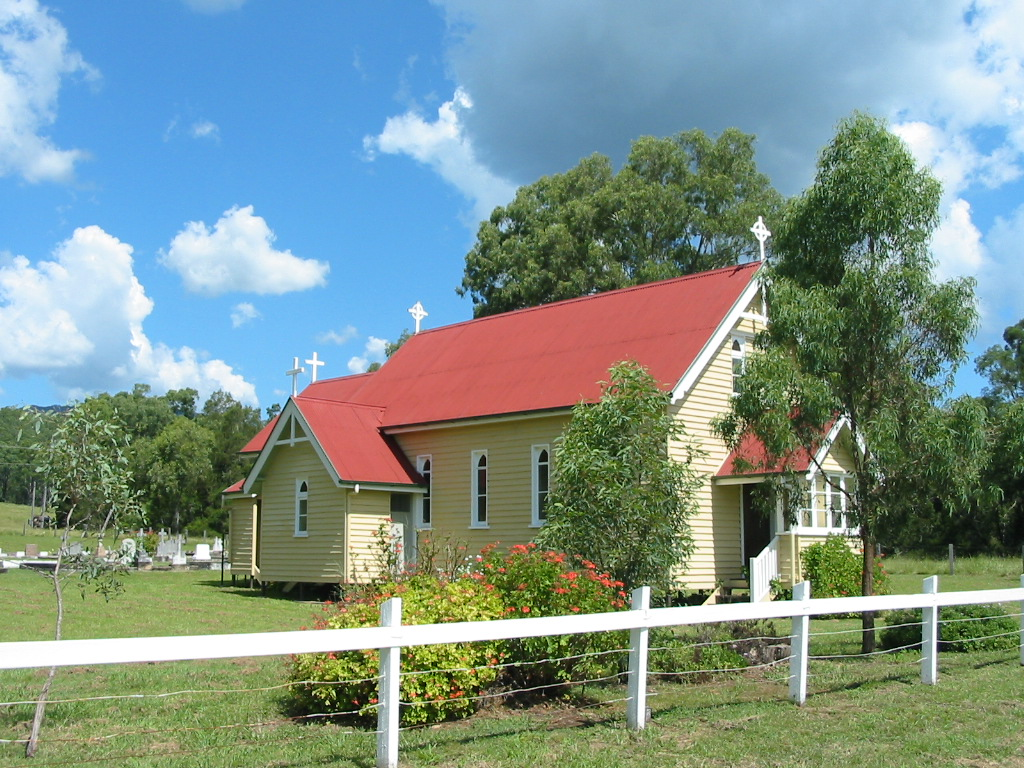
St James' Catholic Church and cemetery, 2006

Palen Creek has the following heritage-listed sites:

- 11605 Mount Lindesay Highway: St James Catholic Church and cemetery (28.2843°S 152.7930°E)

== Education ==
There are no schools in Palen Creek. The nearest government primary school is Rathdowney State School in neighbouring Rathdowney. The nearest government secondary schools are Beaudesert State High School in Beaudesert and Boonah State High School in Boonah.
