= Mount Gipps, Queensland =

Mount Gipps
- Suburb
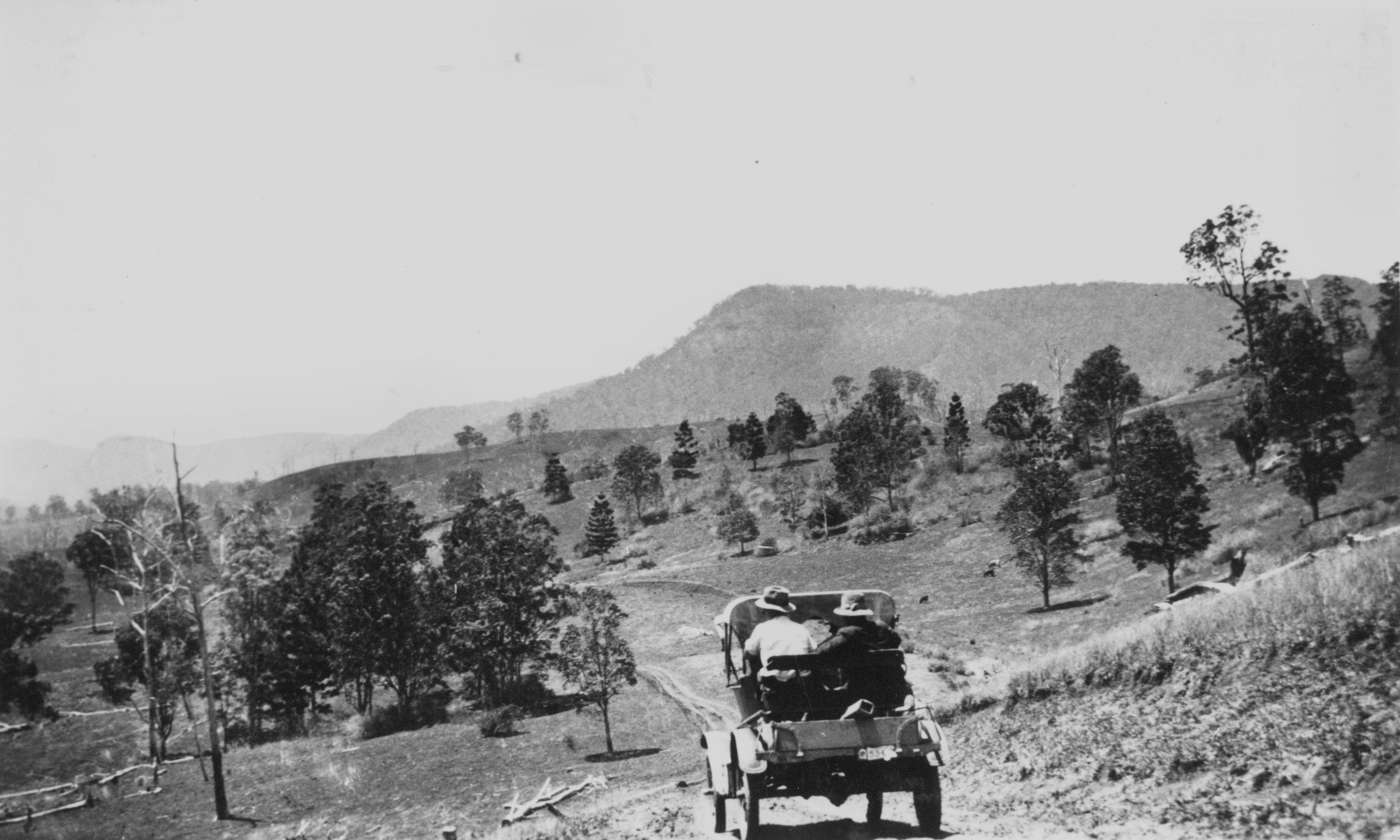
- Mount Gipps on McPherson Range, 1928

- Interactive map of Mount Gipps
- Coordinates: 28.3222°S 153.0097°E
- Country: Australia
- State: Queensland
- LGA: Scenic Rim Region
- Location: 42.8 km (26.6 mi) S of Beaudesert; 112 km (70 mi) S of Brisbane

Government
  - State electorate: Scenic Rim
  - Federal division: Wright

Area
  - Total: 15.7 km^{2} (6.1 sq mi)

Population
  - Total: 0 (2021 census)
  - Density: 0.00/km^{2} (0.00/sq mi)
- Time zone: UTC+10:00 (AEST)
- Postcode: 4285
Suburbs around Mount Gipps
Chinghee Creek	Chinghee Creek	Lamington
Running Creek	Mount Gipps	Southern Lamington
Cougall (NSW)	Cougall (NSW)	Southern Lamington

Mount Gipps is a rural locality in the Scenic Rim Region, Queensland, Australia. The locality borders New South Wales and is one end of the Queensland rabbit-proof fence. In the 2021 census, Mount Gipps had "no people or a very low population".

== Geography ==
Mount Gipps has high slopes to the south belonging to the McPherson Range and also in the north-east with a valley through the north-west and from west to east. The mountain Mount Gipps, from which the locality takes its name, is on the southern border of the locality with New South Wales (28.3419°S 152.9903°E); it rises to 785 metres (2,575 ft) above sea level.

Running Creek, a tributary of the Logan River, flows from east to west through the locality. Mount Gipps Road enters from Chinghee Creek in the north-west and follows through the valley. Although entirely freehold land, only the lower valley areas have been cleared and are used for grazing. The slopes have an extensive tree cover.

== History ==
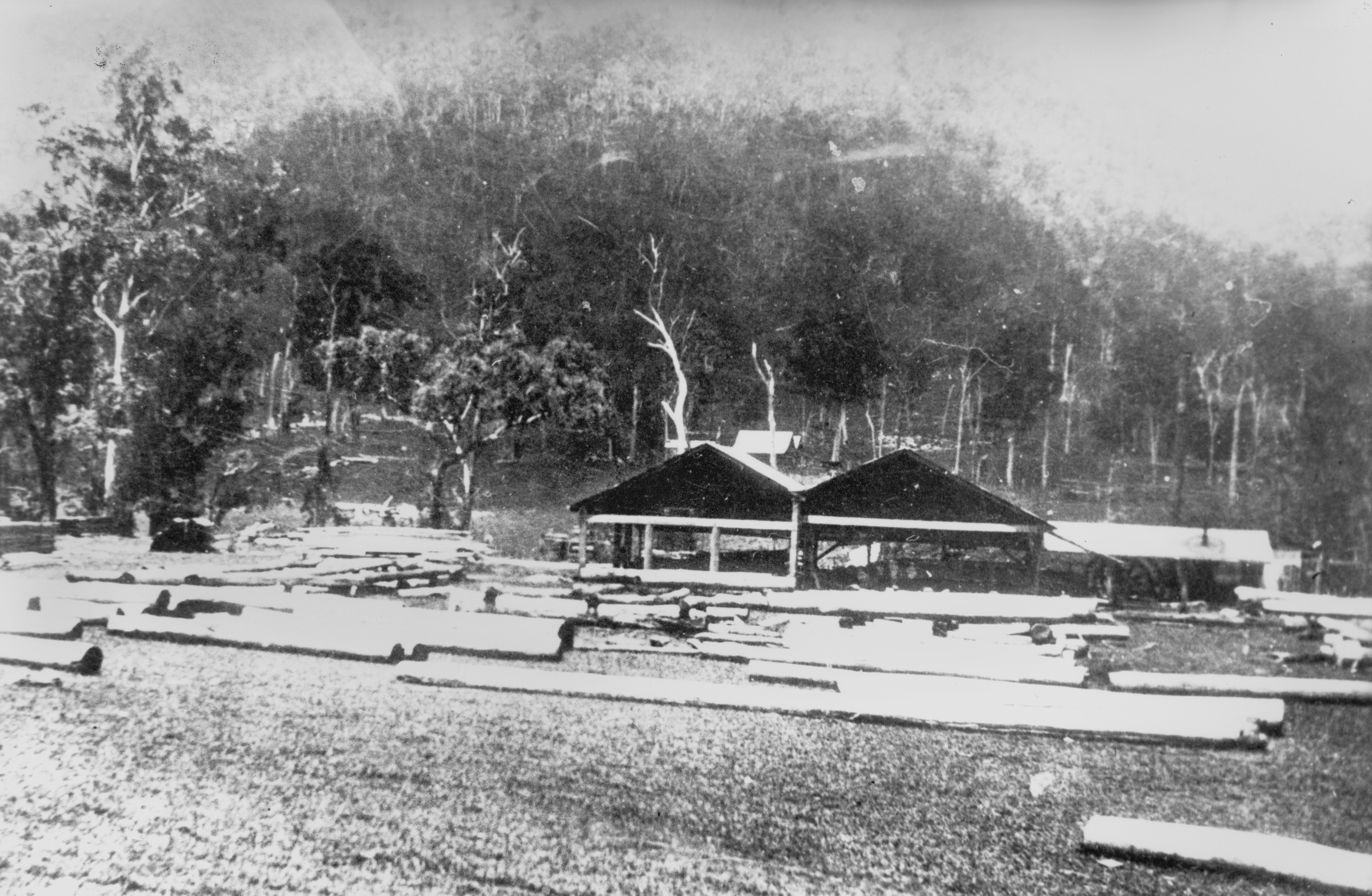
Mount Gipps Sawmill, ca. 1925

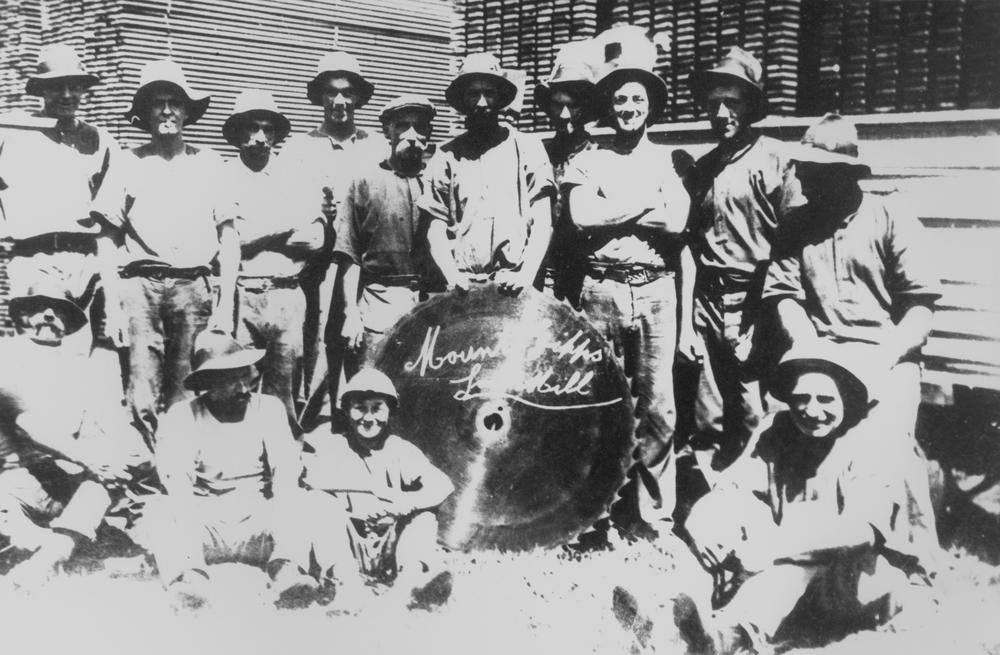
Workers from the Mount Gipps Sawmill, ca. 1925

In 1900, much of the land in the upper reaches of Running Creek was part of the rural property Telemon Crossing owned by A. Drynan.

There was a sawmill in Mount Gipps from at least 1920. It was located in the valley.

Mount Gipps State School was opened on 21 July 1920. It closed on 30 June 1954. It was at 220 Mount Gipps Road (28.3220°S 152.9915°E).

== Demographics ==
In the 2016 census, Mount Gipps had a population of 7 people. The locality contains 8 households, in which 30.0% of the population are males and 70.0% of the population are females with a median age of 52, 14 years above the national average. The average weekly household income is $0, $1,438 below the national average.

In the 2021 census, Mount Gipps had "no people or a very low population".

== Education ==
There are no schools in Mount Gibbs. The nearest government primary school is Hillview State School in Hillview to the north. The nearest government secondary school is Beaudesert State High School in Beaudesert further north.
