= Mount Barney, Queensland =

Mount Barney
- Suburb
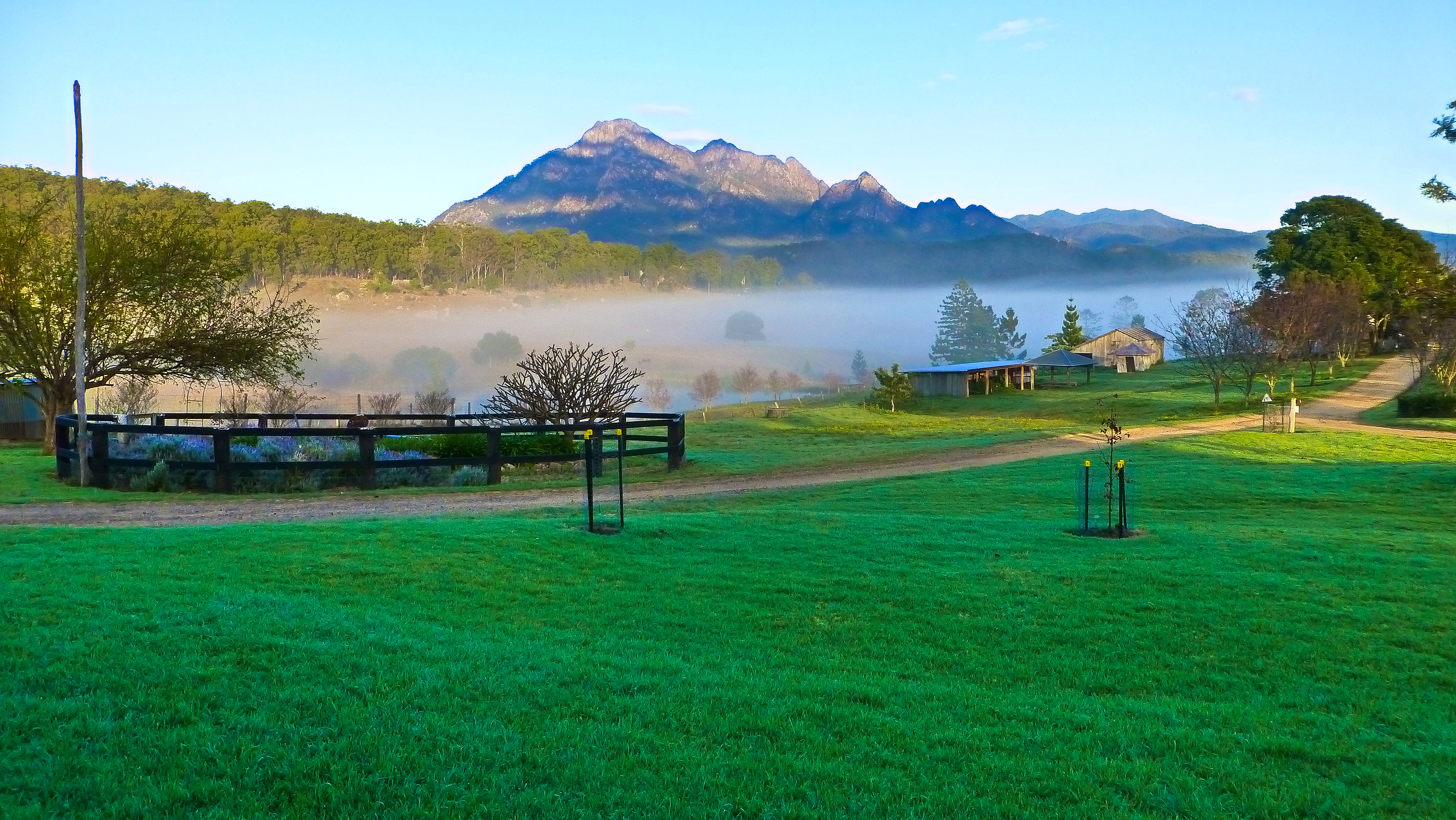
- Looking across the farmland to Mount Barney, 2013

- Interactive map of Mount Barney
- Coordinates: 28.2777°S 152.7077°E
- Country: Australia
- State: Queensland
- LGA: Scenic Rim Region
- Location: 17.9 km (11.1 mi) WSW of Rathdowney; 48.7 km (30.3 mi) S of Boonah; 49.2 km (30.6 mi) SW of Beaudesert; 119 km (74 mi) WSW of Brisbane

Government
  - State electorate: Scenic Rim
  - Federal division: Wright

Area
  - Total: 82.7 km^{2} (31.9 sq mi)

Population
  - Total: 46 (2021 census)
  - Density: 0.556/km^{2} (1.441/sq mi)
- Time zone: UTC+10:00 (AEST)
- Postcode: 4287
Suburbs around Mount Barney
| Maroon | Barney View | Barney View |
| Burnett Creek | Mount Barney | Palen Creek |
| Lindesay Creek | Dairy Flat | Mount Lindesay |

Mount Barney is a rural locality in the Scenic Rim Region, Queensland, Australia. In the 2021 census, Mount Barney had a population of 46 people. The locality is on the border with New South Wales.

== Geography ==
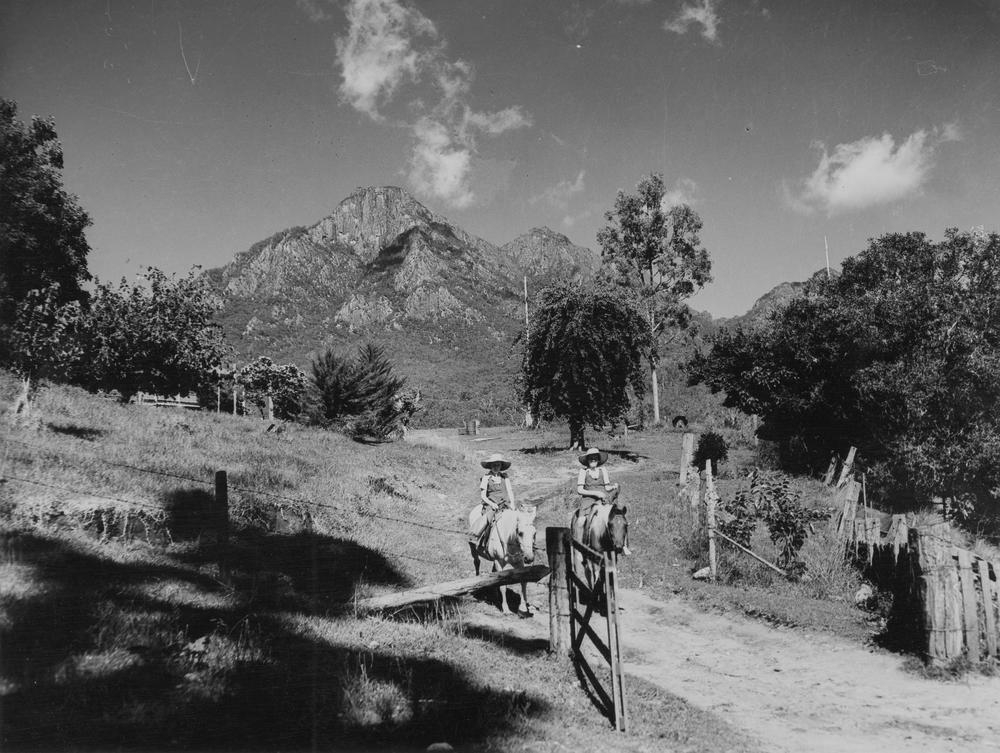
Track on farmland at the foot of Mount Barney, circa 1952

The locality takes its name from the mountain of the same name. The Mount Barney National Park occupies all of the south and west of the locality with other discontiguous sections of the national park in the north and east of the locality.

The Logan River rises in the south-west of the locality (28.32494°S 152.67771°E). It flows through the locality forming part of the south-eastern boundary and part of the north-eastern boundary, before exiting the locality to the north-east (Barney View).

Farm land lies in a valley of the Logan River in the eastern part of the locality which separates the mountain Mount Barney from Mount Gillies in the very east of the locality. The land use in the valley is predominantly grazing on native vegetation with some crop growing near the Logan River.

The locality has the following mountains (from north to south):

- Toms Tum (28.2615°S 152.6989°E) 718 metres (2,356 ft)
- North East Rock (28.2671°S 152.7005°E) 919 metres (3,015 ft)
- Bippoh Peak (28.2708°S 152.6839°E) 939 metres (3,081 ft)
- Leaning Peak (28.2726°S 152.6924°E) 1,138 metres (3,734 ft)
- North Pinnacle (28.2760°S 152.6960°E) 1,229 metres (4,032 ft)
- Barrabool (28.2784°S 152.6810°E) 1,149 metres (3,770 ft)
- Mount Barney (East) (East Peak) (28.2805°S 152.6982°E) 1,354 metres (4,442 ft)
- Mount Barney (West Peak) (28.2816°S 152.6865°E) 1,358 metres (4,455 ft)
- Yellow Pinch (28.2832°S 152.7264°E) 391 metres (1,283 ft)
- Gwyala Peak (28.2855°S 152.6633°E) 1,269 metres (4,163 ft)
- Burrajum Peak (28.2905°S 152.6752°E) 1,242 metres (4,075 ft)
- Mount Ernest (28.3145°S 152.7087°E) 964 metres (3,163 ft)

== History ==
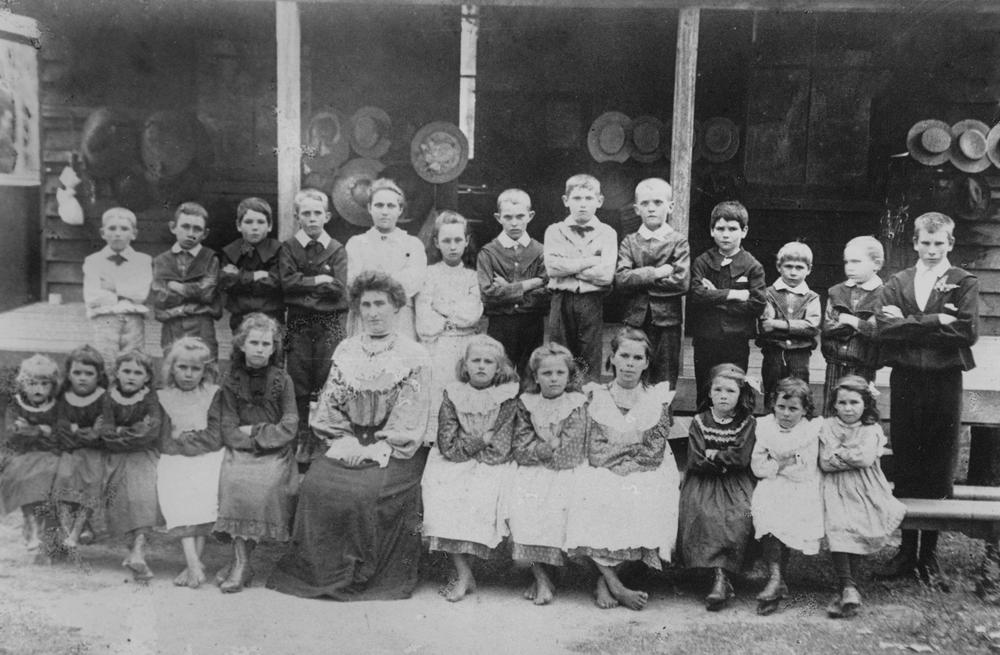
Mount Barney State School children with teacher Miss Bedelia Brennan, 1901

The Thulumbah Provisional School opened in 1901 and became Thulumbah State School on 1 January 1909. In 1916, it was renamed Mount Barney State School. The school closed in 1962. It was located on a bend in the Mount Barney Road (28.2412°S 152.7651°E).

== Demographics ==
In the 2016 census, Mount Barney had a population of 22 people. The locality contains 23 households, in which 50.0% of the population are males and 50.0% of the population are females with a median age of 31, 7 years below the national average. The average weekly household income is $0, $1,438 below the national average.

In the 2021 census, Mount Barney had a population of 46 people.

== Education ==
There are no schools in Mount Barney. The nearest government primary school is Rathdowney State School in Rathdowney to the north-east. The nearest government secondary school is Boonah State High School in Boonah to the north.
