= Chinghee Creek, Queensland =

Chinghee Creek
- Suburb
- Interactive map of Chinghee Creek
- Coordinates: 28.2847°S 152.9863°E
- Country: Australia
- State: Queensland
- LGA: Scenic Rim Region
- Location: 39.5 km (24.5 mi) S of Beaudesert; 109 km (68 mi) S of Brisbane

Government
  - State electorate: Scenic Rim
  - Federal division: Wright

Area
  - Total: 22.5 km^{2} (8.7 sq mi)

Population
  - Total: 35 (2021 census)
  - Density: 1.556/km^{2} (4.03/sq mi)
- Time zone: UTC+10:00 (AEST)
- Postcode: 4285
Suburbs around Chinghee Creek
Lamington	Lamington	Lamington
Running Creek	Chinghee Creek	Lamington
Running Creek	Mount Gipps	Mount Gipps

Chinghee Creek is a rural locality in the Scenic Rim Region, Queensland, Australia. In the 2021 census, Chinghee Creek had a population of 35 people.

== History ==
Chinghee Creek State School opened on 26 February 1912. It closed in December 1973. The school was at 495 Chinghee Creek Road (28.2808°S 152.9830°E).

== Demographics ==
In the 2016 census, Chinghee Creek had a population of 30 people. The locality contained 16 households, in which 48.5% of the population were males and 51.5% of the population were females with a median age of 43, 5 years above the national average. The average weekly household income was $1,292, $146 below the national average.

In the 2021 census, Chinghee Creek had a population of 35 people.

== Education ==
There are no schools in Chinghee Creek. The nearest government primary school is Hillview State School in Hillview. The nearest government secondary school is Beaudesert State High School in Beaudesert .
