= Southern Lamington, Queensland =

Southern Lamington
- Suburb
- Interactive map of Southern Lamington
- Coordinates: 28.2941°S 153.1300°E
- Country: Australia
- State: Queensland
- LGA: Scenic Rim Region
- Location: 49.2 km (30.6 mi) S of Beaudesert; 119 km (74 mi) S of Brisbane CBD

Government
  - State electorate: Scenic Rim
  - Federal division: Wright

Area
  - Total: 87.8 km^{2} (33.9 sq mi)

Population
  - Total: 0 (2021 census)
  - Density: 0.000/km^{2} (0.000/sq mi)
- Time zone: UTC+10:00 (AEST)
- Postcode: 4211
- Gazetted: 31 January 2003
Suburbs around Southern Lamington
| Darlington | O'Reilly | Limpinwood (NSW) |
| Lamington | Southern Lamington | Tyalgum Creek (NSW) |
| Mount Gipps | Cougal (NSW); Border Ranges (NSW) | Pumpenbil (NSW) |

Southern Lamington is a rural locality in the Scenic Rim Region, Queensland, Australia. It borders New South Wales. In the 2021 census, Southern Lamington had "no people or a very low population".

== Geography ==
The terrain is mountainous with numerous peaks including:

- Mount Razorback (1,052 metres (3,451 ft)) (28.2564°S 153.1272°E)
- Mount Widgee (964 metres (3,163 ft)) (28.2767°S 153.1106°E)
- Westray Mountain (887 metres (2,910 ft)) (28.2997°S 153.1119°E)

The locality is entirely within the Lamington National Park.

== History ==
The locality was officially named and bounded by Minister on 31 January 2003.

== Demographics ==
In the 2016 census, Southern Lamington had "no people or a very low population".

In the 2021 census, Southern Lamington had "no people or a very low population".

== Education ==
There are no schools in Southern Lamington. The nearest government schools are Hillview State School in neighbouring Hillview to the north-west and Darlington State School in neighbouring Darlington, also to the north-west. The nearest government secondary school is Beaudesert State High School in Beaudesert to the north. There are also Catholic primary and secondary schools in Beaudesert.
