= Mount Chinghee National Park =

National park in Queensland, Australia

- IUCN category II (national park)
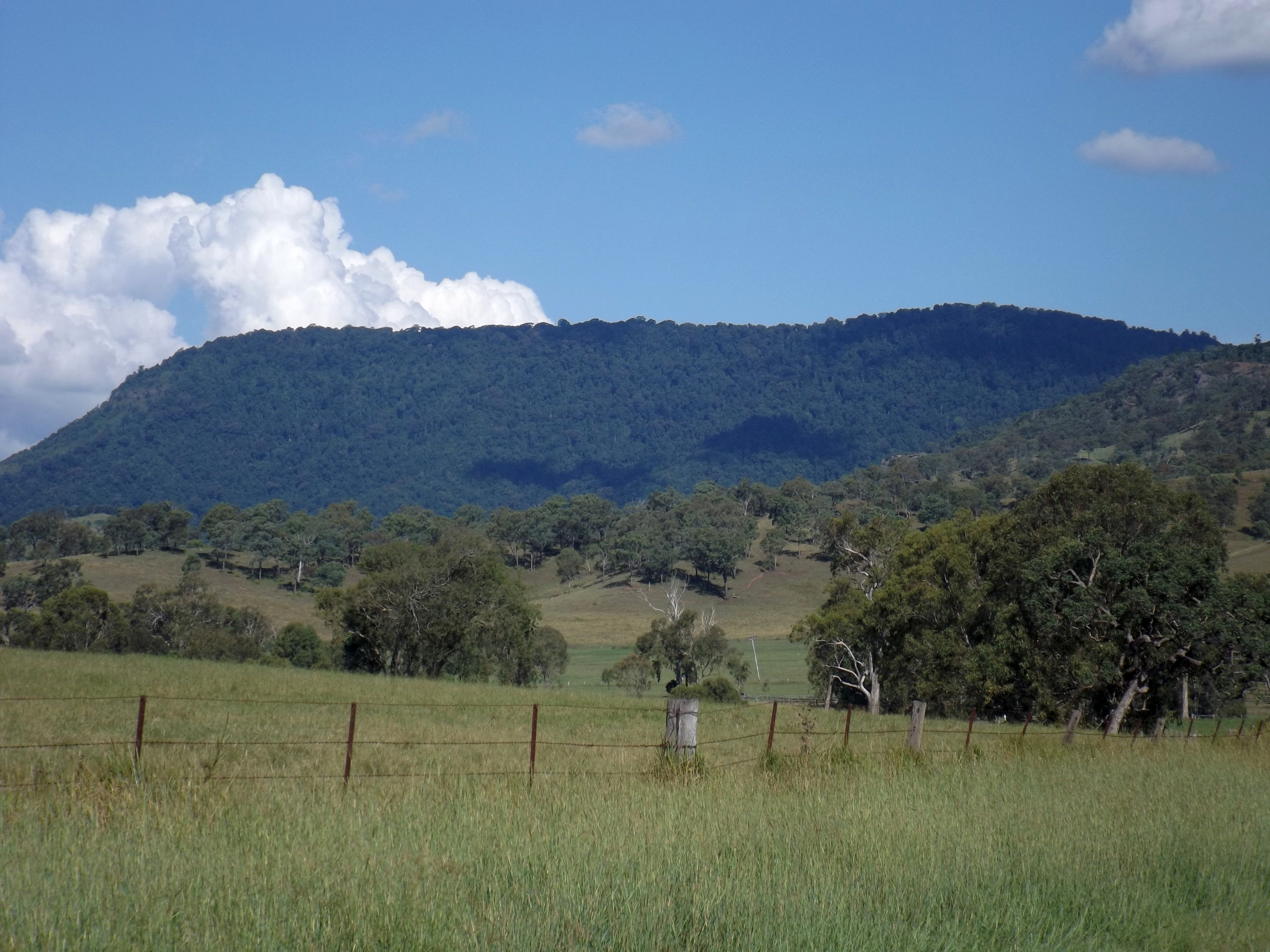
- Mount Chinghee, 2016

- Location within Queensland
- Location: Queensland
- Nearest city: Rathdowney
- Coordinates: 28°18′09″S 152°56′48″E
- Area: 12.6 km^{2} (4.9 sq mi)
- Established: 1994
- Governing body: NSW National Parks & Wildlife Service

Mount Chinghee is a national park in Queensland, Australia, 93 kilometres (58 mi) south of Brisbane. It is part of the Shield Volcano Group of the World Heritage Site Gondwana Rainforests of Australia inscribed in 1986 and added to the Australian National Heritage List in 2007. It is also part of the Scenic Rim Important Bird Area, identified as such by BirdLife International because of its importance in the conservation of several species of threatened birds.

It was initially called Telemon Environment Park until it was gazetted as Mount Chinghee National Park in 1994. The national park has no walking tracks or visitor facilities.

== See also ==
- Protected areas of Queensland
