= Teviot Falls =

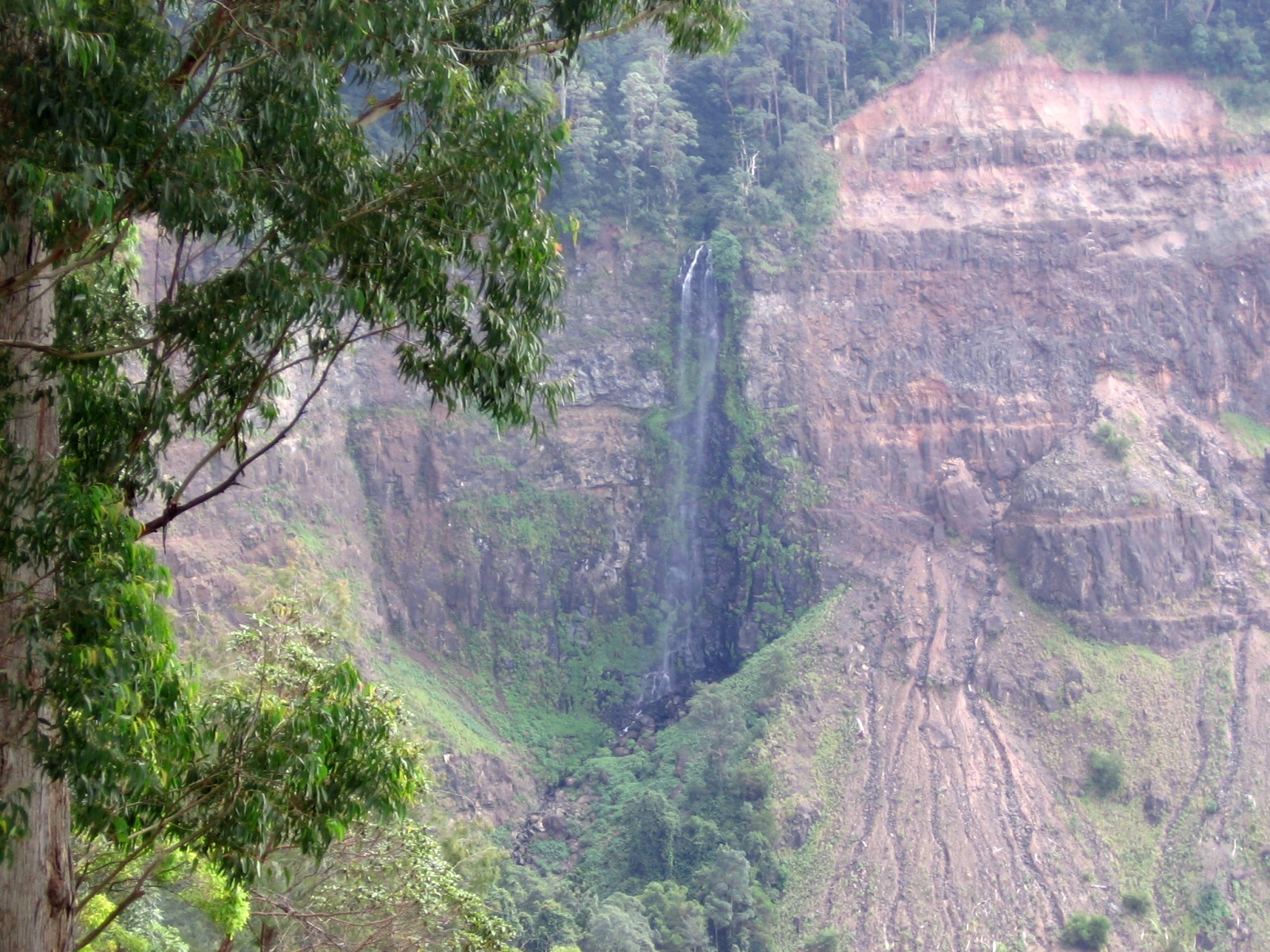
- Teviot Falls during drought conditions in 2006.

- Location within Queensland
- Location: Scenic Rim, Queensland, Australia
- Coordinates: 28.22769°S 152.48220°E
- Type: Plunge
- Total height: 80 metres (260 ft)
- Number of drops: 1
- Watercourse: Teviot Brook

The Teviot Falls is a plunge waterfall on Teviot Brook in Carneys Creek, Scenic Rim Region, Queensland, Australia.

== Location and features ==
External videos
- Flowing fast after heavy rain, 2012

The falls are part of the Scenic Rim and are located near the town of Killarney. The falls descend 80 metres (260 ft) from the McPherson Range near Wilsons Peak, north of the Queensland/New South Wales border. The falls may be viewed via accessing a sealed road up the range towards Teviot Gap, also known as The Head.

Four other waterfalls are located in the area surrounding Killarney, including the Queen Mary Falls, Daggs Falls, Browns Falls and Upper Browns Falls.

== Etymology ==
The naming of the falls is derived from the naming of Teviot Brook on 6 August 1828 by Allan Cunningham, a botanist and explorer, after the River Teviot, Roxburghshire, Scotland.

== See also ==
- List of waterfalls
- List of waterfalls in Australia
- Wyaralong Dam
