= Carneys Creek, Queensland =

Rural locality in Queensland, Australia

Carneys Creek
- Suburb
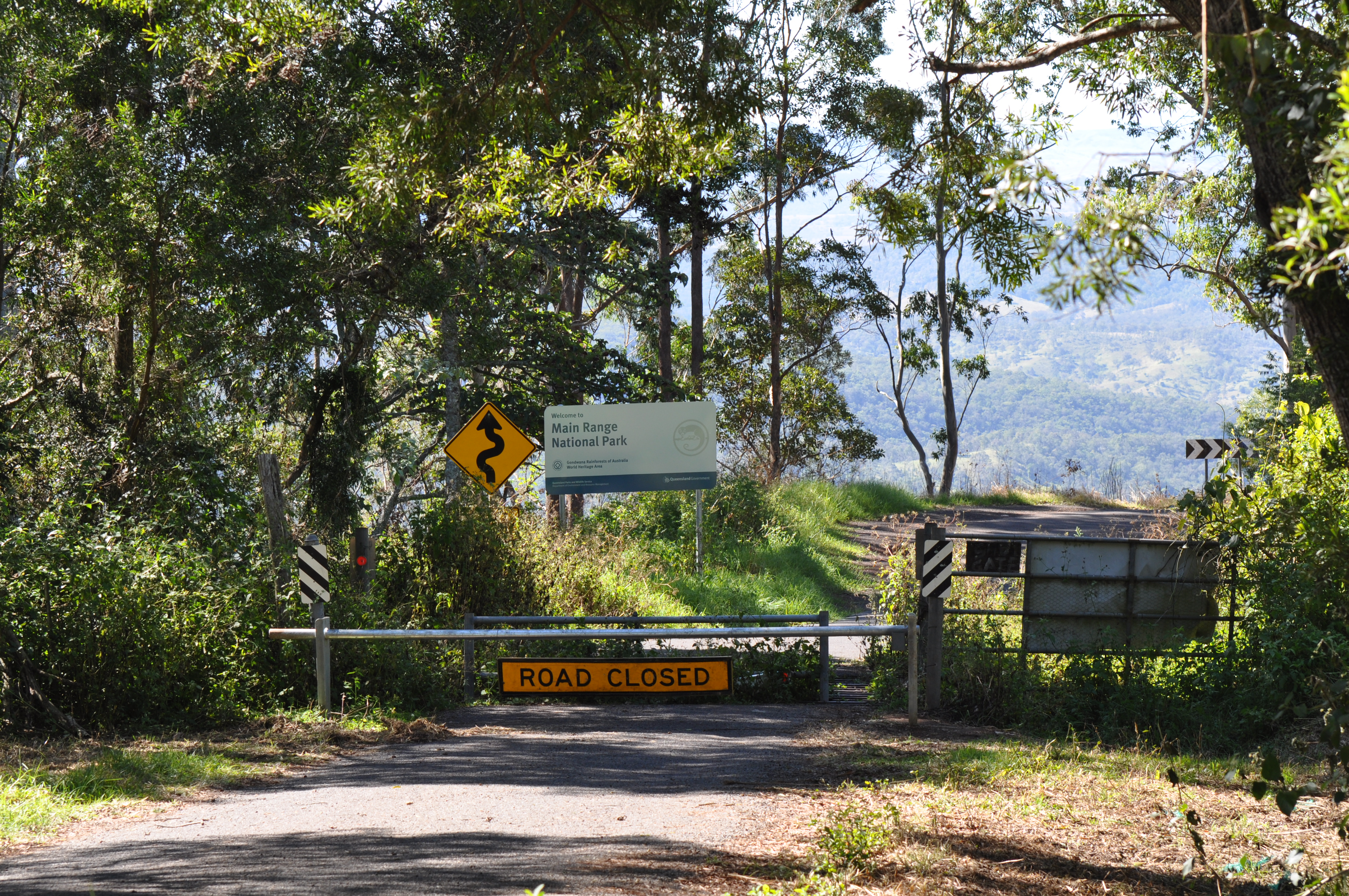
- Entrance to Main Range National Park

- Interactive map of Carneys Creek
- Coordinates: 28.2113°S 152.5350°E
- Country: Australia
- State: Queensland
- LGA: Scenic Rim Region
- Location: 28.8 km (17.9 mi) SW of Boonah; 43.0 km (26.7 mi) NE of Killarney; 68.2 km (42.4 mi) WSW of Beaudesert; 116 km (72 mi) SW of Brisbane

Government
  - State electorate: Scenic Rim
  - Federal division: Wright

Area
  - Total: 88.4 km^{2} (34.1 sq mi)

Population
  - Total: 71 (2021 census)
  - Density: 0.803/km^{2} (2.080/sq mi)
- Time zone: UTC+10:00 (AEST)
- Postcode: 4310
Suburbs around Carneys Creek
Emu Vale	Moogerah	Croftby
Mount Colliery	Carneys Creek	Burnett Creek
The Head	Koreelah (NSW)	Burnett Creek

Carneys Creek is a rural locality in the Scenic Rim Region, Queensland, Australia. It borders New South Wales. In the 2021 census, Carneys Creek had a population of 71 people.

== Geography ==
Teviot Brook rises in the south-west of the locality near Mount Superbus and then flows through the locality exiting to the north-east (Croftby). The watercourse Carneys Creek rises in the south of the locality and flows northward, becoming a tributary of Teviot Brook (28.1684°S 152.5562°E) in the north of the locality.

There are a number of mountains within the locality, including :

- Mount Bell (28.2128°S 152.4909°E) 1,079 metres (3,540 ft)
- Mount Roberts (28.2033°S 152.4724°E) 1,327 metres (4,354 ft)
- Mount Superbus (28.2183°S 152.4606°E) 1,372 metres (4,501 ft)
- Toowoonan Mount (28.1922°S 152.6103°E) 744 metres (2,441 ft)
- Wilsons Peak (Jirramun) (28.2531°S 152.4877°E) 1,229 metres (4,032 ft)

The south, south-west and west of the locality are within the Main Range National Park.

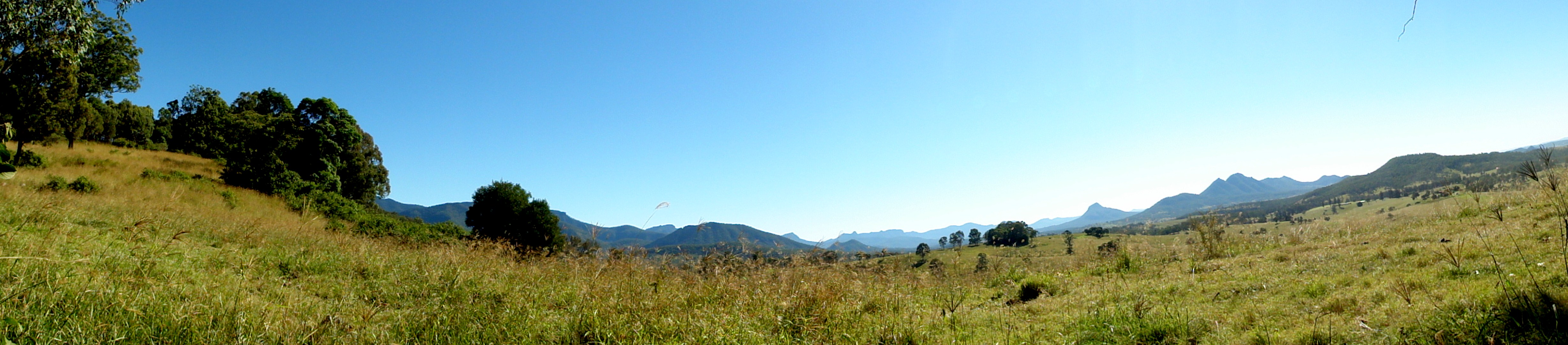
Carney's Creek Drive, 2013

Carneys Creek Road enters the locality from the north-east (Croftby) and then loosely follows the course of the watercourse Carneys Creek to the New South Wales border where it terminates. Head Road splits from Carneys Creek Road in the north of the locality and loosely follows the course of Teviot Brook to the south-west of the locality where it crosses the Great Dividing Range and exits to the south-west (The Head) where it becomes Spring Creek Road.

== History ==
The locality takes its name from the creek, which was named after Mr Carney (given name either Thomas or Patrick) who had an accommodation house by the creek circa 1865. It was on the road to the Tooloom Gold Diggings in New South Wales.

Carney's Creek Provisional School opened in 1890. On 1 January 1909 it became Carney's Creek State School. It closed in 1914 due to low student numbers. The school re-opened in 1920 but then closed again in 1921. It reopened in 1922. It closed permanently in 1970. It was located on Chalk Road (approx 28.2032°S 152.5584°E).

== Demographics ==
In the 2016 census, Carneys Creek had a population of 51 people. The locality contained 25 households, in which 59.1% of the population were males and 40.9% of the population were females with a median age of 55, 17 years above the national average. The average weekly household income was $1,062, $376 below the national average.

In the 2021 census, Carneys Creek had a population of 71 people.

== Education ==
There are no schools in Carneys Creek. The nearest government primary schools are Mount Alford State School in Mount Alford to the north, Maroon State School in Maroon to the east, and Killarney State School in Killarney to the south-west. The nearest government secondary schools are Killarney State School (to Year 10 only) in Killarney to the south-west and Boonah State High School (to Year 12) in Boonah to the north-east.

== Attractions ==
Teviot Falls is a waterfall on Teviot Brook (28.22769°S 152.48220°E).
