= Daggs Falls =

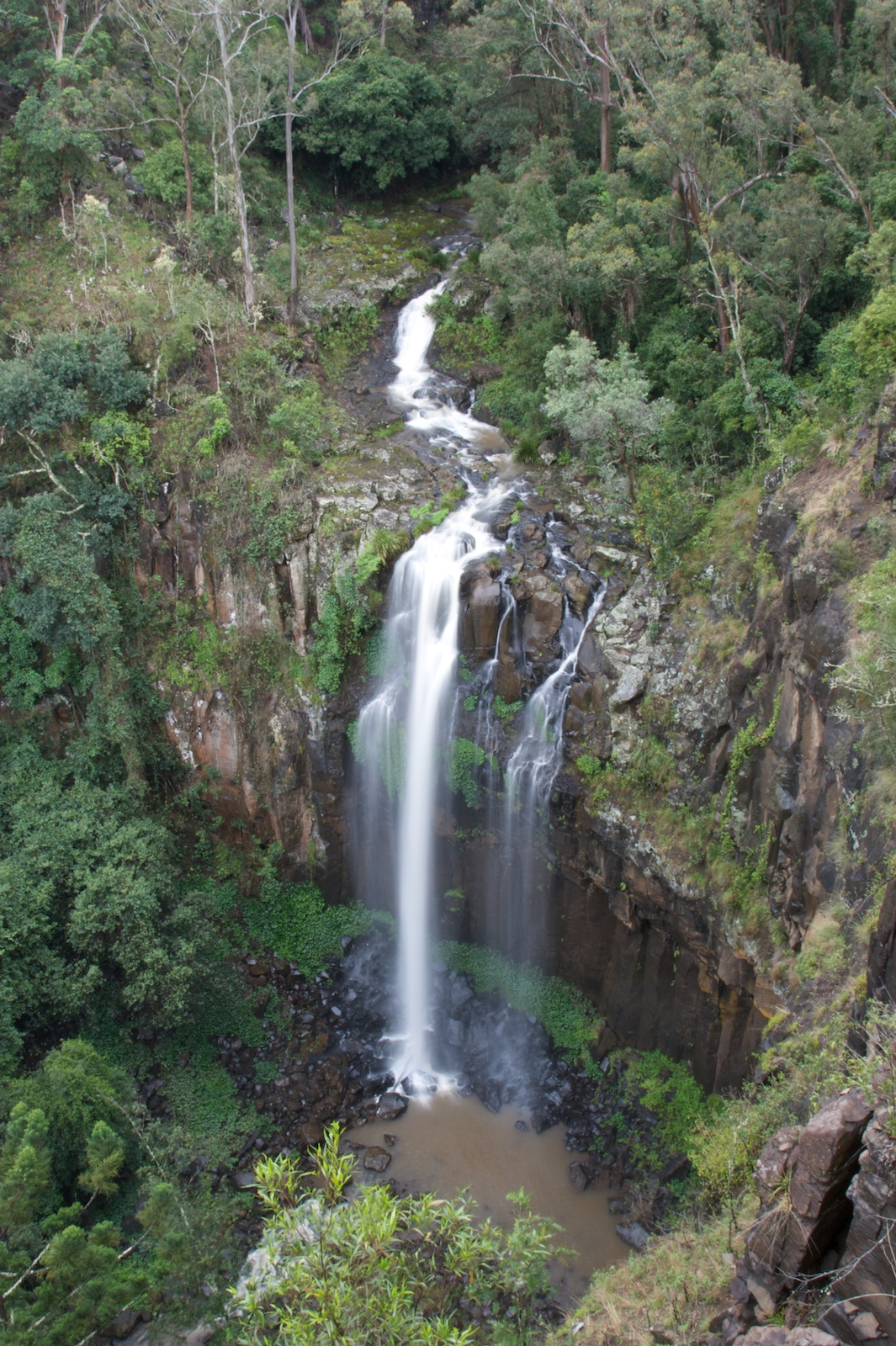

- Location within Queensland
- Location: Darling Downs, Queensland, Australia
- Coordinates: 28°20′43″S 152°20′50″E
- Type: Plunge
- Watercourse: Teviot Brook

The Daggs Falls is a plunge waterfall on Spring Creek that is located in the Darling Downs region of Queensland, Australia.

== Location and features ==
The falls are located east of the town of Killarney and descend from the McPherson Range, north of the Queensland/New South Wales border. The falls are situated directly on the roadside and there is a lookout provided.

Four other waterfalls are located in the area surrounding Killarney, including the Queen Mary Falls, Teviot Falls, Browns Falls and Upper Browns Falls.

== See also ==
- List of waterfalls
- List of waterfalls in Australia
