= Moogerah, Queensland =

Moogerah
- Suburb
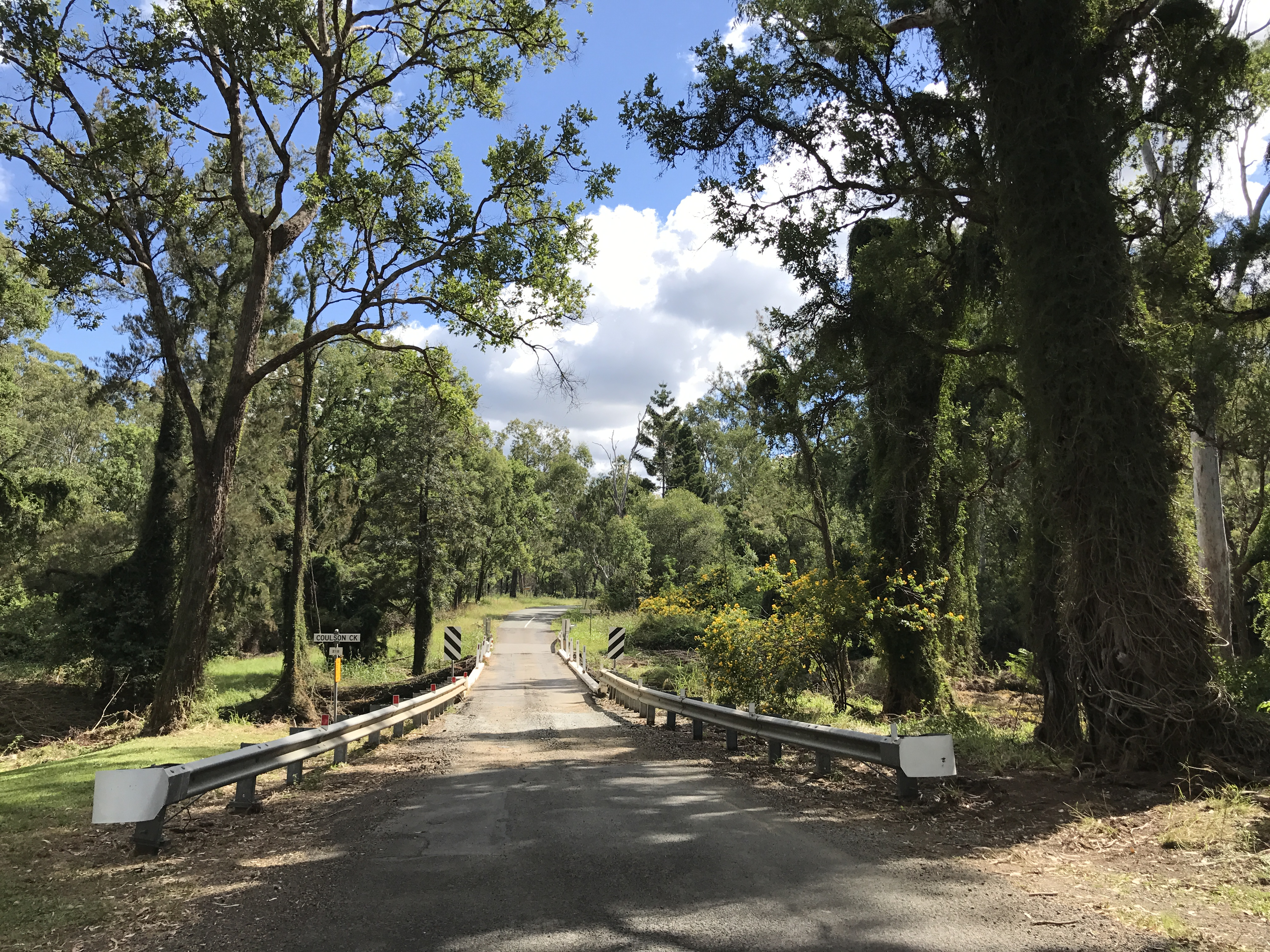
- Lake Moogerah Road bridge over Coulson Creek, 2017

- Interactive map of Moogerah
- Coordinates: 28.1097°S 152.5061°E
- Country: Australia
- State: Queensland
- LGA: Scenic Rim Region
- Location: 23.3 km (14.5 mi) SW of Boonah; 62.8 km (39.0 mi) WSW of Beaudesert; 65.2 km (40.5 mi) SW of Ipswich; 108 km (67 mi) SW of Brisbane

Government
  - State electorate: Scenic Rim
  - Federal division: Wright

Area
  - Total: 153.7 km^{2} (59.3 sq mi)

Population
  - Total: 242 (2021 census)
  - Density: 1.574/km^{2} (4.078/sq mi)
- Time zone: UTC+10:00 (AEST)
- Postcode: 4309
Suburbs around Moogerah
Clumber	Mount Edwards	Charlwood
Clumber	Moogerah	Mount Alford
Emu Vale	Carneys Creek	Croftby

Moogerah is a rural locality in the Scenic Rim Region, Queensland, Australia. In the 2021 census, Moogerah had a population of 242 people.

== Geography ==
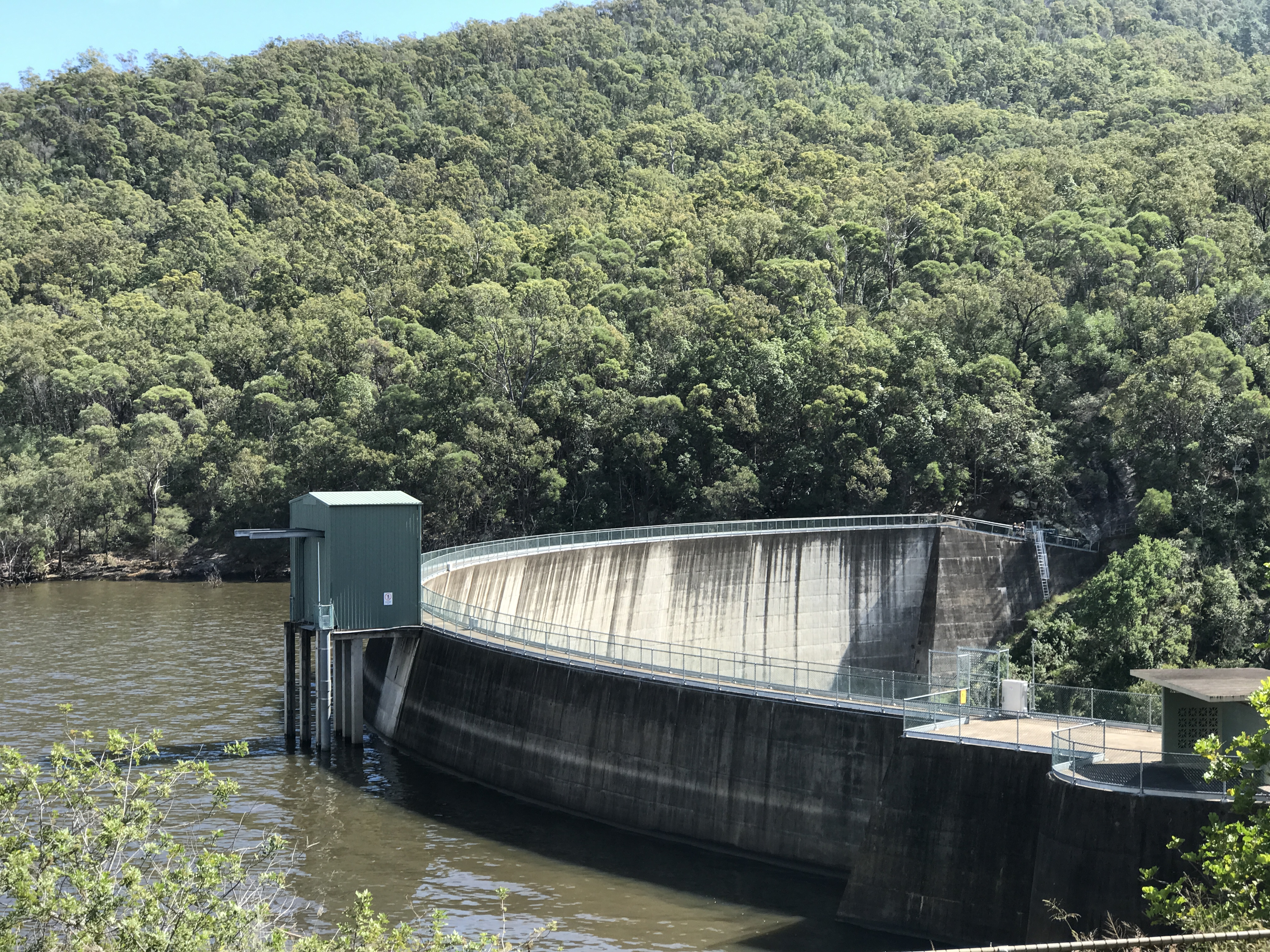
Moogerah Dam, 2017

The Moogerah Dam (28.0294°S 152.5497°E) and its reservoir, Lake Moogerah (28.05°S 152.5333°E) are located in the north of the locality. The lake is fed by Reynolds Creek.

Moogerah has the following mountains:

- Mount Alford (Teenaryvilla) (28.0815°S 152.5384°E) 521 metres (1,709 ft)
- Mount Asplenium (28.1563°S 152.4358°E) 1,292 metres (4,239 ft)
- Mount Greville (Meebalboogan) (28.0746°S 152.5028°E) 767 metres (2,516 ft)
- Mount Neilson (28.1598°S 152.4964°E) 596 metres (1,955 ft)
- Panorama Point (28.1603°S 152.4387°E) 1,255 metres (4,117 ft)
- The Bluff (28.0511°S 152.4975°E) 364 metres (1,194 ft)

== History ==
The name Moogerah was used by Yuggera people, meaning thunder.

In 1906, dairy farms of 81 to 261 acres (33 to 106 ha) were sold as the Moogera Paddock estate. The estate was centred around the confluence of Coulsen's and Reynold's Creek, land which is now under the Moogerah Dam. One of the advertised benefits of the estate was its proximity to the proposed Via Recta railway (a "straight" route from Brisbane to Sydney), which was never built.

Moogerah Provisional School opened on 4 August 1908. It became Moogerah State School on 1 January 1909. The school closed in 1962. It was at 1601 Lake Moogerah Road (28.0692°S 152.5321°E).

Construction of the Moogerah Dam commenced in 1959 and was completed in 1961. Moogerah Dam Provisional School opened on 24 August 1959. It closed on 28 August 1961 with the remaining students transferred to Engelsburg State School in Kalbar (later renamed Kalbar State School).

== Demographics ==
In the 2016 census, Moogerah had a population of 234 people. The locality contains 133 households, in which 47.8% of the population are males and 52.2% of the population are females with a median age of 50, 12 years above the national average. The average weekly household income is $945, $493 below the national average. 2.6% of Moogerah's population is either of Aborigional or Torres Strait Islander descent. 73.9% of the population aged 15 or over is either registered or de facto married, while 26.1% of the population is not married. 28.4% of the population is currently attending some form of a compulsory education. The most common nominated ancestries were Australian (28.8%), English (27.9%) and Irish (10.3%), while the most common country of birth was Australia (82.5%), and the most commonly spoken language at home was English (82.7%). The most common nominated religions were No religion (24.4%), Catholic (19.2%) and Not stated (16.2%). The most common occupation was a manager (28.9%) and the majority/plurality of residents worked 40 or more hours per week (52.4%).

In the 2021 census, Moogerah had a population of 242 people.

== Education ==
There are no schools in Moogerah. The nearest government primary schools are Mount Alford State School in neighbouring Mount Alford to the east and Aratula State School in Aratula to the north. The nearest government secondary schools are Boonah State High School (to Year 12) in Boonah to the north-east, Killarney State School (to Year 10) in Killarney to the south-west, and Warwick State High School (to Year 12) in Warwick in the west.

== Amenities ==
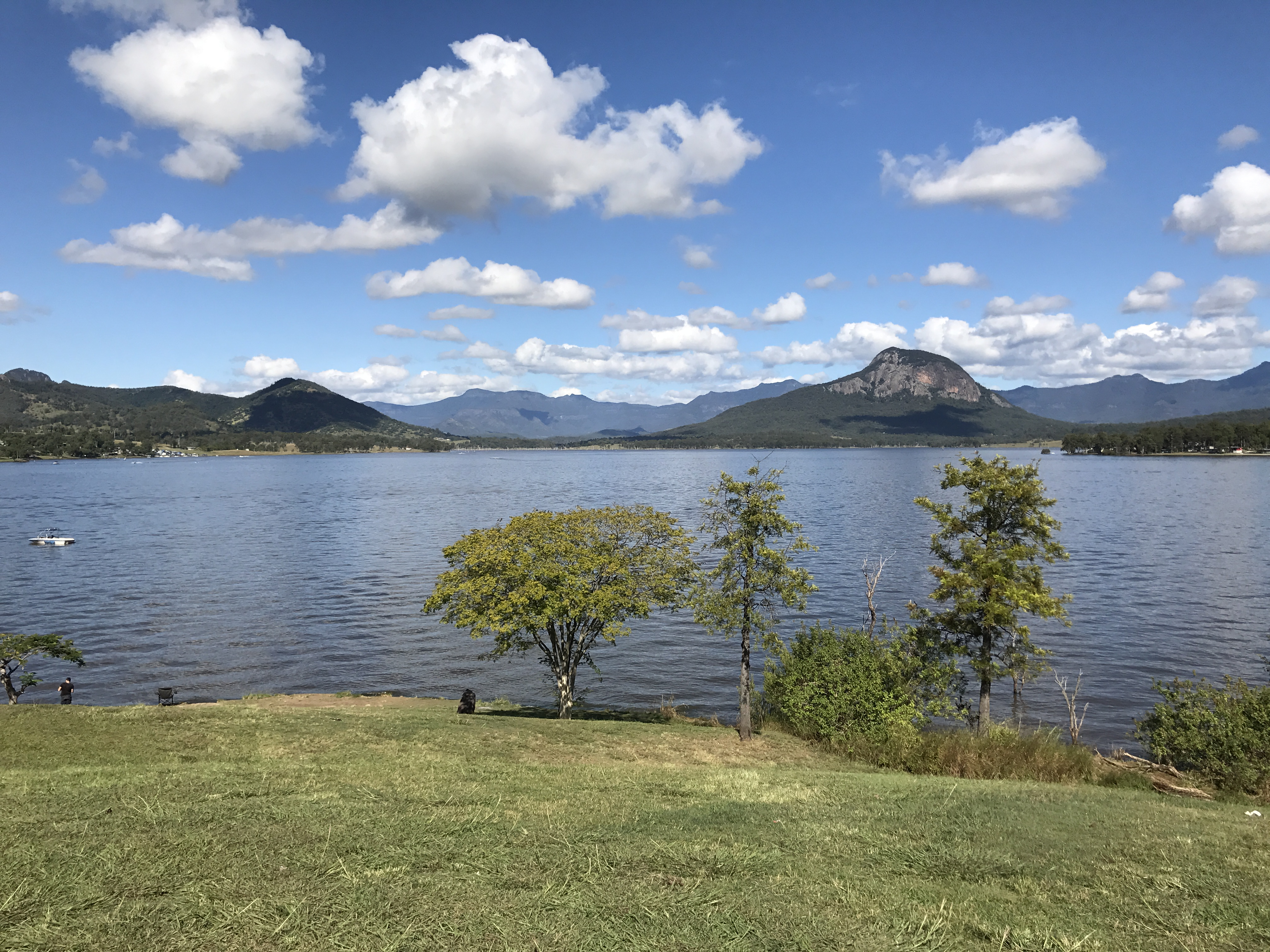
Lake Moogerah, 2017

There are a number of boat ramps into Moogerah Dam, all managed by the Scenic Rim Regional Council:

- Muller Park (Northern) boat ramp off Muller Park Road (28.0419°S 152.5512°E)
- Muller Park (South) boat ramp off Muller Park road (28.0462°S 152.5489°E)
- Moogerah Dam (Western) boat ramp off Ski Zone Road (28.0359°S 152.5407°E)
