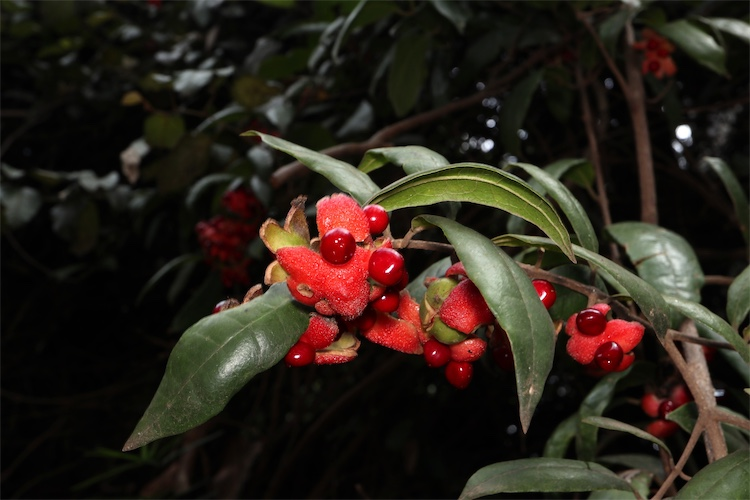
- In Tapin Tops National Park

Scientific classification
- Kingdom: Plantae
- Clade: Tracheophytes
- Clade: Angiosperms
- Clade: Magnoliids
- Order: Laurales
- Family: Monimiaceae
- Genus: Palmeria
- Species: P. racemosa

Binomial name
- Palmeria racemosa (Tul.) A.DC.

Synonyms
- Hedycarya racemosa Tul.

= Palmeria racemosa =

Species of flowering plant

Palmeria racemosa is a species of flowering plant in the family Monimiaceae and is endemic to eastern Australia. It is a woody vine with elliptic to oblong leaves and male and female flowers borne on separate plants, male flowers usually with thirty to forty stamens and female flowers with about ten carpels. The fruit is green, splitting to form a pinkish receptacle with 3 to 7 black or red drupes.

== Description ==
Palmeria racemosa is similar to Palmeria scandens, but has star-shaped hairs 0.3–1.1 mm (0.012–0.043 in) in diameter on the midrib, sometimes also on lateral veins – P. scandens has both simple and star-shaped hairs on the lower leaf surface.

== Taxonomy ==
This species was first formally described in 1855 by Edmond Tulasne who gave it the name Hedycarya racemosa in Annales des Sciences Naturelles. In 1868, Alphonse Pyramus de Candolle transferred the species to Palmeria as P. racemosa in Prodromus Systematis Naturalis Regni Vegetabilis. The specific epithet (racemosa) means "racemose".

Palmeria racemosa is listed as a synonym of Palmeria scandens in the Flora of Australia. However, P. racemosa was described nine years before P. scandens, so if the species are synonymous, the legitimate name for the species is P. racemosa.

== Distribution and habitat ==
Palmeria racemosa grows in rainforest and margins of rainforest between Kin Kin in south-east Queensland to Batemans Bay on the south coast of New South Wales.

== Conservation ==
This species is listed by the Queensland Department of Environment and Science as of "least concern".
