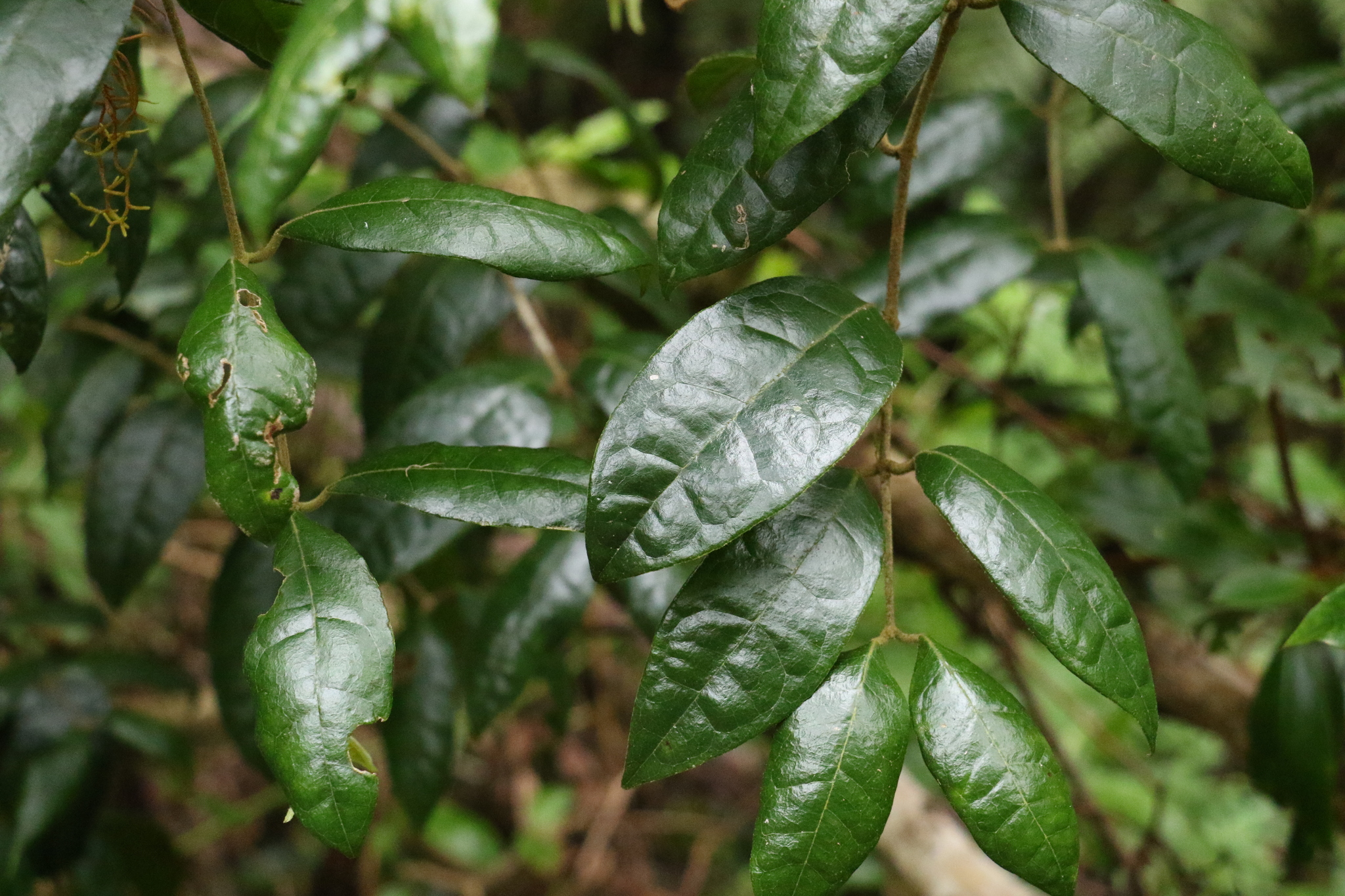
- Near Bilbrough Falls

Scientific classification
- Kingdom: Plantae
- Clade: Tracheophytes
- Clade: Angiosperms
- Clade: Magnoliids
- Order: Laurales
- Family: Monimiaceae
- Genus: Palmeria
- Species: P. foremanii

Binomial name
- Palmeria foremanii Wiffin

Synonyms
- Palmeria scandens var. hirsuta Domin

= Palmeria foremanii =

Species of flowering plant

Palmeria foremanii, commonly known as anchor vine, is a species of flowering plant in the family Monimiaceae and is endemic to an area near the New South Wales – Queensland border. It is a tall, woody climber or scrambling shrub with usually elliptic leaves, male and female flowers on separate plants with 5 tepals, male flowers with 40 to 43 stamens, female flowers with 7 to 12 carpels, and spherical, shiny black drupes.

== Description ==
Palmeria foremanii is a woody climber or scrambling shrub, its branchlets densely covered with star-shaped hairs. The leaves are usually elliptic, 30–115 mm (1.2–4.5 in) long and 15–50 mm (0.59–1.97 in) wide on a petiole 5–12 mm (0.20–0.47 in) long. The upper surface of the leaves is more or less glabrous and the lower surface is covered with golden-brown hairs. Male and female flowers are on separate plants and usually have 5 tepals. Male flowers are arranged in clusters of 7 to 13, 20–60 mm (0.79–2.36 in) long, each flower on a pedicel 4–6 mm (0.16–0.24 in) long, each with 40 to 43 stamens. Female flowers are arranged in clusters of 7 to 15, 20–75 mm (0.79–2.95 in) long, each flower on a pedicel 2–7 mm (0.079–0.276 in) long, each with 7 to 12 carpels. Flowering occurs from March to August and the fruit is a shiny black, more or less spherical drupe, 8–9 mm (0.31–0.35 in) in diameter.

== Taxonomy ==
Palmeria foremanii was first formally described in 2007 by Trevor Paul Whiffin in the Flora of Australia from specimens collected near The Head in 1978. The specific epithet (foremanii) was named in honour and remembrance of Donald Bruce Foreman.

== Distribution and habitat ==
This species grows in subtropical or remnant rainforest between Mount Glorious in Queensland and the Whian Whian State Forest in New South Wales.

== Conservation status ==
Palmeria foremanii is listed as of "least concern" under the Queensland Government Nature Conservation Act 1992.
