= McPherson Range =

Mountain range in New South Wales, Australia

McPherson
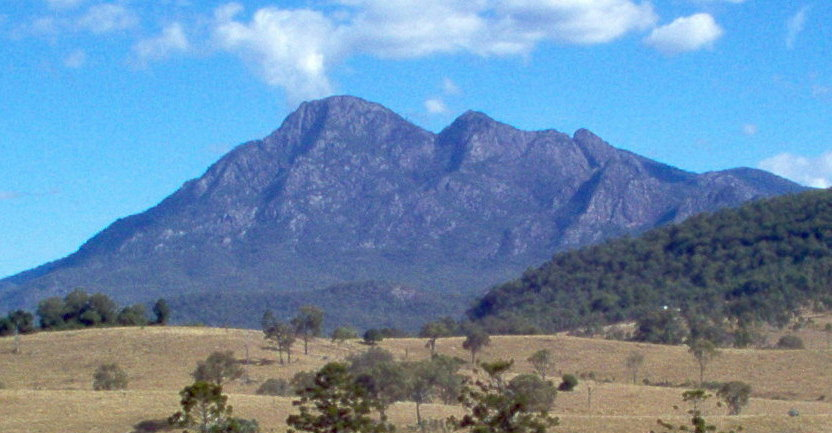
- Mount Barney, highest point of the range

Highest point
- Peak: Mount Barney
- Elevation: 1,359 m (4,459 ft)
- Coordinates: 28°17′S 152°42′E

Geography
- Location within New South Wales
- Country: Australia
- State(s): Queensland, New South Wales
- Region(s): South East Queensland, Northern Rivers
- Rivers: Condamine River
- Range coordinates: 28°20′S 153°00′E
- Parent range: Great Dividing Range
- Borders on: Teviot Range, Tweed Range, Border Ranges, Main Range

The McPherson Range is an extensive mountain range, a spur of the Great Dividing Range, heading in an easterly direction from near Wallangarra to the Pacific Ocean coastline. It forms part of the Scenic Rim on the border between the states of New South Wales and Queensland. Further west of the McPherson Range is the Main Range. Towards the coast the range continues into the Border Ranges and other mountainous terrain formed by the Tweed Volcano.

The Australian electoral Division of McPherson was named after the mountain range.

== Geography ==
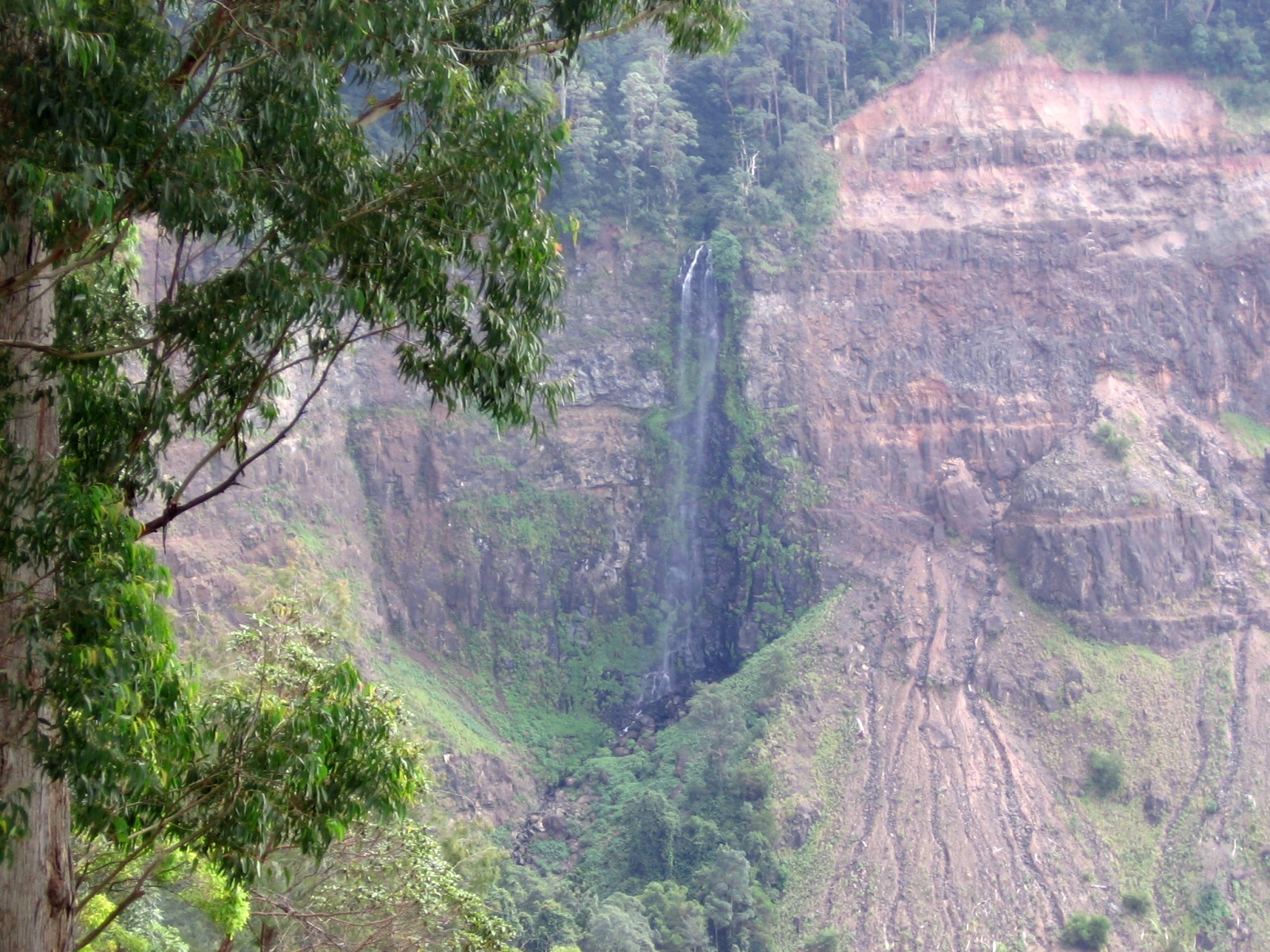
Teviot Falls at Carneys Creek

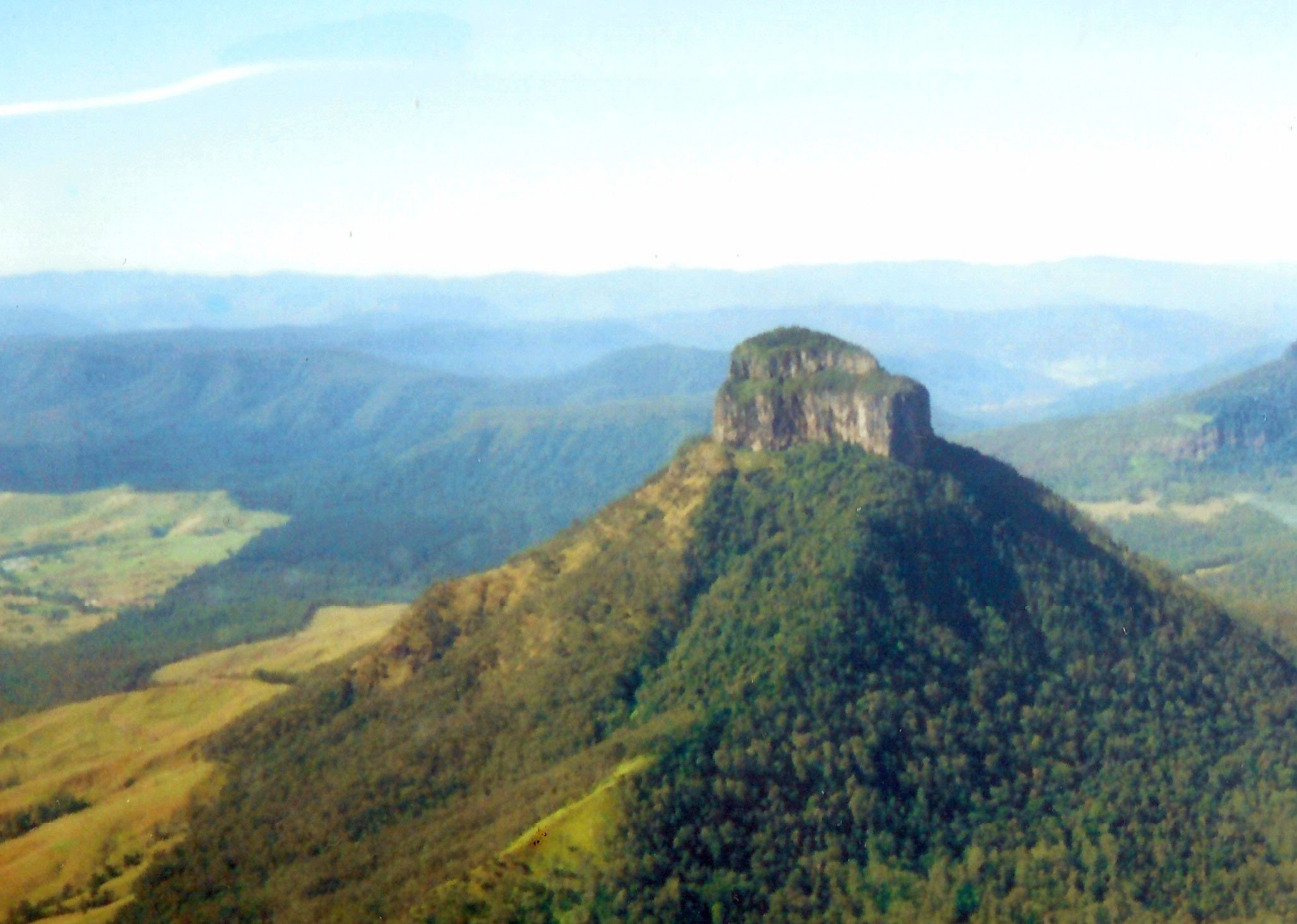
Mount Lindesay and Palen Creek

Wilsons Peak is considered to be the intersection of the Great Divide and the McPherson Range. There are five waterfalls in this part of the range including Teviot Falls, Queen Mary Falls, Daggs Falls and Browns Falls. Other notable mountains in the range include Mount Lindesay and Mount Barney.

The range contains a number of national parks, including Mount Barney National Park, Border Ranges National Park and Lamington National Park among others which possess World Heritage listing, as the Gondwana Rainforests of Australia.

The Sydney–Brisbane rail corridor and the Lions Road pass over the range at Richmond Gap, as does the Mount Lindesay Highway and the Nerang-Murwillumbah Road. A third passage through Teviot Gap, provides a road route between Boonah and Killarney near Wilson's Peak.

== History ==
The ranges were first explored by white settlers in 1828. The party was headed by Allan Cunningham and Patrick Logan while searching for a route to the Darling Downs from the newly established Moreton Bay penal colony. Logan had climbed Mount Barney thinking that he was on Mount Warning until he reached the summit and saw the true Mount Warning further south. Realising they were on another range they named it the McPherson Range after Major Duncan McPherson. Logan named Wilsons Peak and Mount Shadforth, which is now known as Mount Toowoonan.

The McPherson Range was the location of the 1937 Airlines of Australia Stinson crash, which went missing on a flight between Brisbane and Sydney in 1937. Bernard O'Reilly, a local farmer, trekked through thick forests and rugged terrain to discover the wreck and two emaciated, badly injured survivors, nine days after the crash.

== Flora and fauna ==
The sub-tropical rainforest on the range has never been damaged by severe bushfires (until the fires of 2019)and contains more than 20 species of rock and tree orchids.

The stream lily is a perennial plant found along creeks and gullies of the range. The extinct fern species Antrophyum austroqueenslandicum may still exist in unsurveyed parts of the range.

The unique Lamington spiny crayfish colours has evolved with white in New South Wales valleys and blue crayfish in Queensland's section of the range.

The rainforests contain important populations of the endangered rufous scrub-bird, and the vulnerable Albert's lyrebird, both of which are confined to south-east Queensland and north-east New South Wales.

== See also ==
- Gold Coast hinterland
- List of mountains in Australia
- Gold rush
