= Burnett Creek, Queensland =

Burnett Creek
- Suburb
- Interactive map of Burnett Creek
- Coordinates: 28.2636°S 152.5961°E
- Country: Australia
- State: Queensland
- LGA: Scenic Rim Region
- Location: 37.5 km (23.3 mi) SSW of Boonah; 68.5 km (42.6 mi) SW of Beaudesert; 85.9 km (53.4 mi) SSW of Ipswich CBD; 124 km (77 mi) SW of Brisbane CBD

Government
  - State electorate: Scenic Rim
  - Federal division: Wright

Area
  - Total: 119.4 km^{2} (46.1 sq mi)

Population
  - Total: 16 (2021 census)
  - Density: 0.134/km^{2} (0.347/sq mi)
- Time zone: UTC+10:00 (AEST)
- Postcode: 4310
Suburbs around Burnett Creek
Carneys Creek	Croftby	Maroon
Carneys Creek	Burnett Creek	Mount Barney
Koreelah (NSW)	Woodenbong (NSW)	Lindesday Creek (NSW)

Burnett Creek is a rural locality in the Scenic Rim Region, Queensland, Australia. It borders New South Wales to the south. In the 2021 census, Burnett Creek had a population of 16 people.

== Geography ==
The locality takes its name from the watercourse Burnett Creek which rises in the south of the locality (28.29731°S 152.59797°E) and flows toward the north-east corner of the locality when it flows into Lake Maroon (28.2011°S 152.6332°E), the reservoir created by the Maroon Dam, and beyond, eventually becoming a tributary of the Logan River in Rathdowney.

The terrain is mountainous with the following named peaks:

- Bald Knob (28.3069°S 152.5806°E) 778 metres (2,552 ft)
- Big Lonely Peak (28.2753°S 152.6280°E) 1,143 metres (3,750 ft)
- Double Peak (28.2584°S 152.6209°E) 1,250 metres (4,100 ft)
- Durramlee Peak (28.2528°S 152.6270°E) 1,189 metres (3,901 ft)
- Focal Peak (28.2618°S 152.6349°E) 1,051 metres (3,448 ft)
- Minnages Mount (28.2650°S 152.5993°E) 1,013 metres (3,323 ft)
- Montserrat Lookout (28.2605°S 152.6483°E) 1,013 metres (3,323 ft)
- Mount Ballow (28.2695°S 152.6143°E) 1,313 metres (4,308 ft)
- Mount Clunie (28.3066°S 152.5262°E) 1,155 metres (3,789 ft)
- Mount Philip (28.2391°S 152.6132°E) 718 metres (2,356 ft)
- Mowburra Peak (28.2502°S 152.6291°E) 1,157 metres (3,796 ft)
- Nothofagus Mountain (28.2826°S 152.6172°E) 1,285 metres (4,216 ft)
- Stags Head (28.3029°S 152.5391°E) 910 metres (2,990 ft)

Much of the south of the locality is within the Mount Barney National Park which extends into neighbouring Mount Barney and Maroon.

== History ==
Burnett Creek Provisional School opened on 13 May 1902. On 1 January 1909 it became Burnett Creek State School. It closed on 29 July 1921 due to low student numbers. The school was at 1418 Burnett Creek Road (28.2434°S 152.5856°E).

== Demographics ==
In the 2016 census, Burnett Creek had a population of 11 people. The locality contained 12 households, in which 75.0% of the population were males and 25.0% of the population were females with a median age of 55, 17 years above the national average. The average weekly household income was $687, $731 below the national average.

In the 2021 census, Burnett Creek had a population of 16 people.

== Education ==
There are no schools in Burnett Creek. The nearest government primary school is Maroon State School in neighbouring Maroon to the north-east. The nearest government secondary school in Boonah State High School in Boonah to the north.
