= Maroon Dam =

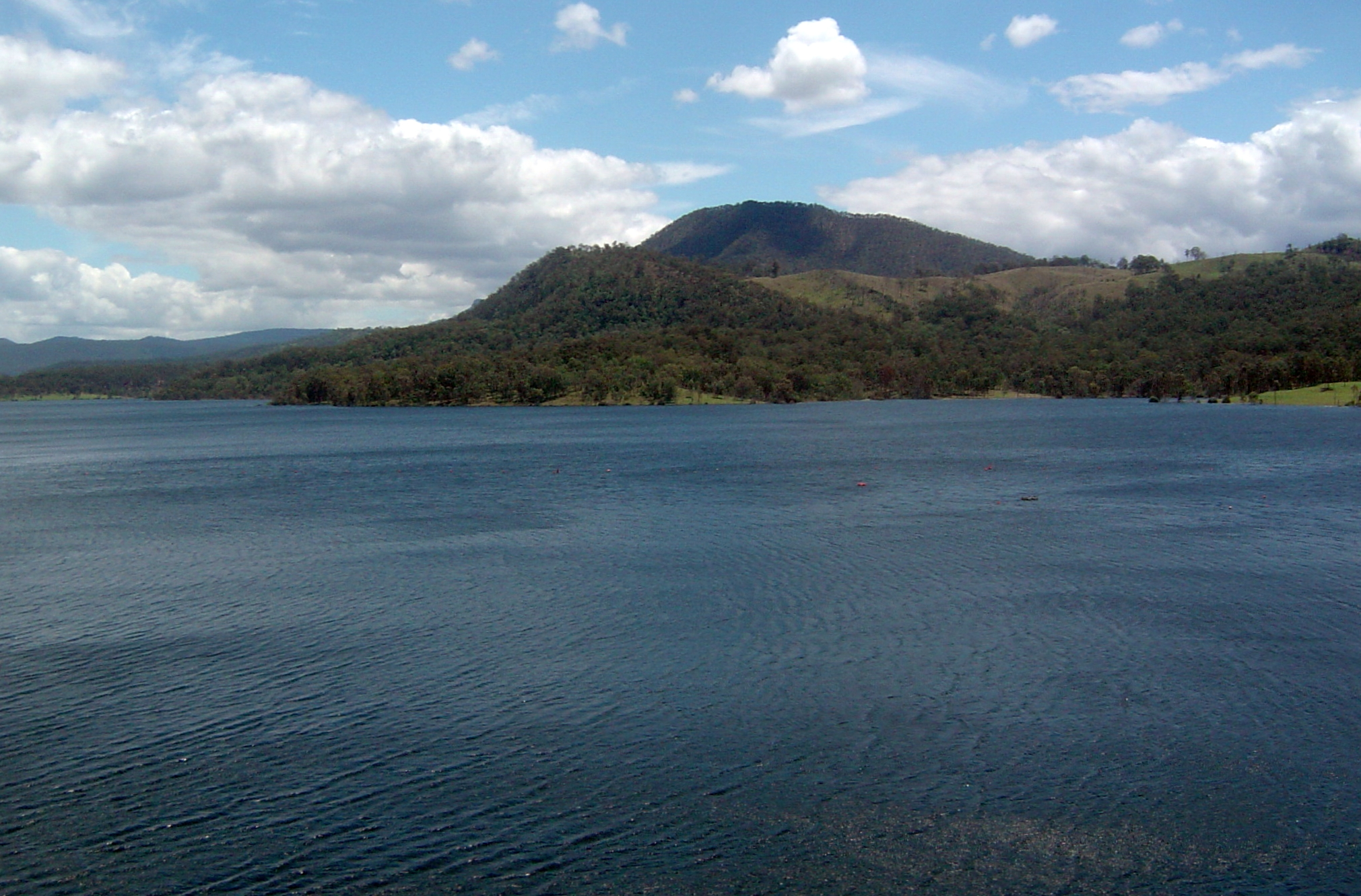
- View west across lake from the dam wall, 2010

- Location of the dam in Queensland
- Country: Australia
- Location: South East Queensland
- Coordinates: 28°10′51″S 152°39′25″E
- Purpose: Irrigation
- Status: Operational
- Construction began: 1969
- Opening date: 1973
- Operator: SEQ Water

Dam and spillways
- Type of dam: Embankment dam
- Impounds: Burnett Creek
- Height: 46.3 m (152 ft)
- Length: 451 m (1,480 ft)
- Dam volume: 1,620×10^{3} m^{3} (57×10^{6} cu ft)
- Spillway type: Uncontrolled
- Spillway capacity: 567 m^{3}/s (20,000 cu ft/s)

Reservoir
- Total capacity: 44,300 ML (35,900 acre⋅ft)
- Active capacity: 37,100 ML (30,100 acre⋅ft)
- Catchment area: 160 km^{2} (62 sq mi)
- Surface area: 310 ha (770 acres)
- Maximum water depth: 33.6 m (110 ft)
- Normal elevation: 217.5 m (714 ft) AHD
- Website seqwater.com.au

The Maroon Dam is a rock- and earth-filled embankment dam across the Burnett Creek, located in South East Queensland, Australia. The main purpose of the dam is for irrigation of the Scenic Rim Regional Council region. The impounded reservoir is also called Maroon Dam.

== Location and features ==
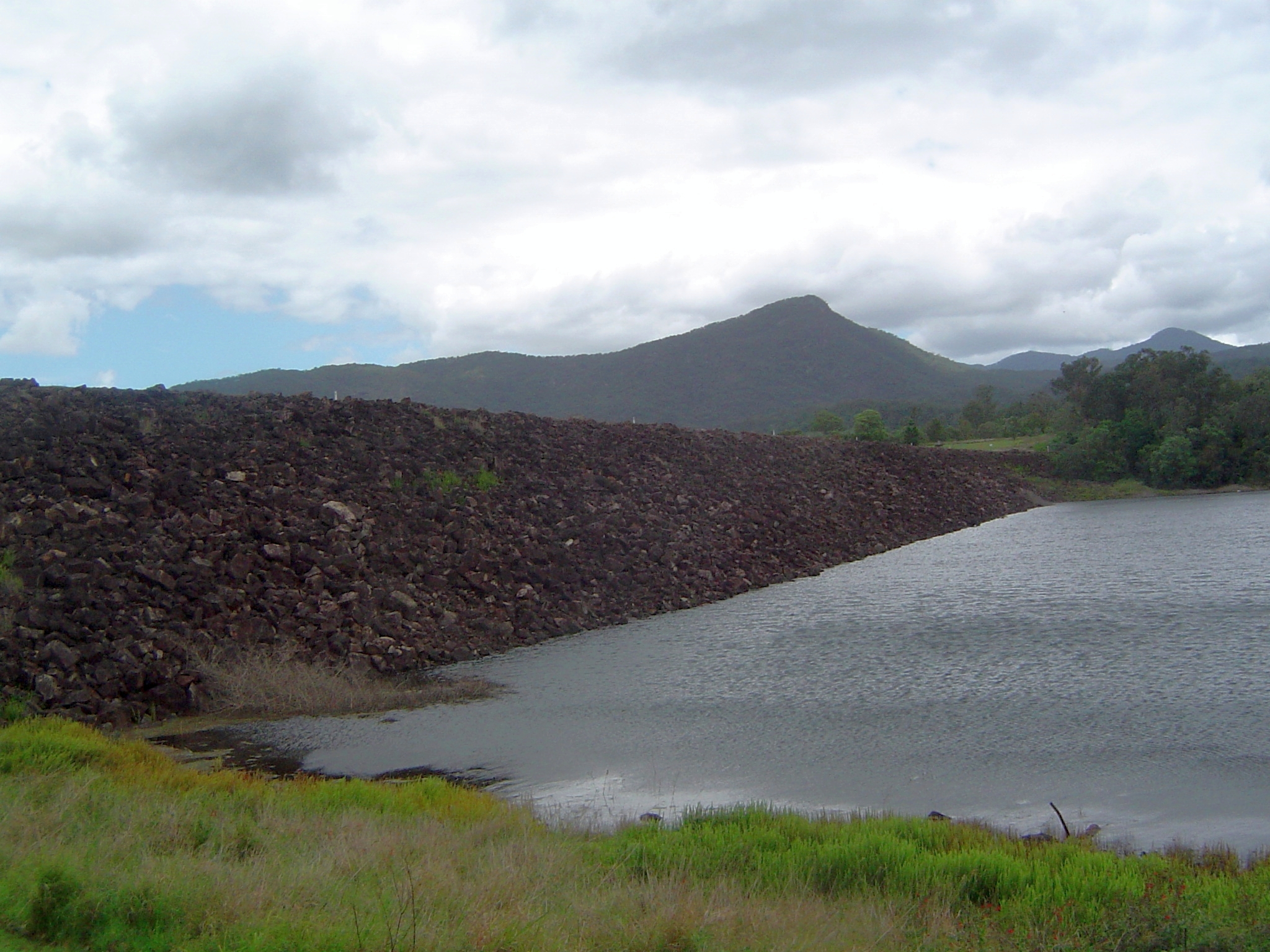
Dam wall and Mount May, 2010.

The dam is located 64 kilometres (40 mi) southwest of Beaudesert. The primary inflow of the reservoir is Burnett Creek, a tributary of Logan River.

Construction of the dam commenced in 1969 and was completed in 1973. The rock and earthfill dam structure is 46.3 metres (152 ft) high and 451 metres (1,480 ft) long. The resultant reservoir has the capacity of 44,300 megalitres (35,900 acre⋅ft) when full. The dam has a clearance of 10.4 metres (34 ft) above full supply level for flood mitigation purposes. This allows for a full operating level at 37,100 megalitres (8.2×10^{9} imp gal; 9.8×10^{9} US gal). From a catchment area of 160 square kilometres (62 sq mi) that lies within the Scenic Rim at the foot of the McPherson Range, the dam creates an unnamed reservoir, with a surface area of 310 hectares (770 acres). The uncontrolled un-gated spillway has a discharge capacity of 567 cubic metres per second (20,000 cu ft/s), and is situated 43.9 metres (144 ft) above the original stream bed. Initially managed by the SunWater, management of the dam was transferred to SEQ Water in July 2008.

The reservoir was officially opened on 16 July 1975 by Neville Hewitt, the Queensland Minister for Water Resources. The reservoir contains some areas of standing timber in its upper reaches. It is generally shallow with extensive weedbeds. Drought in February 2003 reduced water levels in the dam to 12%. It was at 18% capacity in November 2003.

== Recreation ==
Camping is not permitted on the dam's property. Private accommodation is available near the dam.

Fishing and water skiing are popular activities for visitors to the waters held back by the dam. There is a single concrete boat ramp and no restrictions on boat numbers.

The dam is stocked with silver perch, golden perch and bass. Additionally spangled perch are present. The Maroon Moogerah Fish Management Association is the local fish stocking group. A stocked impoundment permit is required to fish in the dam.

== See also ==
- List of dams in Queensland
