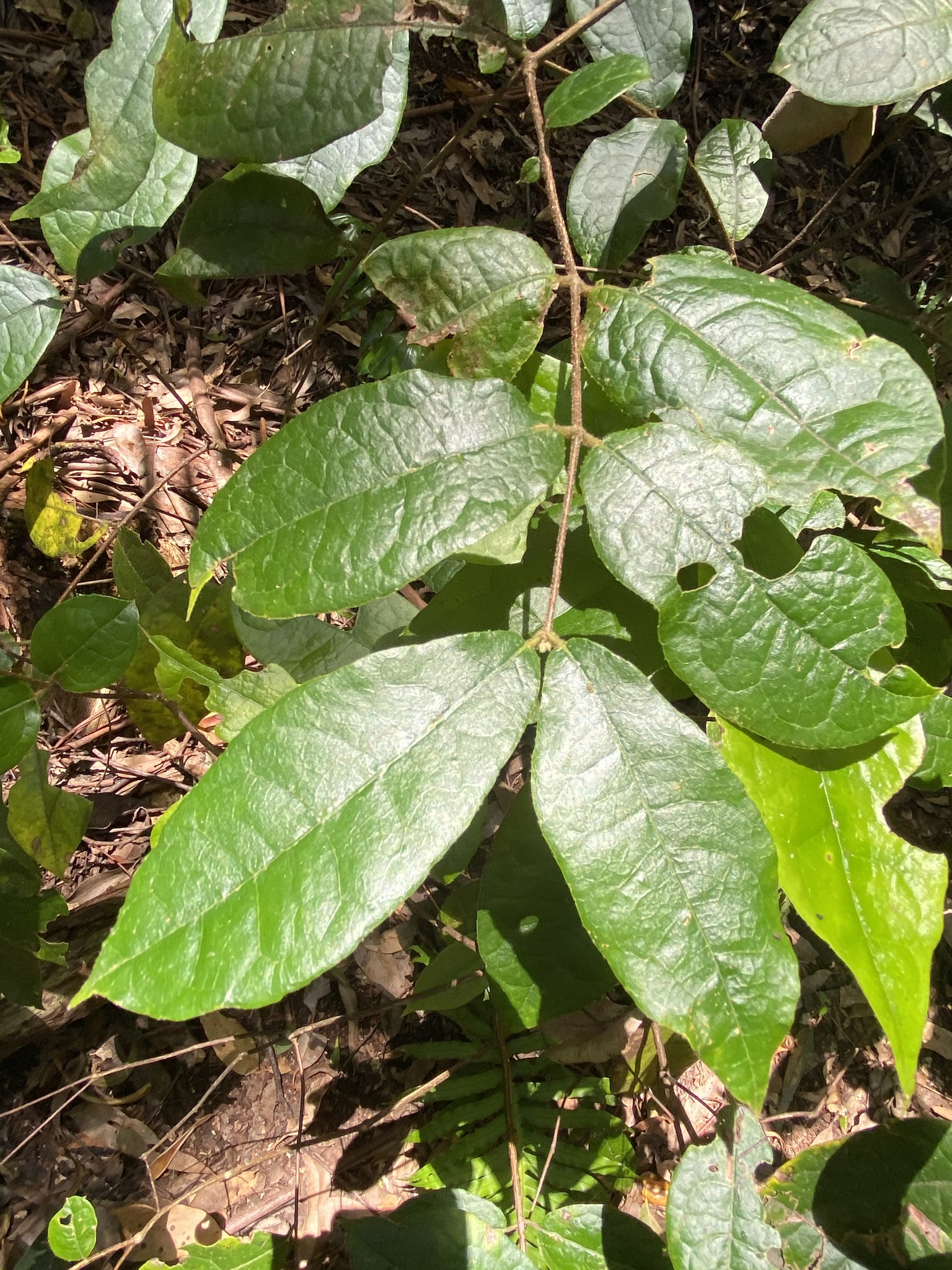
- Palmeria racemosa near Tamborine Mountain

Scientific classification
- Kingdom: Plantae
- Clade: Tracheophytes
- Clade: Angiosperms
- Clade: Magnoliids
- Order: Laurales
- Family: Monimiaceae
- Genus: Palmeria; F.Muell.

Type species
- Palmeria scandens F. Muell.

Synonyms
- Palmera T.Post & Kuntze orth. var.

= Palmeria (plant) =

Genus of flowering plants

Palmeria is a genus of about 17 species of flowering plants in the family Monimiaceae mostly native to Australia and New Guinea. One species (Palmeria arfakiana) is also native to Sulawesi and the Bismarck Archipelago. Plants in the genus Palmeria are woody climbers or climbing shrubs with usually 7 to 15 flowers, the flowers either male or female.

== Description ==
Plants in the genus Palmeria are dioecious woody climbers or climbing shrubs. Its leaves are sometimes have wavy edges, and are papery to thinly leather-like. The flowers are borne in racemes or panicles in leaf axils usually with 7 to 15 flowers (sometimes up to 40 flowers), covered with star-shaped hairs. Male flowers are cup-shaped to flattened hemispheres with 4 to 7 tepals and many stamens. Female flowers are spherical or urn-shaped with about 5 tepals usually with 5 to 10 carpels and a linear stigma. The perianth is fleshy, and splits to reveal a sessile drupe.

== Taxonomy ==
The genus Palmeria was first formally described in 1864 by Ferdinand von Mueller in his Fragmenta Phytographiae Australiae and the first species he described (the type species) was Palmeria scandens. The genus name (Palmeria) is in honor of Sir James F. Palmer.

=== Species list ===
The following species of Palmeria are accepted by Plants of the World Online as at April 2024:

- Palmeria angica Kaneh. & Hatus. New Guinea
- Palmeria arfakiana Becc. Sulawesi, New Guinea, Bismarck Archipelago
- Palmeria brassii Philipson New Guinea
- Palmeria clemensae Philipson New Guinea
- Palmeria coriacea C.T.White Queensland
- Palmeria foremanii Whiffin Queensland
- Palmeria gracilis Perkins New Guinea
- Palmeria hooglandii Philipson New Guinea
- Palmeria hypargyrea Perkins New Guinea
- Palmeria hypochrysea Perkins New Guinea
- Palmeria hypotephra (F.Muell.) Domin eastern Queensland
- Palmeria incana A.C.Sm. New Guinea
- Palmeria montana A.C.Sm. New Guinea
- Palmeria racemosa (Tul.) A.DC. Queensland, New South Wales
- Palmeria scandens F.Muell. New Guinea, Queensland, New South Wales
- Palmeria schoddei Philipson New Guinea
- Palmeria womersleyi Philipson New Guinea
