= The Head, Queensland =

The Head
- Suburb
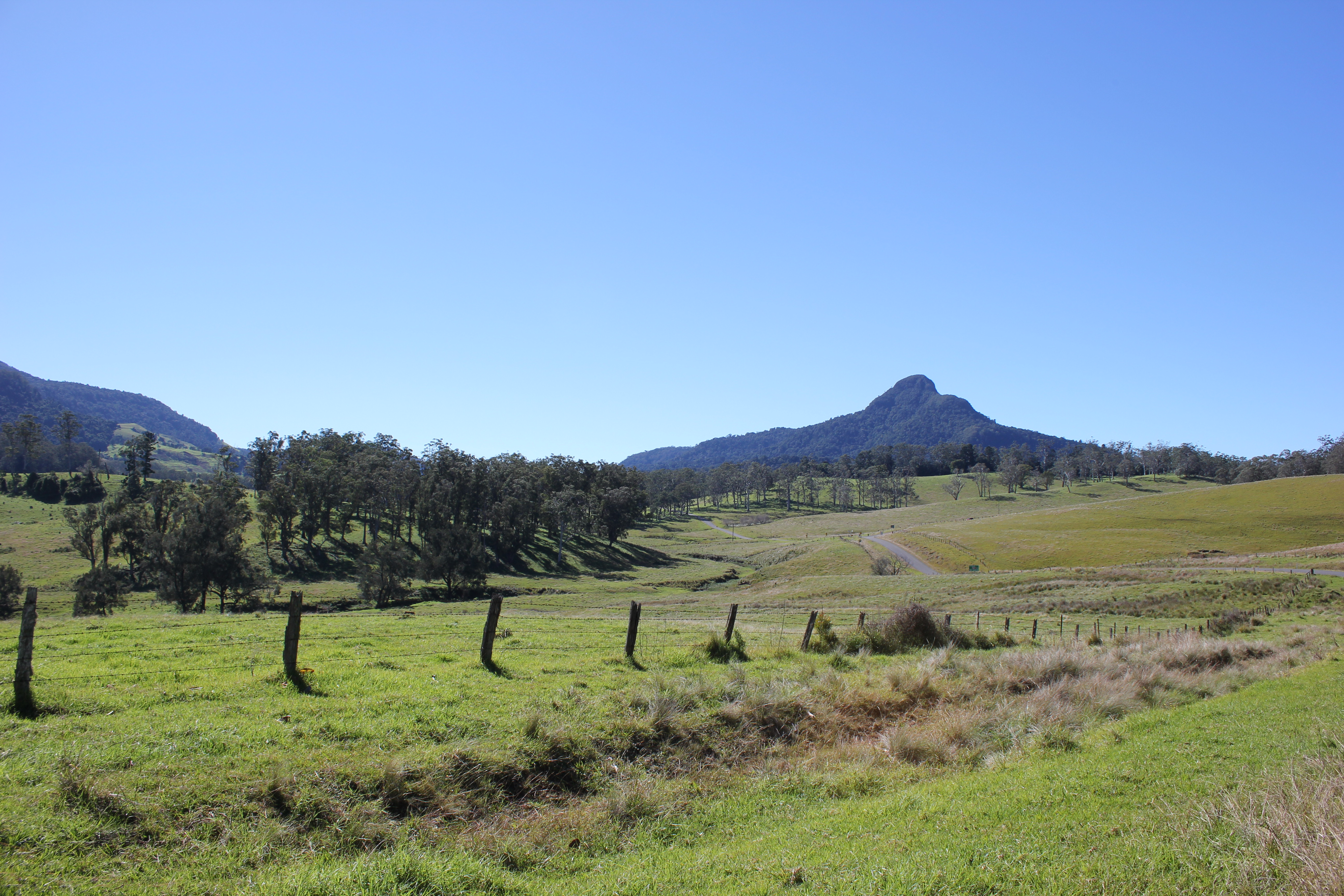
- Along Spring Creek Road, The Head, 2013

- Interactive map of The Head
- Coordinates: 28.2613°S 152.4436°E
- Country: Australia
- State: Queensland
- LGA: Southern Downs Region
- Location: 20.8 km (12.9 mi) NE of Killarney; 46.4 km (28.8 mi) SW of Boonah; 59.0 km (36.7 mi) E of Warwick; 134 km (83 mi) SW of Brisbane

Government
  - State electorate: Southern Downs
  - Federal divisions: Maranoa; Wright

Area
  - Total: 30.1 km^{2} (11.6 sq mi)

Population
  - Total: 12 (2021 census)
  - Density: 0.399/km^{2} (1.03/sq mi)
- Time zone: UTC+10:00 (AEST)
- Postcode: 4373
Suburbs around The Head
Mount Colliery	Mount Colliery	Carneys Creek
Mount Colliery	The Head	Koreelah (NSW)
The Falls	The Falls	Koreelah (NSW)

The Head is a rural locality in the Southern Downs Region, Queensland, Australia. It borders New South Wales. In the 2021 census, The Head had a population of 12 people.

== Geography ==
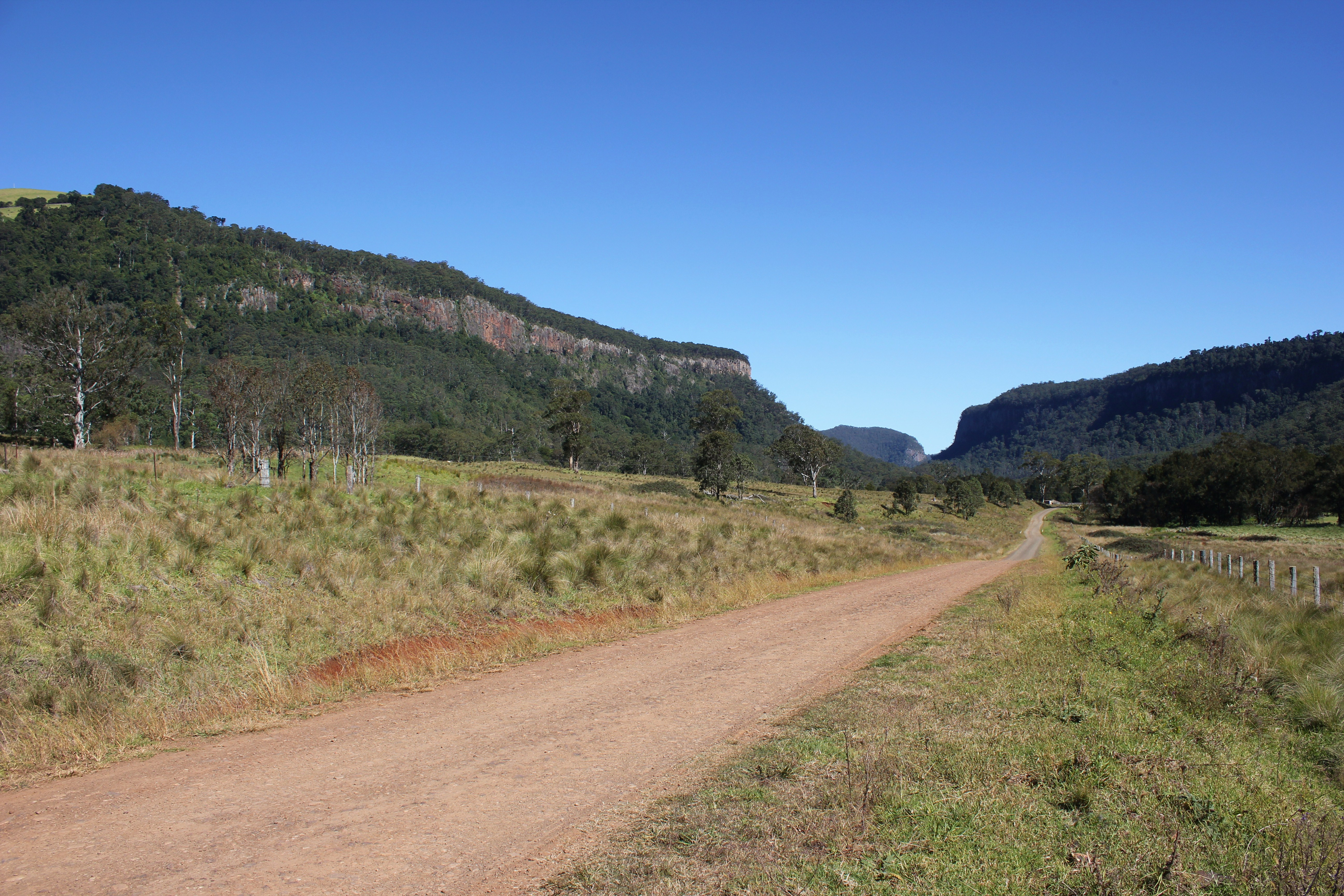
Looking towards the Great Dividing Range, 2013

The locality is loosely bounded by the Great Dividing Range to the north-east, east, and south-east. The south-east boundary is also the state border between Queensland and New South Wales.

The terrain is mountainous, ranging from 640 to 1,230 metres (2,100 to 4,040 ft) above sea level.

The Condamine River rises in the north-east of the locality (28.2388°S 152.4786°E) and flows through the locality exiting to the south-west (The Falls). This may be the origin of the name The Head.

Wilsons Peak is a neighbourhood within the locality (28.283°S 152.433°E). The mountain from which it takes its name is close to the boundary between The Head and Carneys Creek (28.2500°S 152.4833°E) and is 1,229 metres (4,032 ft) in height.

Part of the north-east of the locality is within the Main Range National Park. Apart from this protected area, the land use is a mixture of grazing on native vegetation and crop growing.

== History ==
The neighbourhood of Wilsons Peak is named after the mountain peak of the same name, which in turn was named by Captain Patrick Logan, commandant of the Moreton Bay penal colony, probably after Captain Wilson, the Director of Public Works in New South Wales. The peak's Indigenous name is Jirramun.

Wilson's Peak State School opened on 23 August 1909 and closed in 1944. It was located at 1966 Condamine River Road (28.2792°S 152.4391°E). The site is now used as short-term holiday accommodation.

== Demographics ==
In the 2016 census, The Head had a population of 7 people.

In the 2021 census, The Head had a population of 12 people.

== Education ==
There are no schools in The Head. The nearest government primary and secondary school (to Year 10) is Killarney State School in Killarney to the south-west. The nearest government secondary schools (to Year 12) are Warwick State High School in Warwick to the north-west and Boonah State High School in Boonah to the north-east.
