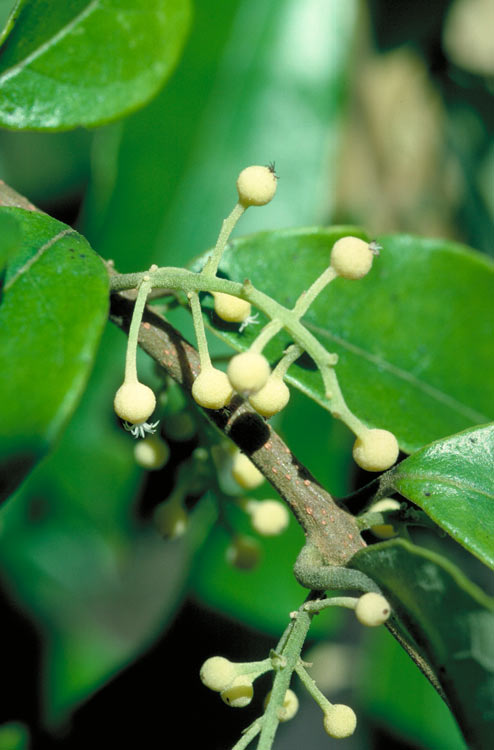
- Male flowers

Scientific classification
- Kingdom: Plantae
- Clade: Tracheophytes
- Clade: Angiosperms
- Clade: Magnoliids
- Order: Laurales
- Family: Monimiaceae
- Genus: Palmeria
- Species: P. hypotephra

Binomial name
- Palmeria hypotephra (F.Muell.) Domin

Synonyms
- Morinda hypotephra F.Muell.

= Palmeria hypotephra =

Species of plant

Palmeria hypotephra is a species of flowering plant in the family Monimiaceae and is endemic to Queensland. It is a woody climber with elliptic to egg-shaped leaves, male and female flowers on separate plants with 4 or 5 tepals, male flowers with 30 to 35 stamens, female flowers with 10 to 12 carpels, and spherical, dark brown to black drupes.

== Description ==
Palmeria hypotephra is a woody climber with stems up to 30 cm (12 in) in diameter, its branchlets covered with star-shaped hairs. The leaves are elliptic to egg-shaped, 60–110 mm (2.4–4.3 in) long and 25–55 mm (0.98–2.17 in) wide on a petiole 5–10 mm (0.20–0.39 in) long. The upper surface of the leaves is more or less glabrous and the lower surface is covered with felt-like white hairs. Male and female flowers are on separate plants and usually have 4 or 5 tepals. Male flowers are arranged in clusters of 13 to 36, 40–75 mm (1.6–3.0 in) long, each flower on a pedicel 7–10 mm (0.28–0.39 in) long, with 30 to 35 stamens. Female flowers are arranged in clusters of 9 to 15, 20–25 mm (0.79–0.98 in) long, each flower on a pedicel 3–7 mm (0.12–0.28 in) long, each with 10 to 12 carpels. Flowering occurs from May to October and the fruit is a dark brown to black, more or less spherical drupe, 5–6 mm (0.20–0.24 in) in diameter.

== Taxonomy ==
This species was first formally described in 1889 by Ferdinand von Mueller in The Victorian Naturalist, who gave it the name Morinda hypotephra from specimens collected on Mount Bellenden Ker, "at a height of about 5,000 ft (1,500 m)" by William A. Sayer. In 1913, Karel Domin transferred it to the genus Palmeria as P. hypotephra.

== Distribution and habitat ==
Palmeria hypotephra grows in rainforest, often near rainforest edges at altitudes, mainly between 80 and 1,550 m (260 and 5,090 ft) in north-eastern Queensland.
