= Croftby, Queensland =

Croftby
- Suburb
- Interactive map of Croftby
- Coordinates: 28.1494°S 152.5969°E
- Country: Australia
- State: Queensland
- LGA: Scenic Rim Region
- Location: 21.4 km (13.3 mi) SSW of Boonah; 60.9 km (37.8 mi) SW of Beaudesert; 69.8 km (43.4 mi) SSW of Ipswich; 109 km (68 mi) SW of Brisbane

Government
  - State electorate: Scenic Rim
  - Federal division: Wright

Area
  - Total: 75.9 km^{2} (29.3 sq mi)

Population
  - Total: 129 (2021 census)
  - Density: 1.700/km^{2} (4.402/sq mi)
- Time zone: UTC+10:00 (AEST)
- Postcode: 4310
Suburbs around Croftby
Mount Alford	Mount Alford	Coochin
Moogerah	Croftby	Coochin
Carneys Creek	Burnett Creek	Maroon

Croftby is a rural locality in the Scenic Rim Region, Queensland, Australia. The town of Teviot is within the locality (28.1383°S 152.5875°E). In the 2021 census, Croftby had a population of 129 people.

== Geography ==
Croftby has the following mountains:

- Mount Minto (also known as Coweemoorabung) in the north-west of the locality (28.1176°S 152.6067°E) rising to 331 metres (1,086 ft)
- Mount Moon (also known as Kibbobum) in the north-east of the locality (28.1144°S 152.5502°E) rising to 784 metres (2,572 ft)

Mount Minto is part of the Teviot Range which extends into the neighbouring localities of Moggerah and Mount Alford.

Teviot Brook enters the locality from the south-west (Carneys Creek) and exits to the north-east (Coochin).

Carneys Creek Road enters the locality from the south-west (Carneys Creek) just to the north of Teviot Brook and continues north of the creek until the road crosses the creek in the centre of the locality where the town of Teviot is located. The road then continues to the south of the creek until it exits to the north-east (Coochin).

As at 2020, there is little evidence of the town of Teviot.

== History ==
The locality was named Croftby by the Queensland Postmaster General after selector George Bycroft who occupied land in the area from 19 April 1877.

In 1888, there was a Crown land sale of 70 1-acre (0.40 ha) town lots, but only nine were sold for the upset price of £12 each. By 1890 buildings were being erected and land was reserved for a school and police station. The residents were agitating for the Dugandan railway line to be extended a further 13 miles (21 km) to Teviot, noting the extensive supply of cedar and other valuable timber as well as the increasing population.

St Andrew's Catholic Church was opened on Sunday 1 September 1907 at 683 Carneys Creek Road (28.1389°S 152.5873°E). As at 2021, the church building is still extant but is now in private ownership.

Teviot Provisional School opened on 14 September 1892. On 1 January 1909 it became Teviot State School. It was closed in 1918. It reopened on 11 June 1925 and closed finally in 1966. It was at the corner of Carneys Creek Road and Broad Gully Road (28.1415°S 152.6075°E).

== Demographics ==
In the 2016 census, Croftby had a population of 133 people. The locality contains 58 households, in which 51.1% of the population are males and 48.9% of the population are females with a median age of 53, 15 years above the national average. The average weekly household income is $1,125, $313 below the national average. 7.4% of Croftby's population is either of Aborigional or Torres Strait Islander descent. 67.1% of the population aged 15 or over is either registered or de facto married, while 32.9% of the population is not married. 23.1% of the population is currently attending some form of a compulsory education. The most common nominated ancestries were English (32.8%), Australian (25.3%) and Irish (10.8%), while the most common country of birth was Australia (77.0%), and the most commonly spoken language at home was English (84.4%). The most common nominated religions were Anglican (27.5%), No religion (22.1%) and Catholic (16.8%). The most common occupation was that of the manager (34.0%) and the majority/plurality of residents worked 40 or more hours per week (43.4%).

In the 2021 census, Croftby had a population of 129 people.

== Education ==
There are no schools in Croftby. The nearest government primary schools are Mount Alford State School in neighbouring Mount Alford to the north and Maroon State School in neighbouring Maroon to the east. The nearest government secondary school is Boonah State High School in Boonah to the north-east.
