= The Falls, Queensland =

The Falls
- Suburb
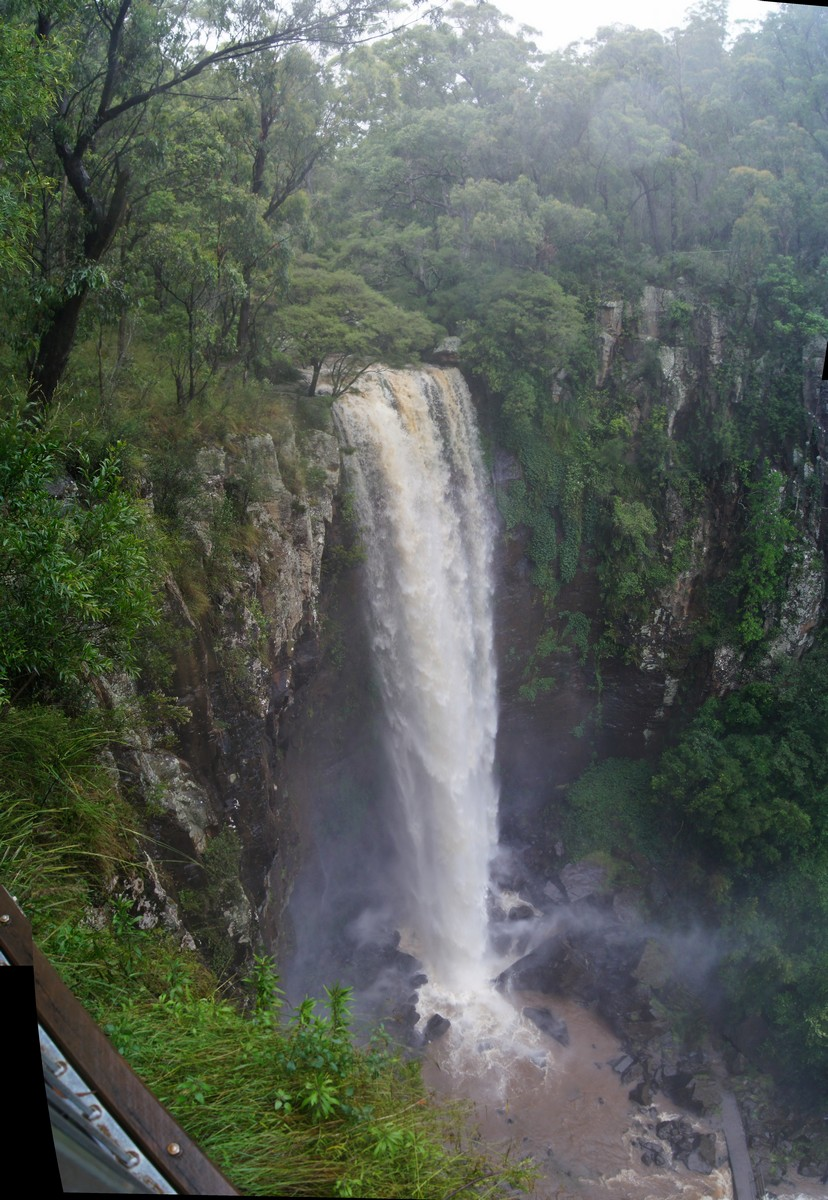
- Queen Mary Falls during flooding, 2010

- Interactive map of The Falls
- Coordinates: 28.3172°S 152.3947°E
- Country: Australia
- State: Queensland
- LGA: Southern Downs Region
- Location: 12.2 km (7.6 mi) E of Killarney; 45.8 km (28.5 mi) SE of Warwick; 59.6 km (37.0 mi) SW of Boonah; 147 km (91 mi) SW of Brisbane

Government
  - State electorate: Southern Downs
  - Federal division: Maranoa

Area
  - Total: 55.5 km^{2} (21.4 sq mi)

Population
  - Total: 51 (2021 census)
  - Density: 0.919/km^{2} (2.380/sq mi)
- Time zone: UTC+10:00 (AEST)
- Postcode: 4373
Suburbs around The Falls
Mount Colliery	Mount Colliery	The Head
Killarney	The Falls	Koreelah (NSW)
Legume (NSW)	Legume (NSW)	Koreelah (NSW)

The Falls is a rural locality in the Southern Downs Region, Queensland, Australia. It borders New South Wales. In the 2021 census, The Falls had a population of 51 people.

== History ==
The location presumably takes its name from the Queen Mary Falls on Spring Creek within the locality.

Ferndale Provisional School opened on 9 November 1948. In 1953 it became The Falls State School in 1953. The school closed on 26 August 1974. The school was located at 902 Spring Creek Road (28.3315°S 152.3885°E).

== Demographics ==
In the 2016 census, The Falls had a population of 70 people.

In the 2021 census, The Falls had a population of 51 people.

== Education ==
There are no schools in The Falls. The nearest government school is Killarney State School in neighbouring Killarney to the west, which provides primary schooling and secondary schooling to Year 10. For secondary schooling to Year 12, the nearest government secondary schools are Warwick State High School in Warwick to the west and Boonah State High School in Boonah to the north-east.

== Attractions ==
There are a number of attractions in the locality:

- Queen Mary Falls Lookout in the Main Range National Park, opposite 676 Spring Creek Road (28.3396°S 152.3733°E)
- Carrs Lookout, 1503 Spring Creek Road (28.2931°S 152.4160°E)
- Moss Gardens, Spring Creek Road about 2 kilometres (1.2 mi) after Carrs Lookout (28.2940°S 152.4433°E)
