= Palmeria coriacea =

Scientific classification
- Kingdom: Plantae
- Clade: Tracheophytes
- Clade: Angiosperms
- Clade: Magnoliids
- Order: Laurales
- Family: Monimiaceae
- Genus: Palmeria
- Species: P. coriacea

Binomial name
- Palmeria coriacea C.T.White

Species of flowering plant

Palmeria coriacea is a species of flowering plant in the family Monimiaceae and is endemic to places above 900 m (3,000 ft) between Mount Misery and the Tinaroo Range in Queensland.

The species was first formally described in 1936 by Cyril Tenison White in the Proceedings of the Royal Society of Queensland from specimens collected by Leonard John Brass on Thornton Peak at an altitude of 4,000 ft (1,200 m) in 1932. The specific epithet coriacea means "leathery".

Palmeria coriacea is listed as of "least concern" under the Queensland Government Nature Conservation Act 1992.
