= Mount Colliery, Queensland =

Mount Colliery
- Suburb
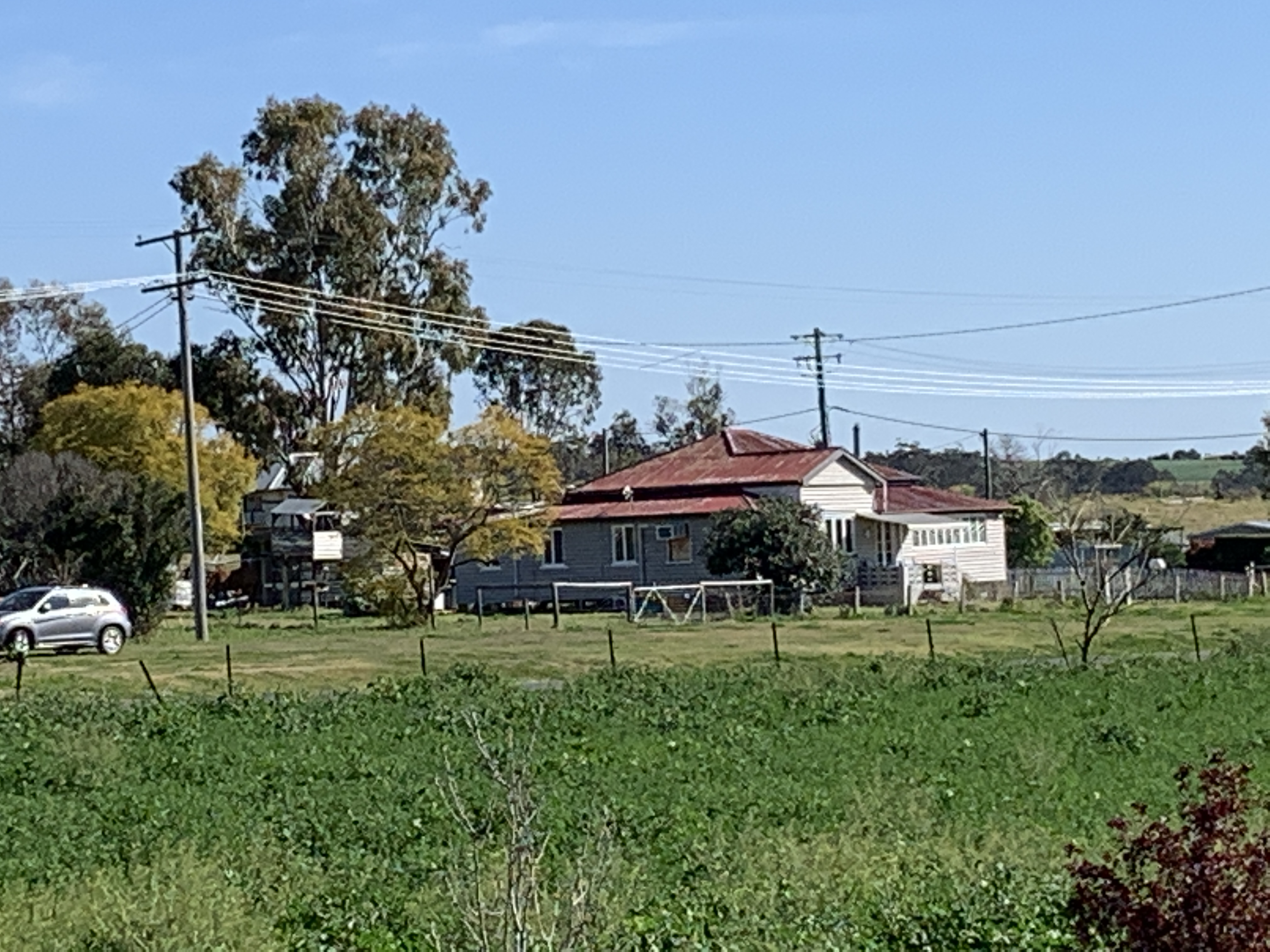
- Mount Colliery streetscape, 2021

- Interactive map of Mount Colliery
- Coordinates: 28.2591°S 152.3652°E
- Country: Australia
- State: Queensland
- LGA: Southern Downs Region
- Location: 4.1 km (2.5 mi) E of Tannymorel; 11.5 km (7.1 mi) N of Killarney; 30.4 km (18.9 mi) ESE of Warwick; 112 km (70 mi) SSE of Toowoomba; 178 km (111 mi) SW of Brisbane

Government
  - State electorate: Southern Downs
  - Federal division: Maranoa

Area
  - Total: 107.6 km^{2} (41.5 sq mi)

Population
  - Total: 117 (2021 census)
  - Density: 1.087/km^{2} (2.816/sq mi)
- Time zone: UTC+10:00 (AEST)
- Postcode: 4370
Suburbs around Mount Colliery
Emu Vale	Emu Vale	Emu Vale
Tannymorel	Mount Colliery	Carneys Creek
Killarney	The Falls	The Head

Mount Colliery is a rural locality in the Southern Downs Region, Queensland, Australia. In the 2021 census, Mount Colliery had a population of 117 people.

== History ==
In 1915, a former school building from Tannymorel was relocated to Mount Colliery. Tannymorel Colliery State School opened on 17 September 1915. In 1922, it was renamed Mount Colliery State School. It closed in 1968. It was located at 21 Roach Street (28.2863°S 152.2846°E).

Methodist church services were being held in private homes from at least December 1913. Fund raising to build a Methodist church was underway by June 1914. By October 1914, land for the church had been purchased. The stump-capping ceremony for Mount Colliery Methodist Church was held on Wednesday 27 January 1915. On Sunday 7 March 1915, the church was officially opened by Reverend Charles Martin (chairman of the Downs District Methodist Church). Although built by the Methodists, the church was available for use for any Protestant worship. The first couple to be married in the church were Arthur Collins and Millicent Bolton on 21 April 1915. It was subsequently sold and relocated to 15 Oak Street, Tannymorel, where it is used as a private residence.

The Church of England building was damaged in a cyclone in December 1915. St Augustine's Anglican Church was dedicated on 14 September 1941 by Archbishop William Wand. It closed circa 1989. It was at 17 Roach Street (28.2858°S 152.2844°E). The property was sold in August 1990 for $6,000. As at 2021, it is a private residence.

== Demographics ==
In the 2016 census, Mount Colliery had a population of 111 people.

In the 2021 census, Mount Colliery had a population of 117 people.

== Education ==
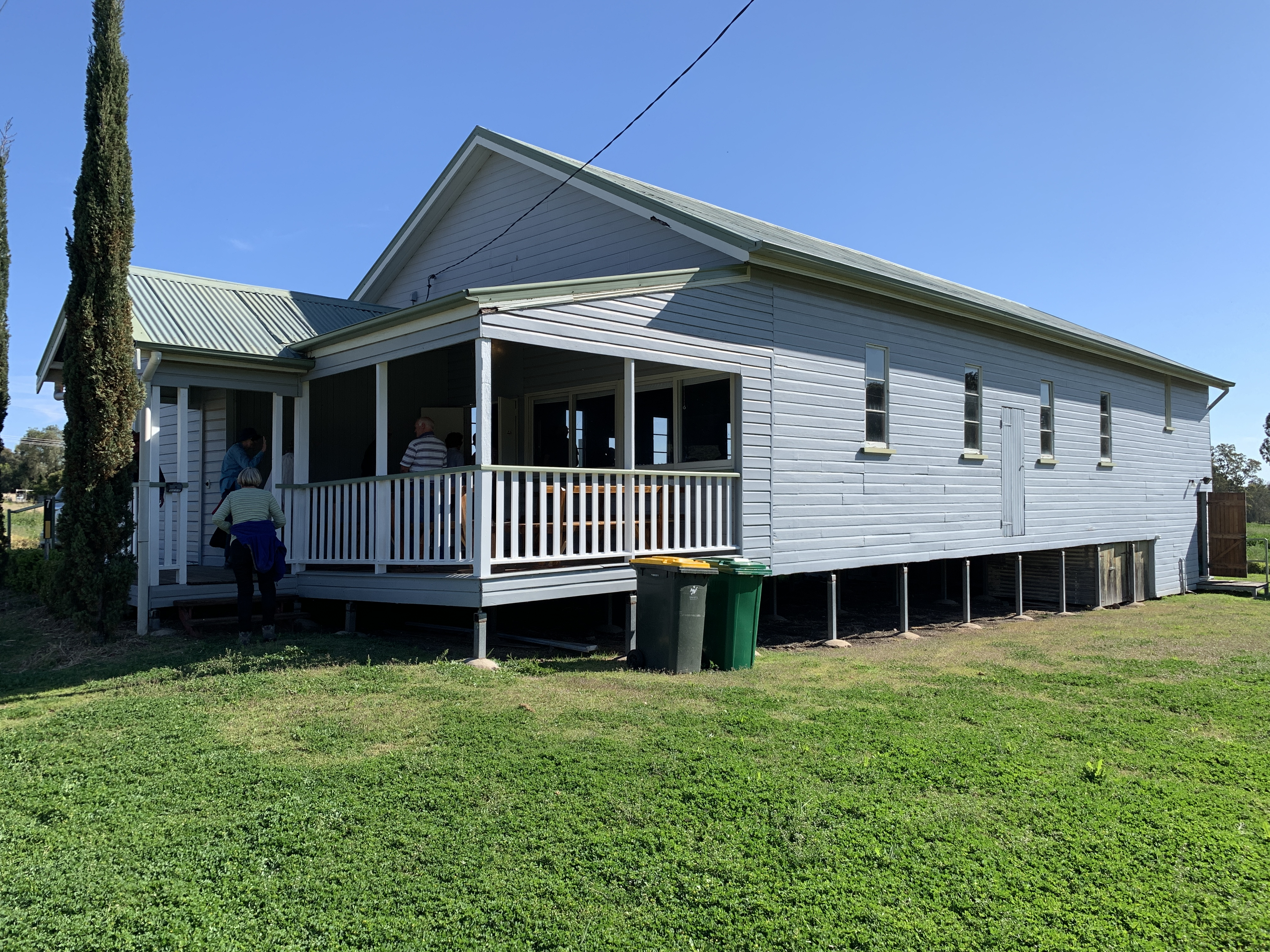
Mount Colliery community hall, 2021

There are no schools at Mount Colliery. The nearest government primary schools are Killarney State School in neighbouring Killarney to the south-west and Yangan State School in Yangan to the north-west. The nearest government secondary schools are Killarney State School (to Year 10) in Killarney and Warwick State High School in Warwick to the north-west.

== Amenities ==
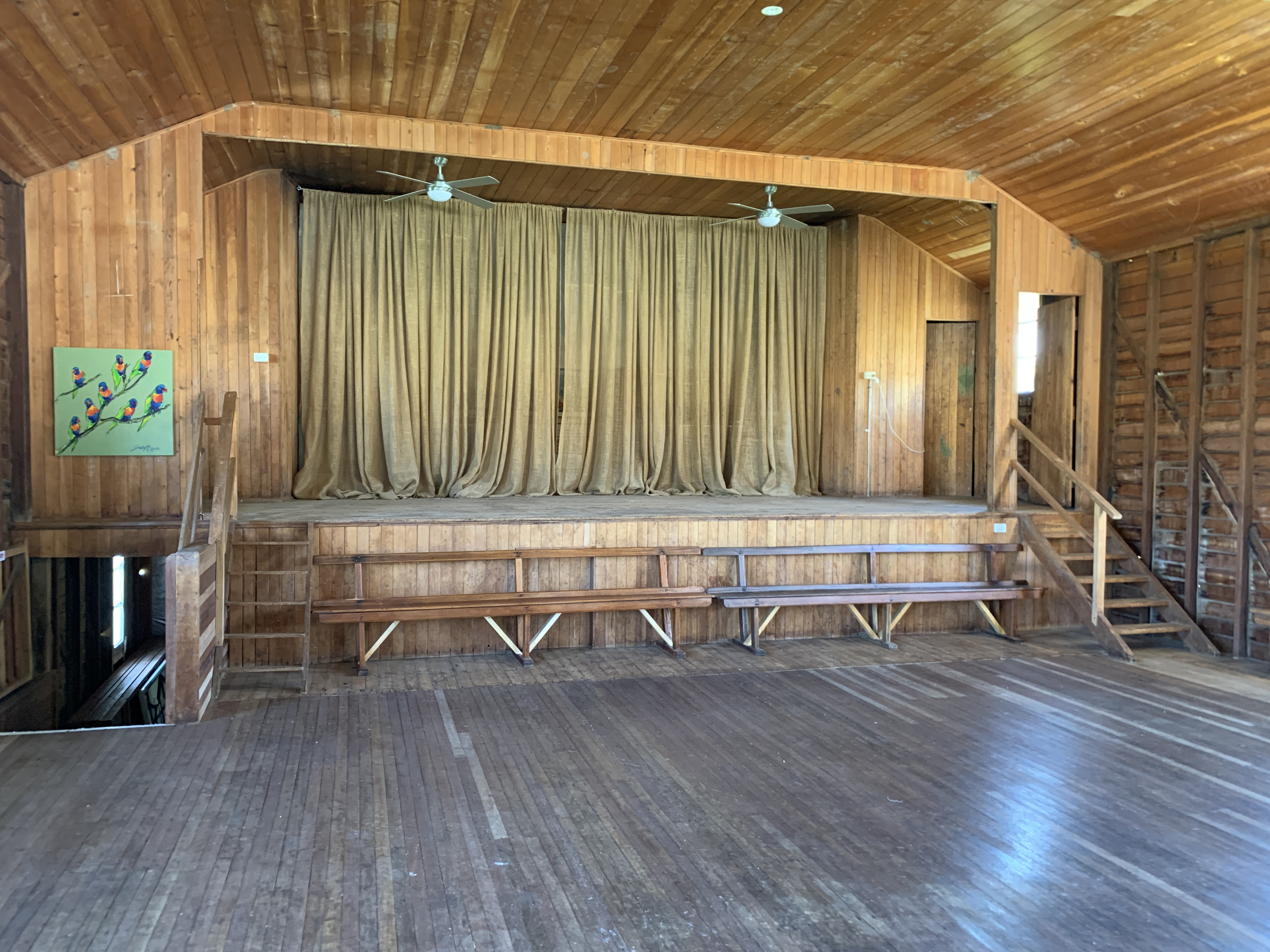
Interior of the Mount Colliery community hall, 2021

Mount Colliery Hall is at 7 Baker Road (28.2835°S 152.2860°E).

The Mount Colliery branch of the Queensland Country Women's Association meets at the Mount Colliery Hall.
