= Queen Mary Falls =

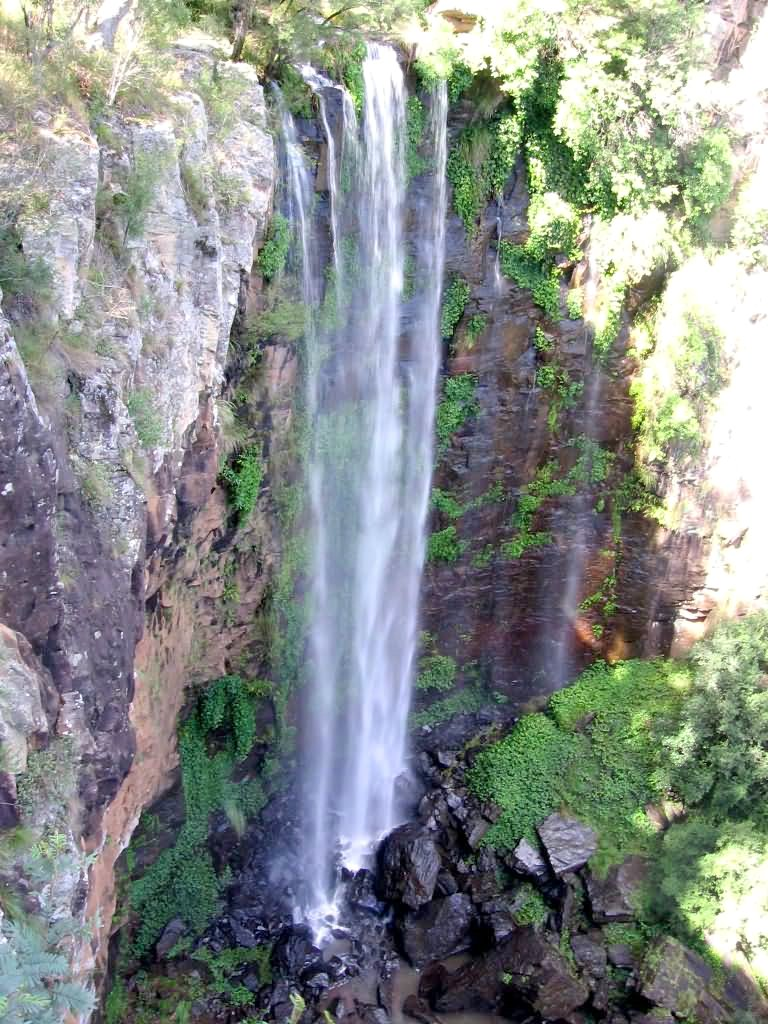
- Queen Mary Falls, pictured in 2006.

- Location within Queensland
- Location: Southern Downs Region, Queensland, Australia
- Coordinates: 28.3397°S 152.37333°E
- Type: Plunge
- Total height: 40 metres (130 ft)
- Number of drops: 1
- Longest drop: 40 metres (130 ft)
- Watercourse: Spring Creek

The Queen Mary Falls is a plunge waterfall on Spring Creek, in the locality of The Falls in the Southern Downs Region, Queensland, Australia.

== Location and features ==
The falls are situated in the Main Range National Park and descend 40 metres (130 ft) from the McPherson Range near the Queensland/New South Wales border. They are located 50 kilometres (31 mi) south-east of Warwick and 10 kilometres (6.2 mi) east of Killarney town.

The falls formed when water erosion by streams created gorges through layers of basalt and resistant trachyte. The falls are currently retreating as large blocks at the bottom of the falls were not evident in photos taken in the 19th century. Facilities at the falls include toilets, tables and fireplaces.

Four other waterfalls are located in the area surrounding Killarney, including the Teviot Falls, Daggs Falls, Browns Falls and Upper Browns Falls.

== See also ==
- List of waterfalls
- List of waterfalls in Australia
