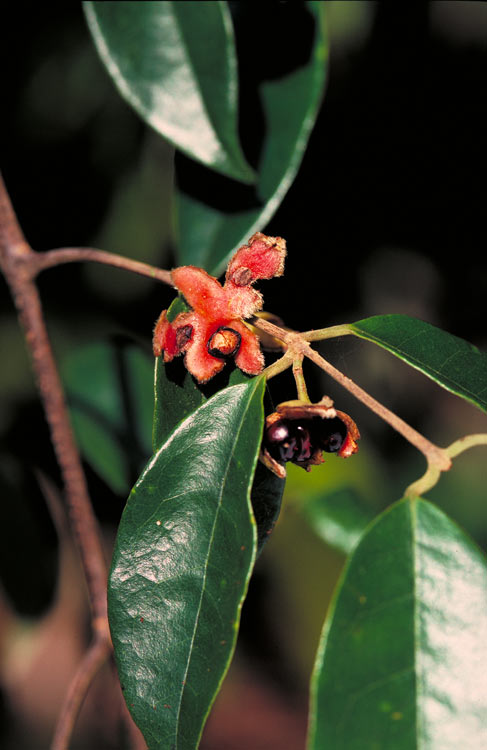
- Foliage and fruit

Conservation status
- Least Concern (NCA)

Scientific classification
- Kingdom: Plantae
- Clade: Tracheophytes
- Clade: Angiosperms
- Clade: Magnoliids
- Order: Laurales
- Family: Monimiaceae
- Genus: Palmeria
- Species: P. scandens

Binomial name
- Palmeria scandens F.Muell.
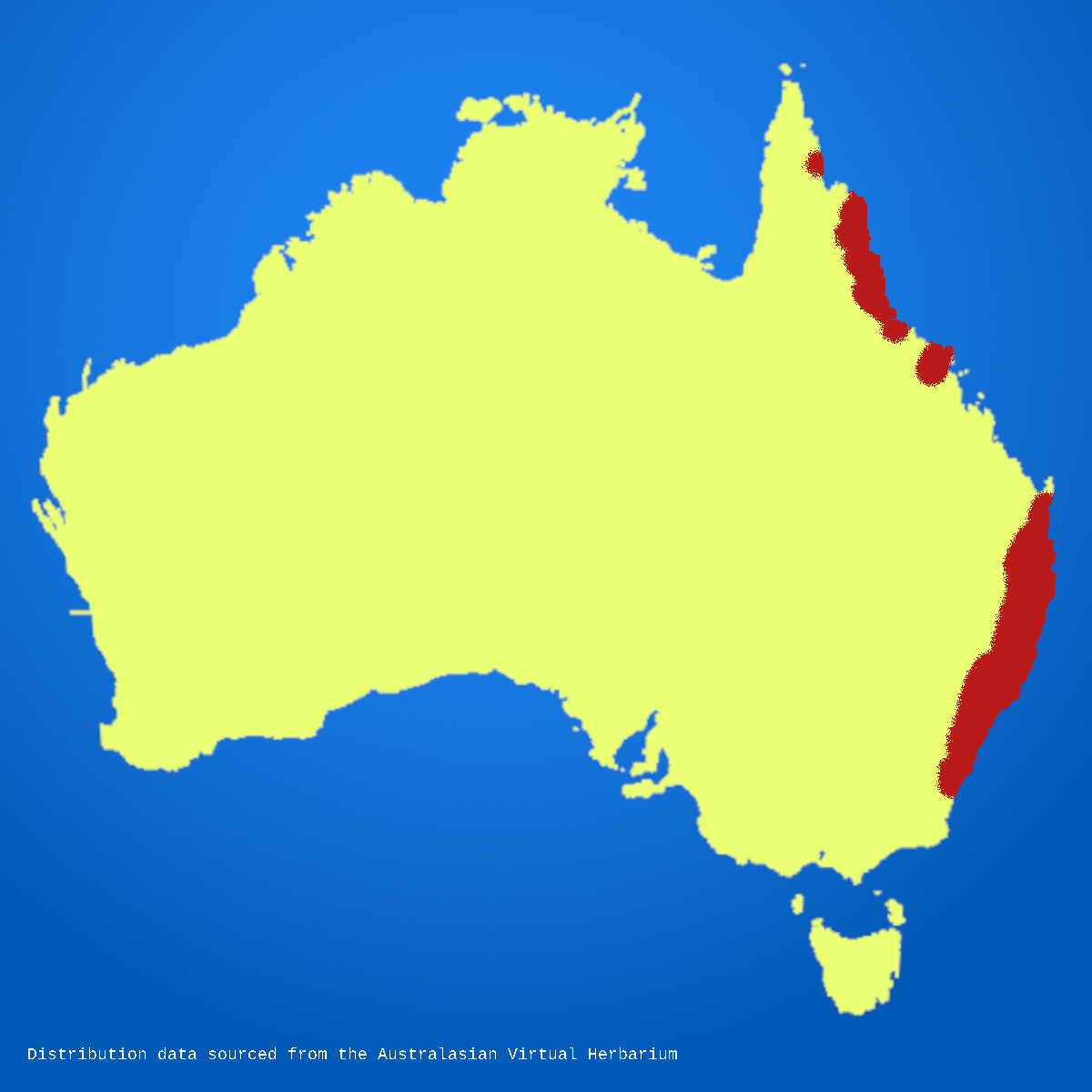

Synonyms
- List: Palmeria scandens var. typica Domin

= Palmeria scandens =

Anchor vine

Species of flowering plant

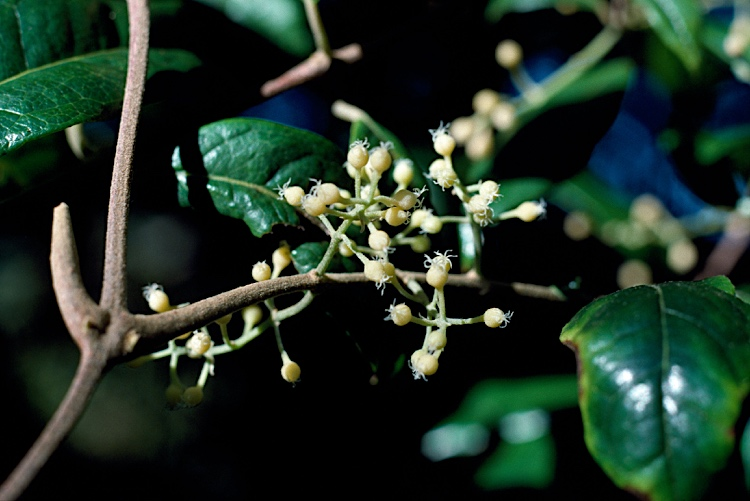
Male flowers

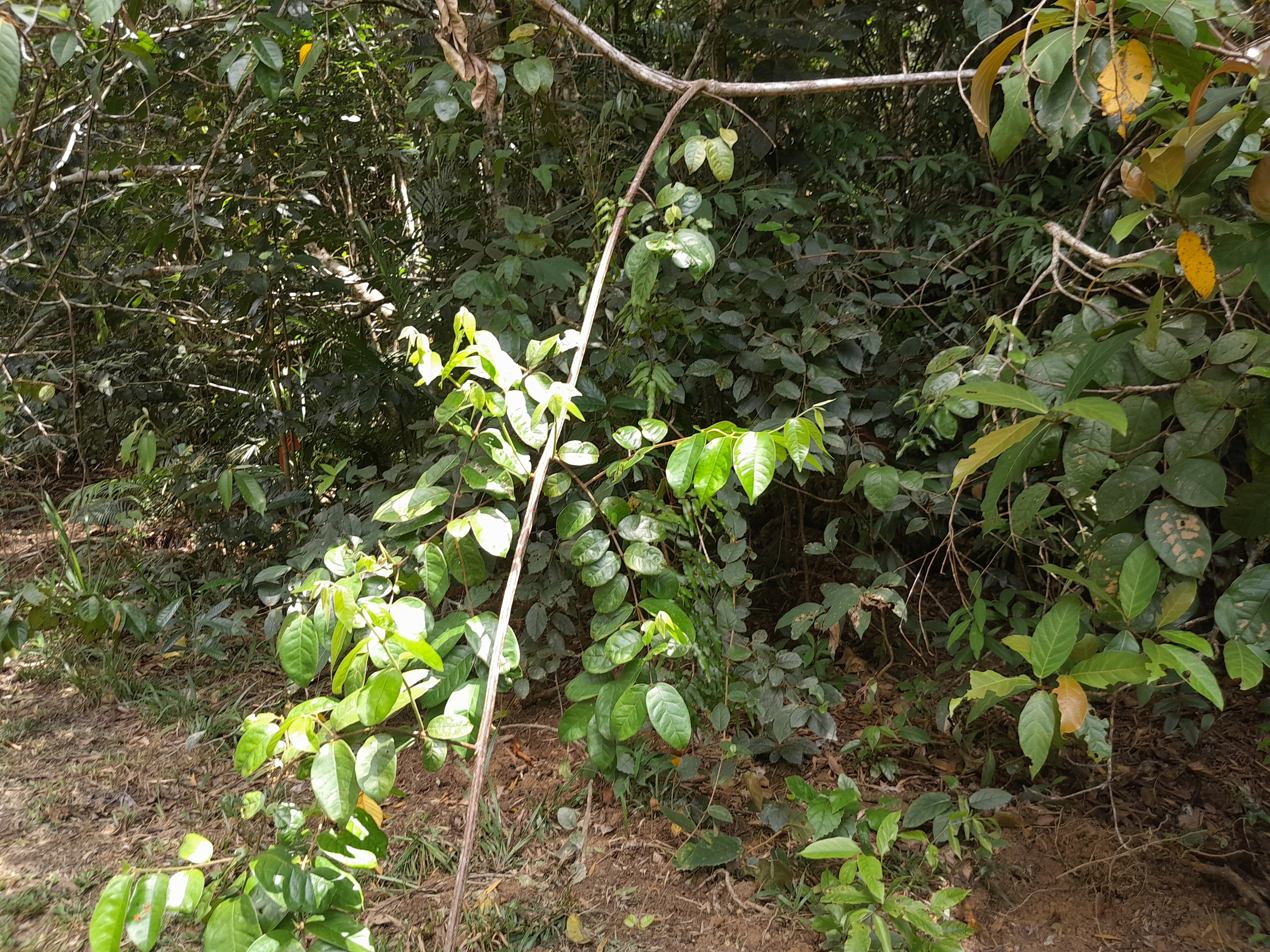
Habit

Palmeria scandens, commonly known as anchor vine or pomegranate vine, is a species of flowering plant in the family Monimiaceae and is native to Queensland, New South Wales and New Guinea. It is a woody vine with elliptic to oblong leaves and male and female flowers borne on separate plants, male flowers usually with thirty to forty stamens and female flowers with about ten carpels. The fruit is green, splitting to form a pinkish receptacle with 3 to 7 black or red drupes.

== Description ==
Palmeria scandens is tall woody climber, its stems covered with star-shaped hairs. Its leaves are usually elliptic to oblong, 45–190 mm (1.8–7.5 in) long and 20–90 mm (0.79–3.54 in) wide on a petiole 5–12 mm (0.20–0.47 in) long. The edges of the leaves are sometimes notched and both surfaces have soft hairs, often densely so on the lower surface.

Male and female flowers are borne on separate plants and have 4 or 5 tepals. Male flowers are borne in clusters of 7 to 15, 30–55 mm (1.2–2.2 in) long, each flower 3–8 mm (0.12–0.31 in) in diameter on a pedicel 4–8 mm (0.16–0.31 in) long, with usually 30 to 40 stamens about 1.5 mm (0.059 in) long. Female flowers are borne in clusters of 5 to 9, about 20 mm (0.79 in) long, each flower 2–3 mm (0.079–0.118 in) in diameter on a pedicel 4–5 mm (0.16–0.20 in) long, and have about 10 carpels. Flowering occurs from May to September, and the fruit is green on the outside, before splitting to reveal a pinkish receptacle, with 3 to 7 black or red more or less spherical drupes.

== Taxonomy ==
Palmeria scandens was first formally described in 1864 by Ferdinand von Mueller in his Fragmenta Phytographiae Australiae, from material collected by John Dallachy at Rockingham Bay. The specific epithet (scandens) is from Latin and means "climbing".

== Distribution ==
Anchor vine is widespread in rainforest from Batemans Bay in southeast New South Wales to the McIlwraith Range on Cape York Peninsula, Queensland, at altitudes from near sea level to 1,500 m (4,900 ft), and also occurs in New Guinea.

== Conservation ==
This species is listed by the Queensland Department of Environment and Science as of "least concern".
