= Browns Falls =

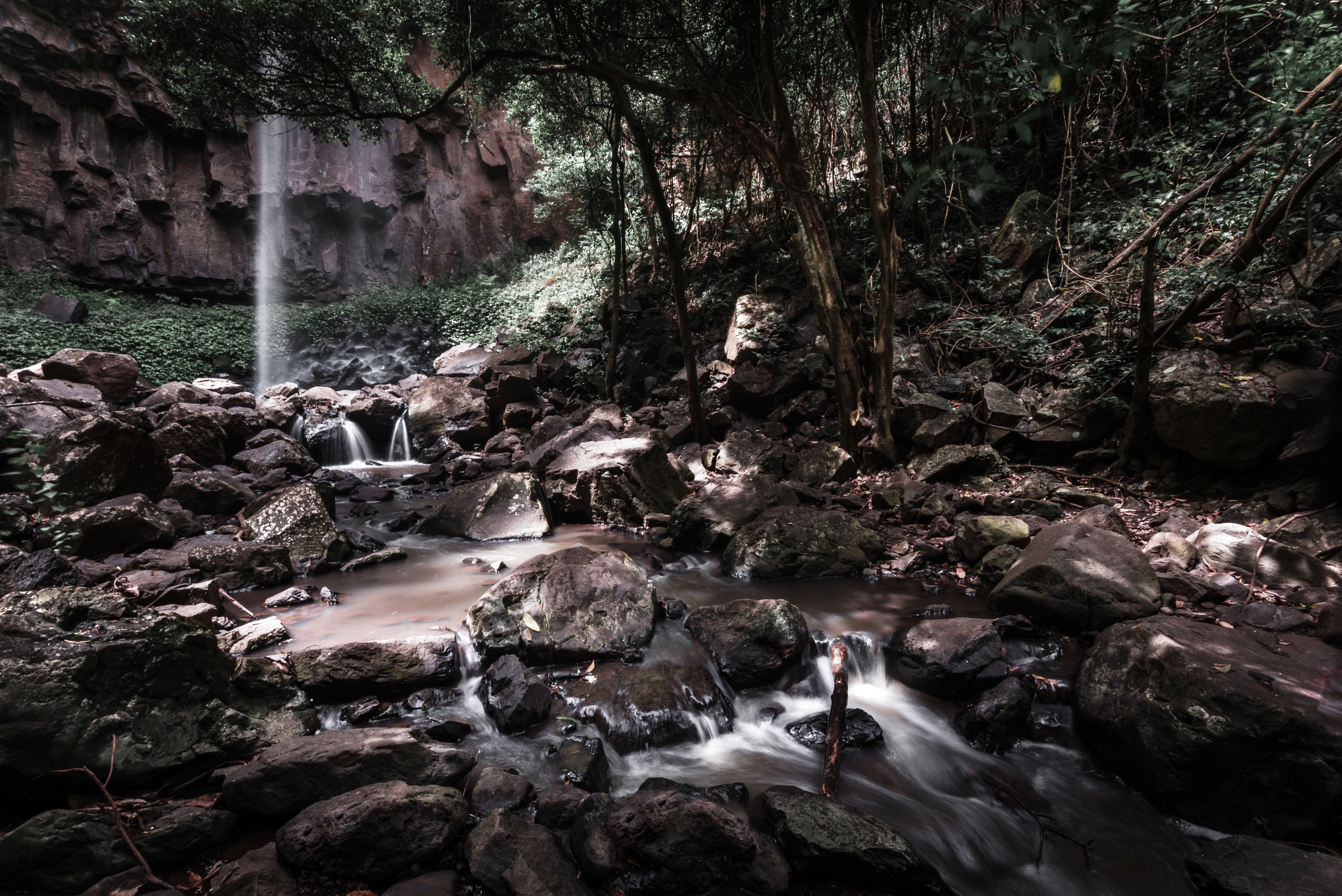
- Browns Falls 2017 Taken by Snapshotz Photography

- Location within Queensland
- Location: Killarney, Southern Downs Region, Queensland, Australia
- Coordinates: 28°21′00″S 152°21′00″E
- Type: Plunge
- Total height: 10–15 metres (33–49 ft)
- Watercourse: Spring Creek

The Browns Falls is a plunge waterfall on the Spring Creek (South Branch) in Killarney, Southern Downs Region, Queensland, Australia.

== Location and features ==
The falls are located approximately 4.5 kilometres (2.8 mi) east of Killarney in the Darling Downs, just north of the Queensland/New South Wales border. The falls descend approximately 10–15 metres (33–49 ft) as it plunges over basalt columns into the valley floor. Access to the falls is possible by walking approximately 600 metres (2,000 ft) from the Browns Picnic Area.

Four other waterfalls are located in the area surrounding Killarney, including the Teviot Falls in the north at Teviot Gap, Queen Mary Falls, Daggs Falls and Upper Browns Falls.

== See also ==
- List of waterfalls
- List of waterfalls in Australia
