= Wilsons Peak =

Mountain in Queensland Australia

- Jirramen
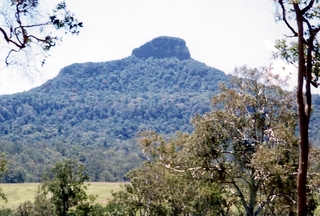
- Wilsons Peak, photographed from New South Wales

Highest point
- Elevation: 1,230 m (4,040 ft)
- Coordinates: 28°15′S 152°29′E

Geography
- Location within Queensland
- Location: Australia

Wilsons Peak (Aboriginal: Jirramen) 1,230 m (4,040 ft) is a mountain on the border of New South Wales and Queensland, Australia. Much of which is covered in rainforest. It marks the intersection of the Great Dividing Range with the McPherson Range in the Scenic Rim region. Wilsons Peak can be summited from eastern or western approaches by following the Darling Downs-Moreton Rabbit Board fence which straddles the border. Wilsons Peak is of volcanic origin, formed from volcanic activity from the Main Range Volcanic Plateau. The summit block which consists of volcanic Igneous rock, hosts many lithophyte communities mostly consisting of orchids and mosses. The summit area is covered in primarily Melaleuca shrubs. The entire mountain is located in national parks, with the Queensland side situated Main Range National Park, and the New South Wales side being in the adjacent Koorelah National Park.

Local Aboriginals referred to the mountain as "Jirramen," which is Uragapul for knee. This is derived from the fact that the shape of the top of the mountain bears some resemblance to a human knee. The mountain was named by Captain Patrick Logan, the notoriously brutal commander of the Moreton Bay penal settlement, in honour of a colleague he served with at Moreton Bay.

The local Aboriginal tribe used the peak to send a series of smoke signals along the Main Range. The other peaks used for the series of signals are: Mount Roberts, Doubletop, and Mount Mitchell.

== See also ==
- Wilsons Peak Flora Reserve
