= Killarney, Queensland =

Killarney
- Town
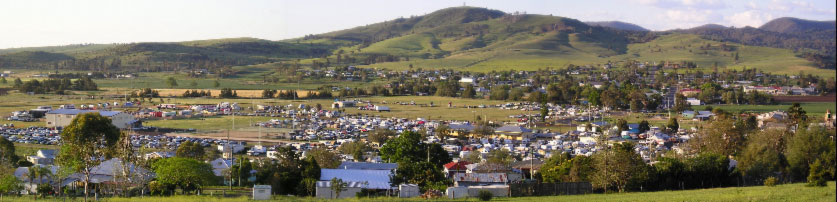
- View of Killarney from the south

- Interactive map of Killarney
- Coordinates: 28.3338°S 152.2961°E
- Country: Australia
- State: Queensland
- LGA: Southern Downs Region
- Location: 33.6 km (20.9 mi) SE of Warwick; 116.2 km (72.2 mi) SSE of Toowoomba; 177 km (110 mi) SW of Brisbane
- Established: 1878

Government
  - State electorate: Southern Downs
  - Federal division: Maranoa

Area
  - Total: 78.3 km^{2} (30.2 sq mi)
- Elevation: 507 m (1,663 ft)

Population
  - Total: 918 (2021 census)
  - Density: 11.724/km^{2} (30.37/sq mi)
- Time zone: UTC+10:00 (AEST)
- Postcode: 4373
- Mean max temp: 23.9 °C (75.0 °F)
- Mean min temp: 9.3 °C (48.7 °F)
- Annual rainfall: 741.8 mm (29.20 in)
Localities around Killarney
| Tannymorel | Mount Colliery | Mount Colliery |
| Loch Lomond | Killarney | The Falls |
| Elbow Valley | Legume (NSW) | Acacia Creek (NSW) |

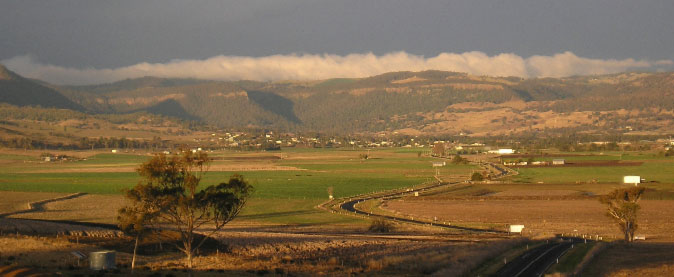
View of Killarney from the west

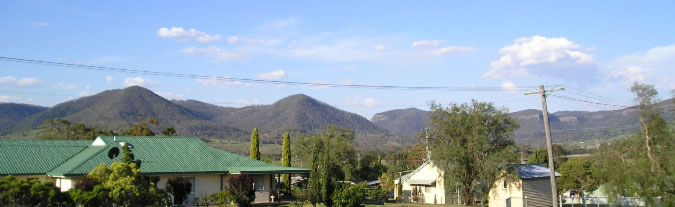
View of Killarney hills behind Killarney Memorial Aged Care

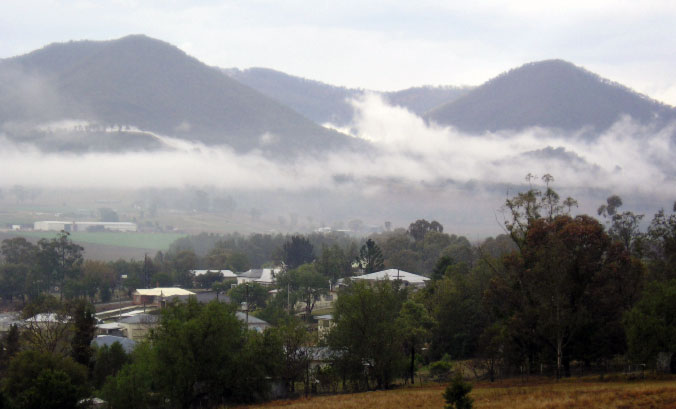
View of the misty hills Killarney to the north-east of Killarney

Killarney is a rural town and locality in the Southern Downs Region, Queensland, Australia. It borders New South Wales. In the 2021 census, the locality of Killarney had a population of 918 people.

== Geography ==
Killarney is located 35 kilometres (22 mi) south-east of Warwick on the Condamine River in the Darling Downs. Killarney is located about 8 kilometres (5.0 mi) from the Queensland/New South Wales border. It is close to Queen Mary Falls in the Main Range National Park, where Spring Creek plunges 40 metres (130 ft) into the valley.

Mountain View is a neighbourhood within the locality of Killarney (28.350°S 152.317°E).

Melrose is a neighbourhood within the locality of Killarney (28.360°S 152.254°E); it is associated with the Melrose pastoral station.

== History ==
The Gidhabal (also known as Gidabal, Kitabal) language region includes the landscape within the local government boundaries of the Southern Downs Regional Council, particularly Warwick, Killarney and Woodenbong, extending into New South Wales.

Killarney bordered on the northern boundaries of the Yetimarala people. Originally part of Canning Downs, established by the Leslie brothers in 1840, the development of the town was largely based on primary production and forestry.

The name of the district was chosen by the Hon. Peter Murray, who was visiting George Leslie at the Canning Downs pastoral station and commented that the scenery reminded him of Killarney in County Kerry, Ireland.

Killarney State School was established on 17 August 1874. However, it was not until 1 January 1876 that teacher Gwyther Hill was appointed and students enrolled.

The South Killarney town site was first surveyed in 1878, but the town already boasted several shops and services by this time. Many early settlers to Queensland selected land in the Killarney area with the first of these arriving in 1863. During the 1880s Killarney was described as "one of the most flourishing towns in Southern Queensland".

The first Killarney Post Office opened on 1 July 1877 (a receiving office had been open from 1875). Killarney North Post Office opened on 26 June 1889 (replacing Killarney North Railway Station receiving office open from 1887) and was renamed North Killarney in 1897. In 1905 the Killarney office was renamed Killarney South, and the North Killarney office became the second Killarney office, due to the town having moved to near the railway station.

A branch railway was built from Warwick in 1885. The line closed in 1964.

Mountain View Provisional School opened circa 1886 and closed in 1892. In 1895, it reopened as Mountain View State School, finally closing on 4 July 1965. It was at 11 Mountain View Road, Killarney (28.3523°S 152.3238°E).

A Methodist church opened in 1902. In 1919, the church building was relocated to Brighton (near Sandgate).

Melrose State School opened in 1910 and closed circa 1931.

Wynola State School was established in 1935 at River Bank 7 miles (11 km) from the town of Killarney, following the discovery that several families in that district were illiterate. It is presumed the school was in the vicinity of the Wynola pastoral station (28.313°S 152.350°E) to the north-east of the town on the Condamine River Road. The school building from the closed Melrose State School was relocated to establish the new school. The school was officially opened on 19 October 1935 by John Healy, the Member of the Queensland Legislative Assembly for Warwick. The school closed circa 1941.

The town was hit by a destructive tornado on Friday 22 November 1968, which destroyed many of the original buildings. The main street buildings that survived the storm: the Butter Factory, the Co-op Building, Mackenzie's Emporium (now a Saint Vincent de Paul shop), former Commercial Bank (opposite the Post Office), the Post Office and the Killarney Hotel, hint at the town's former glory. The former National bank building did survive the storm but was relocated to a suburb of Brisbane in 1977. The old Bank Vault foundation stones remain on the vacant block in the building's original location, adjacent to the St Vincent de Paul shop. November 2008 marks the 40th anniversary of this storm.

== Demographics ==
In the 2011 census, the locality of Killarney had a population of 984 people, while the town of Killarney had a population of 773 people.

In the 2016 census, the locality of Killarney had a population of 954 people.

In the 2021 census, the locality as a whole had a population of 918 people, while the town of Killarney had a population of 685 people.

== Economy ==
The local economy is underpinned by agriculture, transport and more recently tourism. Previously the abattoir was the largest employer (closed in February 2011).

== Water supply ==
Water to the town is supplied from a small weir on Spring Creek. In April 2007, the Courier Mail newspaper reported that the town might have to be evacuated due to water shortages caused by years of extreme drought. In January 2008 the Condamine River broke its banks after a week of steady rain and buildings in the main street were flooded. Despite the problems created by the floods, the water was beneficial to the farmers who had been in difficulties due to drought conditions before the flood.

== Education ==
Killarney State School is a government primary and secondary (Prep–10) school for boys and girls at 7 Acacia Street (28.3413°S 152.2978°E). In 2017, the school had an enrolment of 149 students with 15 teachers (14 full-time equivalent) and 14 non-teaching staff (11 full-time equivalent). It includes a special education program.

There are no secondary schools in Killarney offering Years 11 and 12; the nearest government secondary school offering Years 11 and 12 is Warwick State High School in Warwick.

== Amenities ==
Several key buildings remain in Willow St. The Killarney Post Office was built in 1905. The CWA building, formerly the School of Arts, was built in 1888 on stilts over Gravel Creek and is testament to how crowded the main street had become at the town's height. The historic Killarney Hotel is located in Willow St and is the third hotel to sit on this site.

The Killarney branch of the Queensland Country Women's Association meets at 12 Willow Street. It celebrated its 100th anniversary in March 2024.

== Attractions ==
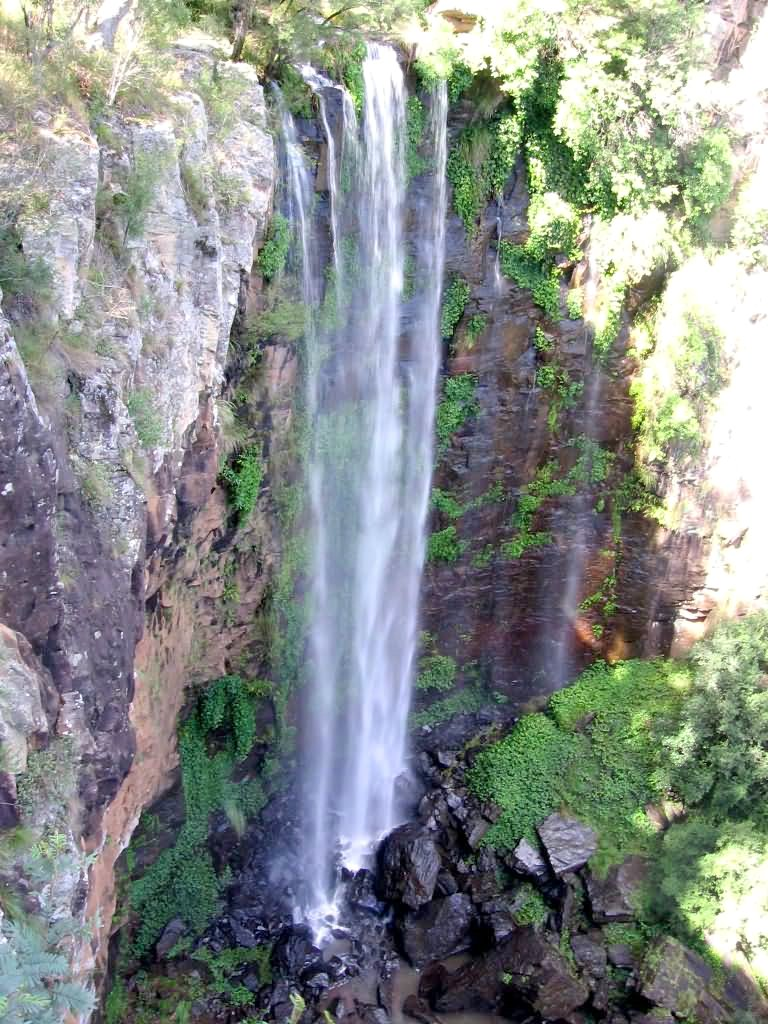
Queen Mary Falls are a short distance from Killarney

The five waterfalls surrounding Killarney make this area a popular scenic destination, the Teviot Falls, Queen Mary Falls, Dagg's Falls, Browns Falls and Upper Brown's Falls. During wet weather there are two additional falls, Black Fella Falls and Jack Brunton's Falls, which can be seen tumbling down the cliffs surrounding Killarney at the bottom of the Cambanoora Gorge.

The annual agricultural show; rodeos; various horse-related events; the Killarney Bonfire Night; the Border Ranges Trail Ride; the Pedal, Waddle and Saddle; and the Untamed Border Run are major events that attract substantial numbers of visitors to the town.

== Climate ==
Killarney has a cool subtropical climate, like most of inland south-east Queensland. Winters can be cold and frosty, while summers are warm but rarely hot.

Climate data for Killarney, Queensland
| Month | Jan | Feb | Mar | Apr | May | Jun | Jul | Aug | Sep | Oct | Nov | Dec | Year |
|---|---|---|---|---|---|---|---|---|---|---|---|---|---|
| Record high °C (°F) | 39.6 (103.3) | 39.3 (102.7) | 35.3 (95.5) | 33.1 (91.6) | 29.4 (84.9) | 24.3 (75.7) | 25.4 (77.7) | 30.0 (86.0) | 32.0 (89.6) | 36.0 (96.8) | 39.1 (102.4) | 38.9 (102.0) | 39.6 (103.3) |
| Mean daily maximum °C (°F) | 29.4 (84.9) | 28.3 (82.9) | 26.8 (80.2) | 24.1 (75.4) | 20.5 (68.9) | 17.6 (63.7) | 17.0 (62.6) | 18.7 (65.7) | 21.9 (71.4) | 25.1 (77.2) | 27.7 (81.9) | 29.2 (84.6) | 23.9 (75.0) |
| Mean daily minimum °C (°F) | 15.8 (60.4) | 15.9 (60.6) | 14.3 (57.7) | 10.2 (50.4) | 6.4 (43.5) | 3.5 (38.3) | 2.1 (35.8) | 2.7 (36.9) | 5.3 (41.5) | 9.1 (48.4) | 12.2 (54.0) | 14.3 (57.7) | 9.3 (48.7) |
| Record low °C (°F) | 9.4 (48.9) | 6.4 (43.5) | 3.3 (37.9) | 0.6 (33.1) | −3.3 (26.1) | −8.2 (17.2) | −7.8 (18.0) | −6.0 (21.2) | −3.5 (25.7) | −3.5 (25.7) | 2.8 (37.0) | 4.3 (39.7) | −8.2 (17.2) |
| Average precipitation mm (inches) | 96.0 (3.78) | 87.7 (3.45) | 76.5 (3.01) | 46.4 (1.83) | 44.5 (1.75) | 45.4 (1.79) | 44.3 (1.74) | 31.6 (1.24) | 39.8 (1.57) | 64.0 (2.52) | 74.8 (2.94) | 92.9 (3.66) | 744.4 (29.31) |
| Average precipitation days | 9.6 | 9.8 | 9.8 | 7.4 | 7.4 | 7.0 | 6.3 | 5.5 | 5.6 | 7.5 | 8.3 | 9.5 | 93.7 |
Source: Bureau of Meteorology

== Notable people ==
- Jackie Howe, champion shearer, born in Killarney
- Otto Madsen, politician
- Steph Hancock, footballer
- Rohan Hancock, footballer
- Hugh Cornish, Australian celebrity, born in Killarney
