= Limpinwood =

Limpinwood may refer to:

- Limpinwood, New South Wales
- Limpinwood Nature Reserve
