= Cougal Spiral =

Heritage listed railway track and tunnel in New South Wales, Australia

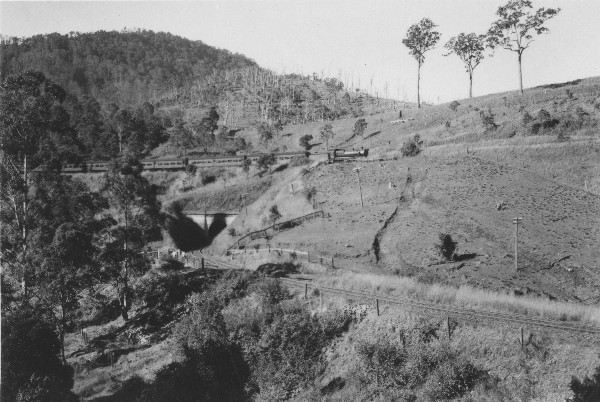
- The Brisbane Mail crossing over No.1 Spiral Tunnel in 1940

- Location on the border between New South Wales and Queensland

Overview
- Official name: Border Loop railway formation and landscape
- Other names: Border Tunnel; Border Loop Spiral; Cougal To Border Loop
- Line: North Coast railway line
- Location: Richmond Gap connecting New South Wales and Queensland, Australia
- Coordinates: 28°21′16″S 152°57′51″E

Operation
- Opened: 29 August 1930
- Owner: Transport Asset Manager of New South Wales
- Operator: Australian Rail Track Corporation

Technical
- Length: A series of three tunnels: 192 metres (630 ft); 177 metres (581 ft); 1,160 metres (3,810 ft)
- Track gauge: 4 ft 8 1/2 in (1,435 mm) standard gauge
- Grade: 1.5%

Route map
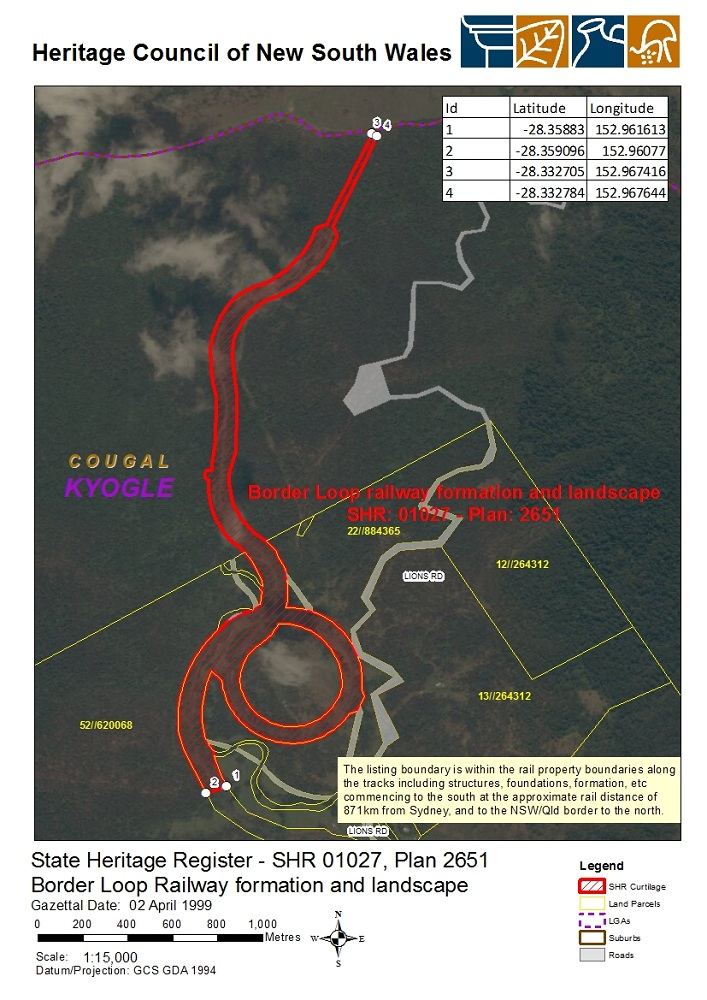

New South Wales Heritage Register
- Official name: Border Loop railway formation and landscape; Cougal To Border Loop; Railway Spiral and Landscape
- Type: State heritage (landscape)
- Designated: 2 April 1999
- Reference no.: 1027
- Type: Historic Landscape
- Category: Landscape – Cultural

The Cougal Spiral is a heritage-listed single track railway tunnel and spiral in Australia. The feature is located on the North Coast railway line in Australia that connects New South Wales with Queensland under the Border Ranges near Richmond Gap. It was built during 1930. It is also known as the Border Loop railway formation and landscape, Cougal To Border Loop and Railway Spiral and Landscape. The property was added to the New South Wales State Heritage Register on 2 April 1999.

The railway line needs to climb at a steady ruling gradient from Kyogle to the summit at a tunnel at the border between the two states. The border is also at the watershed. The rail spiral and associated facilities are located between 871 and 876 kilometres (541 and 544 mi) from Sydney Central railway station.

== Description ==
Climbing almost non-stop at the ruling grade of 1 in 66 or 1.5% (compensated) the line has almost continuous curves of 240 m (790 ft) radius. Near Cougal, the alignment finally runs out of valley, and has nowhere to go. Fortunately a convenient hill allows the line to circle back on itself so that it climbs 30 metres (98 ft) without having to make any forward progress.

The common name of 'Border Loop' for the Cougal Spiral has itself led to ambiguity in descriptions of the feature itself. The single rail line heading north makes a spiral round this hill, mostly comprising surface track plus two short curved tunnels (one where it passes under itself, the other through a small spur in the hillside). The surface line travels a further 2 kilometres (1.2 mi) north to cross the state border under the Border Ranges by passing through a longer, straight summit tunnel.

Soon after the Border Tunnel under the watershed is reached the line curves westward and descends on the other side. A lower summit, perhaps without the spiral, would have been possible with a considerably longer and more expensive summit tunnel, with the possibility of problems with fumes for both the original steam locomotives and the replacement diesel engines.

The Cougal Spiral is easily viewed from parts of the Lions Road. The structure has been heritage listed due to its historical, scientific and architectural rarity. It opened on 29 August 1930 as part of the extension of the North Coast line from Kyogle to South Brisbane.

The Cougal Railway Spiral and Landscape consists of the following elements:

- a 192-metre (630 ft) concrete tunnel, located from 871.947 to 872.139 kilometres (541.803 to 541.922 mi) from Central;
- a 177-metre (581 ft) concrete tunnel, located from 872.661 to 872.838 kilometres (542.246 to 542.356 mi) from Central;
- an underbridge, constructed of five 20.12-metre (66.0 ft) steel spans RSJ on concrete piers, located at 873.217 kilometres (542.592 mi) from Central;
- the Border Loop crossing, located at 875.110 kilometres (543.768 mi) from Central (no longer extant); and
- a 1,160-metre (3,810 ft) tunnel on the border with Queensland, located from 875.482 to 876.642 kilometres (543.999 to 544.720 mi) from Central.

The heritage feature is formed by the whole section of line from Cougal to the Border Tunnel.

== History ==
The 'Border Loop' opened on 29 August 1930, connecting New South Wales and Queensland by rail beneath Richmond Gap.

== Heritage listing ==
As at 19 July 2013, the Cougal to Border Loop section of the North Coast Line was a notable engineering achievement, revealing a twentieth century engineering solution that allows trains to pass through the steep topography at the NSW/Queensland border.

The 'Border Loop' railway formation and landscape was listed on the New South Wales State Heritage Register on 2 April 1999 having satisfied the following criteria.

The place is important in demonstrating the course, or pattern, of cultural or natural history in New South Wales.

The completion of the Cougal Spiral to Border Tunnel section of the North Coast Railway was a major engineering feat in the first half of the twentieth century, being one of several major engineering projects in NSW that allowed continuous railway access between Sydney and Brisbane.

The place is important in demonstrating aesthetic characteristics and/or a high degree of creative or technical achievement in New South Wales.

The combination of tunnels, crossing loops, the underbridge and spiral together form a technically significant example of an innovative and successful railway engineering solution.

The place possesses uncommon, rare or endangered aspects of the cultural or natural history of New South Wales.

The railway spiral at 'Border Loop' is one of only two railway spirals in NSW.

== See also ==
- List of tunnels in Australia
- Rail transport in New South Wales
