= Border Ranges National Park =

National park in New South Wales, Australia

- IUCN category II (national park)
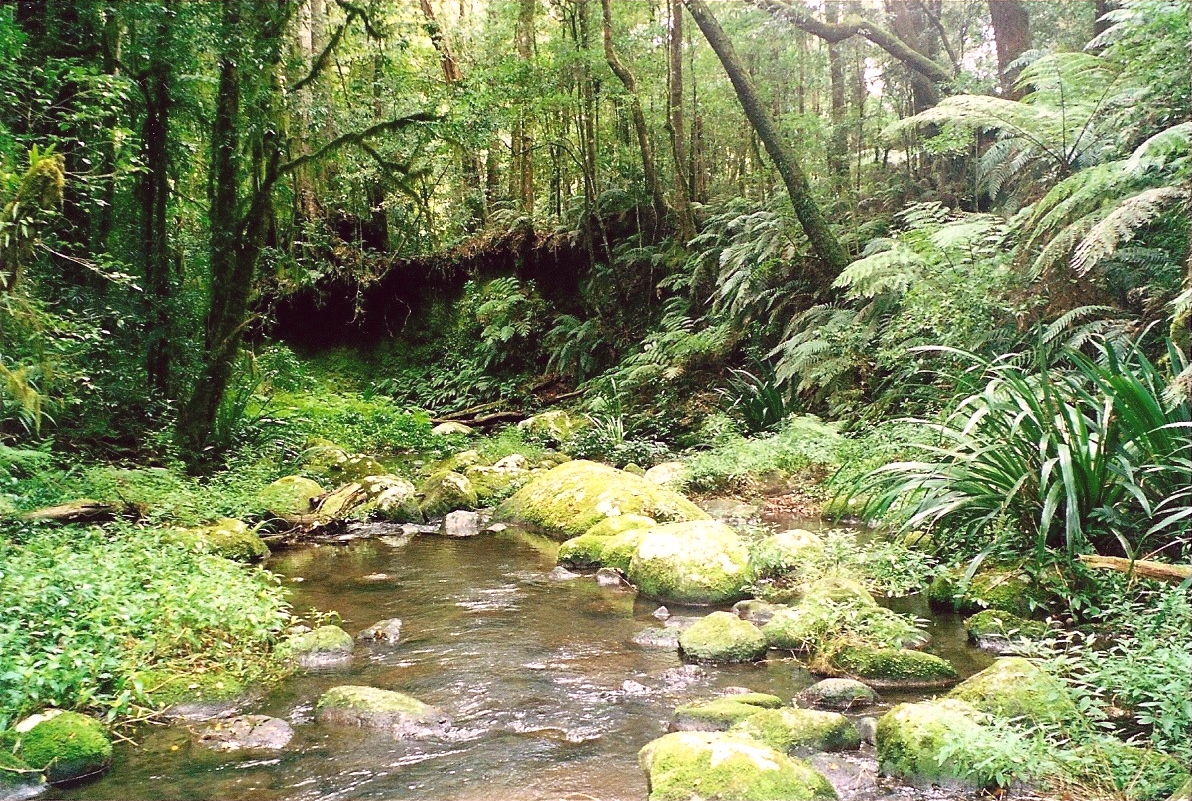
- Brindle Creek in the Border Ranges National Park is an impressive rainforest stream.

- Location within New South Wales
- Location: New South Wales
- Nearest city: Kyogle
- Coordinates: 28°21′35″S 152°59′10″E
- Area: 317.29 km^{2} (122.51 sq mi)
- Established: 8 June 1979
- Governing body: NSW National Parks & Wildlife Service
- Website: https://www.nationalparks.nsw.gov.au/visit-a-park/parks/border-ranges-national-park

The Border Ranges National Park is a protected national park in the Northern Rivers region of New South Wales, Australia. A small portion of the national park is also located in South East Queensland. The 31,729-hectare (78,400-acre) park is situated approximately 150 kilometres (93 mi) south of Brisbane, north of Kyogle.

The park is part of the Shield Volcano Group World Heritage Site Gondwana Rainforests of Australia inscribed in 1986 and added to the Australian National Heritage List in 2007.

== Geology ==
The Border Ranges region, which includes the McPherson Range, Tweed Range, Lamington Plateau and Levers Plateau, were formed from the erosion of the Tweed Volcano over many years. A number of volcanic plugs remain in the Border Ranges National Park. Notable for extensive stands of Nothofagus moorei (Antarctic beech), the park offers a 64 kilometres (40 mi) gravel road circuit through sub tropical, cool and warm temperate rainforest types. The area was extensively logged during the 20th century, providing timber to a number of nearby sawmills. The Lions Road and the Sydney–Brisbane rail corridor pass through the park at its narrow middle section.

== Flora and fauna ==
Border Ranges and Lamington National Park are recognised as a biodiversity hotspot, containing a mixture of northern and southern flora species (the McPherson-Macleay overlap) with a number of endemic, rare and endangered species. Fauna is similarly diverse and species like the Hastings River mouse, have been rediscovered in the park in recent years.

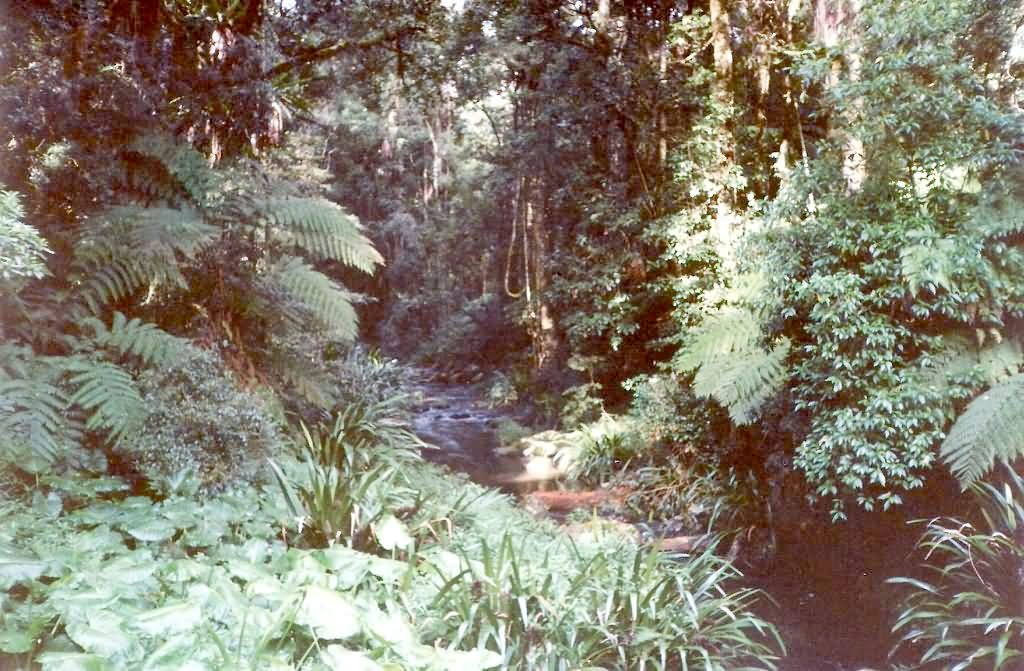
A diverse set of subtropical rainforest flora is preserved along Brindle Creek.

Lower areas of the park contain eucalypt forests that provide habitat for eastern grey kangaroos, red-necked wallabies and koalas. Pademelons and potoroo are also found in the park as well as a diverse array of birdlife including the rare Albert's lyrebird. The park is part of the Scenic Rim Important Bird Area, identified as such by BirdLife International because of its importance in the conservation of several species of threatened birds.

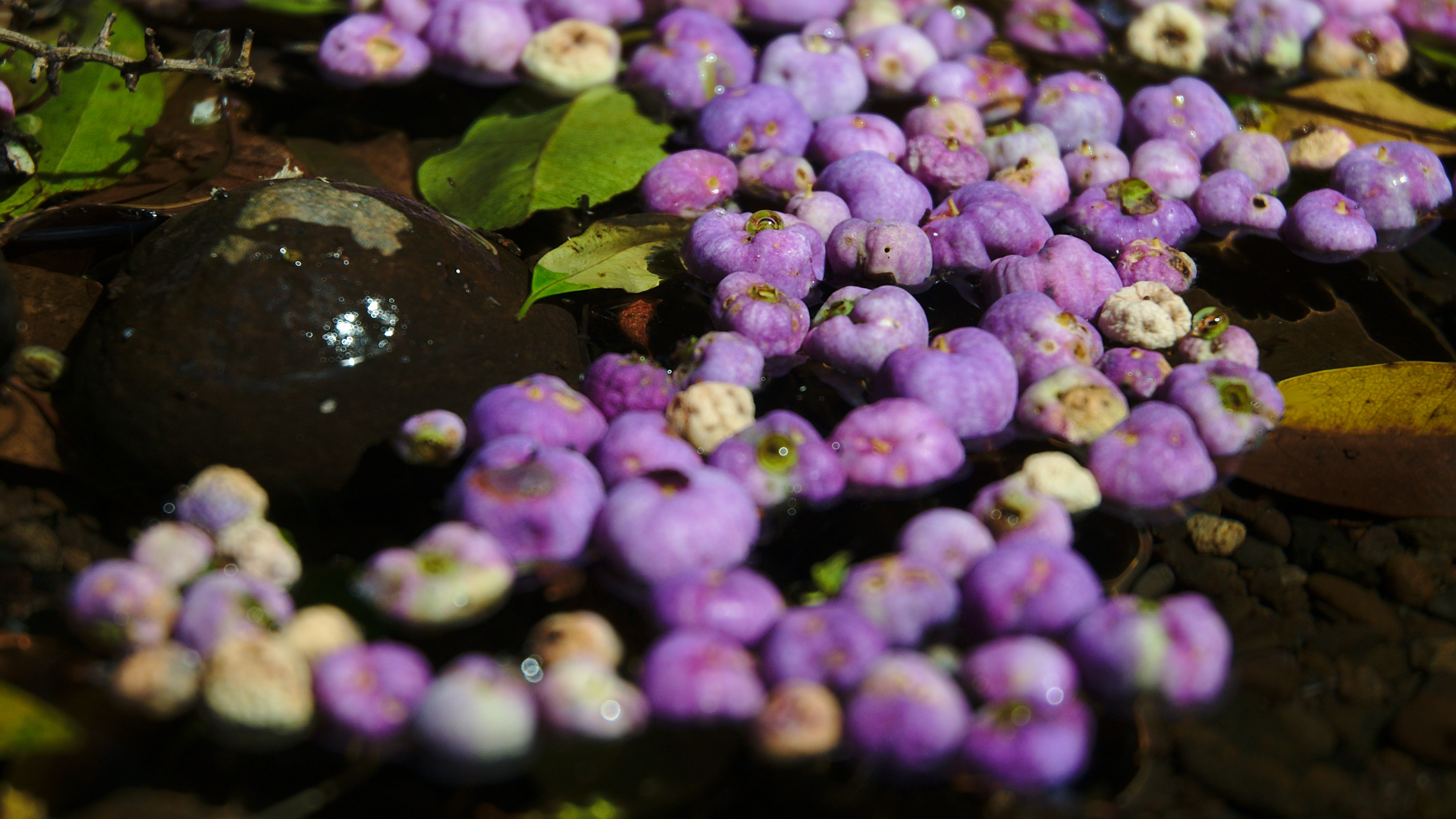
fruit of Syzygium francisii in Sawpit Creek, in the Border Ranges National Park. It dropped prodigious quantities of fruit, which floated down stream and collected in beautiful pink rafts, such as this.

The Border Ranges contains one of Australia's most diverse range of spider species within its montane rainforests.

== Facilities ==
Two camp grounds (car/camper and walk-in tent camping only) and a number of picnic areas, some with shelters, water and composting toilets, are available at various points in the rainforest adjacent to the road, and one picnic spot at Blackbutts Lookout, has extensive views to Mount Warning, and of the Tweed Valley, an erosion caldera which, while broken by the sea on its eastern flank, is considered larger in size than the Ngorongoro Crater in Tanzania.

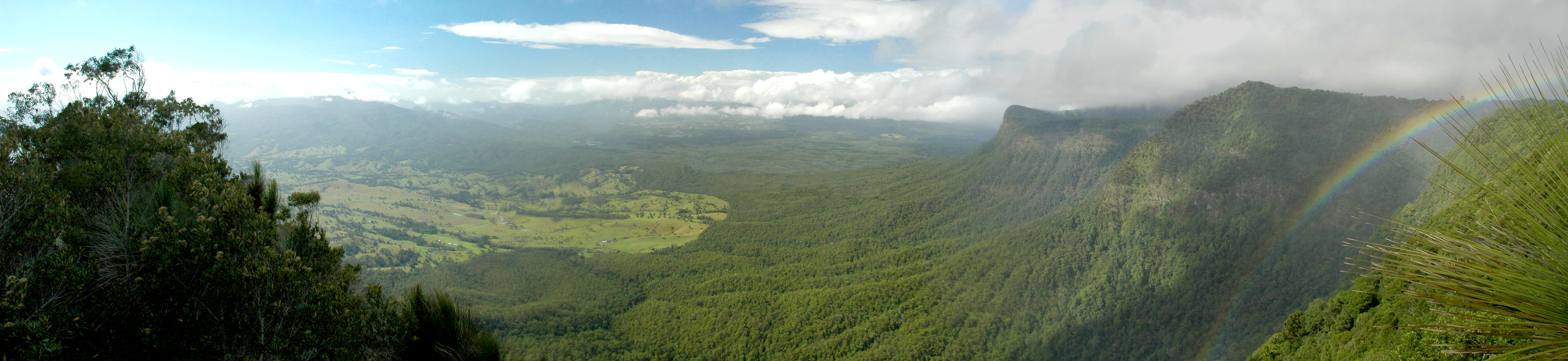
From a lookout in Border Ranges National Park, NSW Australia looking over the Tweed Valley with The Pinnacle distinctive in the centre right.

== See also ==
- Protected areas of New South Wales
- High Conservation Value Old Growth forest
