= Wollumbin National Park =

National park in Australia

- IUCN category II (national park)
- Location within New South Wales
- Location: New South Wales
- Coordinates: 28°23′23″S 153°16′07″E
- Area: 24 km^{2} (9.3 sq mi)
- Established: 1 October 1967
- Governing body: National Parks and Wildlife Service (New South Wales)

Wollumbin National Park (previously known as 'Mount Warning National Park') is a national park located in northern New South Wales, Australia, 642 kilometres (399 mi) north of Sydney near the border with the state of Queensland. It surrounds Mount Warning, part of a remnant caldera of a much larger extinct volcano (the Tweed volcano). The park is administered by the NSW National Parks & Wildlife Service. The park is part of the Scenic Rim Important Bird Area, identified as such by BirdLife International because of its importance in the conservation of several species of threatened birds. In addition to numerous bird species, carpet python, land mullet, eastern small-eyed snake, lace monitor, black-bellied marsh snake and long-nosed potoroo can be found here.

Wollumbin rises to 1157 metres above sea level.

== History ==
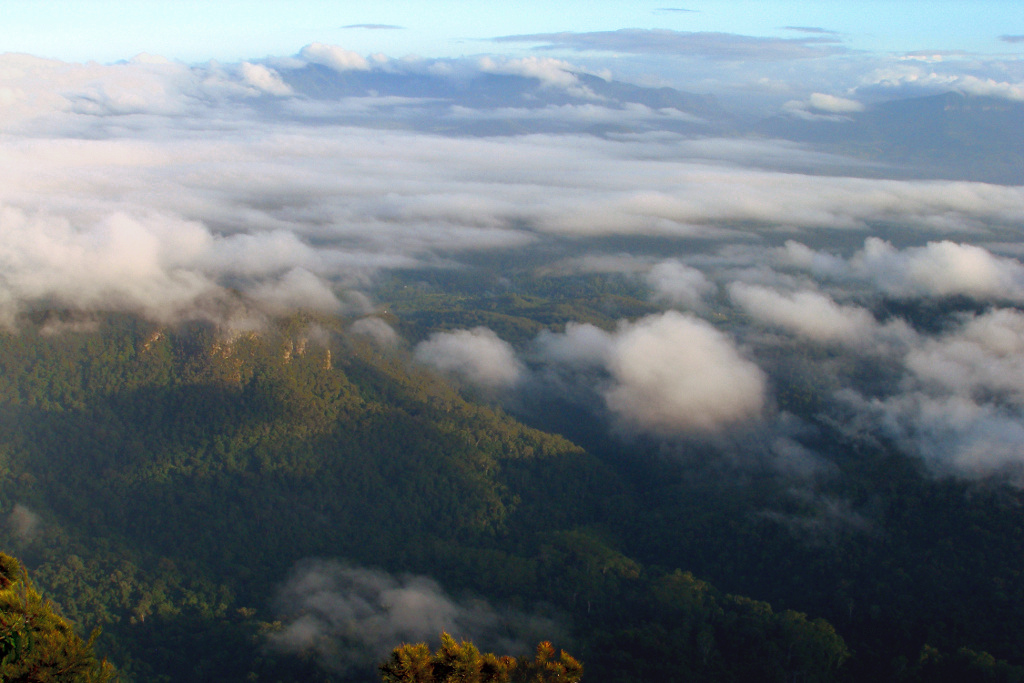
From summit at sunrise

The park incorporates lands of traditional significance to the local Bundjalung people. The local Aboriginal name for the mountain is "Wollumbin"; meaning, "cloud-catcher", or alternatively "fighting chief of the mountains". The mountain's English name was bestowed on it by Lieutenant James Cook in May 1770, as his expedition in command of the Endeavour passed it by on their route northwards along the eastern coastline of Australia. The designation "Mount Warning" was meant to indicate the danger of the offshore reefs they encountered. The park was reserved for public recreation in 1928 and dedicated as a national park in 1966. The Park is part of the Shield Volcano Group of the World Heritage Site Gondwana Rainforests of Australia inscribed in 1986 and added to the Australian National Heritage List in 2007.

== See also ==
- Protected areas of New South Wales
- High Conservation Value Old Growth forest
