= Syzygium nebulosum =

Scientific classification
- Kingdom: Plantae
- Clade: Embryophytes
- Clade: Tracheophytes
- Clade: Spermatophytes
- Clade: Angiosperms
- Clade: Eudicots
- Clade: Rosids
- Order: Myrtales
- Family: Myrtaceae
- Genus: Syzygium
- Species: S. nebulosum

Binomial name
- Syzygium nebulosum L.Weber

Species of tree

Syzygium nebulosum, is a rare tree in the myrtle family, endemic to a small area on the border of the states of Queensland and New South Wales, in eastern Australia. Growing up to 25 metres tall, it is found on the Mount Warning caldera. The plant is named nebulosum for the cloudy and misty habitat.
