= Limpinwood Nature Reserve =

Protected area in New South Wales, Australia

- IUCN category Ib (wilderness area)
- Location within New South Wales
- Location: New South Wales
- Nearest city: Limpinwood
- Coordinates: 28°17′56″S 153°10′26″E
- Area: 26.46 km^{2} (10.22 sq mi)
- Established: April 1963
- Governing body: NSW National Parks and Wildlife Service
- Website: Official website

The Limpinwood Nature Reserve is a protected nature reserve that is located on the Northern Rivers region of New South Wales, in eastern Australia. The reserve was gazetted in April 1963 with additions made in 1967, over former fauna and crown reserves, and further additions were made in 1988 to make the reserve to its current area of 2,646 hectares (6,540 acres). The reserve is situated north-west of the rural locality of Limpinwood, and north of Tyalgum and defines part of the state border between New South Wales and Queensland.

The reserve is part of the Shield Volcano group of the UNESCO World Heritage–listed Gondwana Rainforests of Australia inscribed in 1986 and added to the Australian National Heritage List in 2007. It is also part of the Scenic Rim Important Bird Area, identified as such by BirdLife International because of its importance in the conservation of several species of threatened birds.

The traditional owners of this reserve are the Ngandowal and Minyungbal speaking people of the Bundjalung Nation.

== Description ==
The vegetation of the reserve is primarily sub-tropical rain forest with some wet sclerophyll forest.

Two watercourses named Hidden and Finches Creeks flow to the east out of the reserve. It was dedicated as a Flora Reserve in 1963. Flora Reserve is the highest protected status for forest areas in the Australian National Parks system. Prior to 1963 the area was classified as a Forest Reserve. The fringes of the reserve were logged for red cedar, hoop pine and white beech. Bullock teams were used to drag out the logs. The reserve is composed of virgin old growth sub-tropical rain forest and hardwood species - flooded gum, tallowwood, ironbark and white mahogany.

The reserve has no formed walking tracks. It has no public access except through Lamington National Park in Queensland. On the New South Wales side of the border it is bounded by private landholdings. It includes an area of escarpment rising to over 1,000 metres (3,300 ft) above sea level that forms part of the state border. It is intended to be a place where the flora and fauna are free from interference from humans, domestic animals and feral pests.

== See also ==
- Protected areas of New South Wales
- High Conservation Value Old Growth forest
