= Nugurun Falls =

- Location within Queensland
- Location: Lamington National Park, Australia
- Coordinates: 28°14′13″S 153°09′05″E
- Type: Cascade
- Number of drops: 2
- Watercourse: West Canungra Creek

Nugurun Falls is a small waterfall on West Canungra Creek, a tributary of the Logan River, in Queensland, Australia. The waterfall is located within the Green Mountains section of Lamington National Park, in the Scenic Rim Region, near the resort village of O'reillys. Like other waterfalls in the area, Nugurun Falls is surrounded by dense rainforest.

== Namesake ==
The word 'Nugurun' is believed to be an Aboriginal word from the Bundjalung language, meaning 'dingo'.

== Access ==
The falls are accessible by the 10.9 km metre maintained Box Forest Circuit walking track from O'Reilly's, the track is unsuitable for wheelchairs and bicycles and is a medium-steep level on foot. There are many more waterfalls along the circuit.

== See also ==
- List of waterfalls
- List of waterfalls in Australia
