= Fenwicks Scrub Flora Reserve =

Protected area in New South Wales, Australia

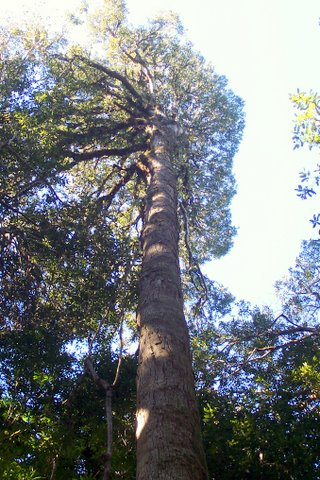
- Large Native Crabapple over the sassafras and coachwood canopy in the reserve.

- Location within New South Wales
- Location: New South Wales
- Nearest city: Port Macquarie
- Coordinates: 31°17′S 152°8.8′E
- Area: 1.1 km^{2} (0.42 sq mi)
- Governing body: NSW National Parks and Wildlife Service
- Website: Official website

The Fenwicks Scrub Flora Reserve is a protected nature reserve that is located on the Mid North Coast of New South Wales, Australia. The 110-hectare (270-acre) reserve is situated west of Port Macquarie on the Great Dividing Range. The reserve is dominated by warm temperate rainforest. Rainforest occurs between 990 and 1,100 metres (3,250 and 3,610 ft) above sea level. The 20 metres (66 ft) tall canopy is 98% sassafras and coachwood.

In 1994 the reserve was inscribed as part of the UNESCO World Heritage Gondwana Rainforests of Australia; one of the fifty separate protected reserves and national parks that stretch from Newcastle to Brisbane, clustered around the New South Wales – Queensland border. The entire Gondwana Rainforests was gazetted on the Australian National Heritage List on 21 May 2007 under the Environment and Heritage Legislation Amendment Act (No. 1), 2003 (Cth).

== See also ==
- Protected areas of New South Wales
