= Lions Road =

Section of road in Australia

Coordinates: 28.3318°S 152.9729°E

Lions Road New South Wales

General information
- Type: Rural road

Major junctions
- North end: Running Creek Road, Running Creek, Queensland
- South end: Gradys Creek Road, Loadstone, New South Wales

Location(s)
- Major settlements: Cougal, New South Wales

The Lions Road is a section of the road running between the Summerland Way in New South Wales and the Mount Lindesay Highway near Rathdowney, Queensland at Running Creek. It joins two pre-existing sections of rural road, namely Gradys Creek Road in New South Wales and Running Creek Road in Queensland. It was so named as most of the funding, planning and voluntary labour for the road came from the Kyogle branch of the Lions Club. Kyogle resident Jack Hurley was one of the most prominent advocates of the road. Despite the NSW Government rejecting the idea in 1969, it was opened the following year.

It connects these two roads over the Richmond Gap in the McPherson Range. For a good deal of its length it is a narrow one-laned road that cannot be used by trucks or cars towing caravans or trailers. In the 1990s the road was fully sealed with bitumen but the original alignments were largely unaltered, leading to possible surprises for inexperienced drivers who allow themselves to build up excessive speed, particularly on steep mountainous stretches. On the NSW side there are many bridges over small creeks, with steep approaches. They were of wooden construction that could only support low vehicular weights, but almost all of them were replaced by concrete bridges in 2017–18. All the bridges on the Queensland side are concrete, but several of them are one-lane bridges on which vehicles travelling 'upstream' must give way before entering the bridge.

In 2017, Kyogle Council started a major upgrade program where all but two of the narrow timber bridges were replaced by modern concrete bridges. The remaining timber bridges do not have the weight limitations required, and will be replaced at the end of their natural life. The road was fully reopened in May 2018 following extended delays and closures.

The road runs through the Border Ranges National Park and it is altogether a scenic drive. The road also parallels the main Brisbane-Sydney railway line, including near a feature of the railway line known as the Cougal Spiral (or Border Loop). It passes adjacent to a small section of the Mount Chinghee National Park.

== See also ==
- Road transport in Australia
