= Mount Warning =

Mountain in New South Wales, Australia

Wollumbin
- Bundjalung: Wollumbin
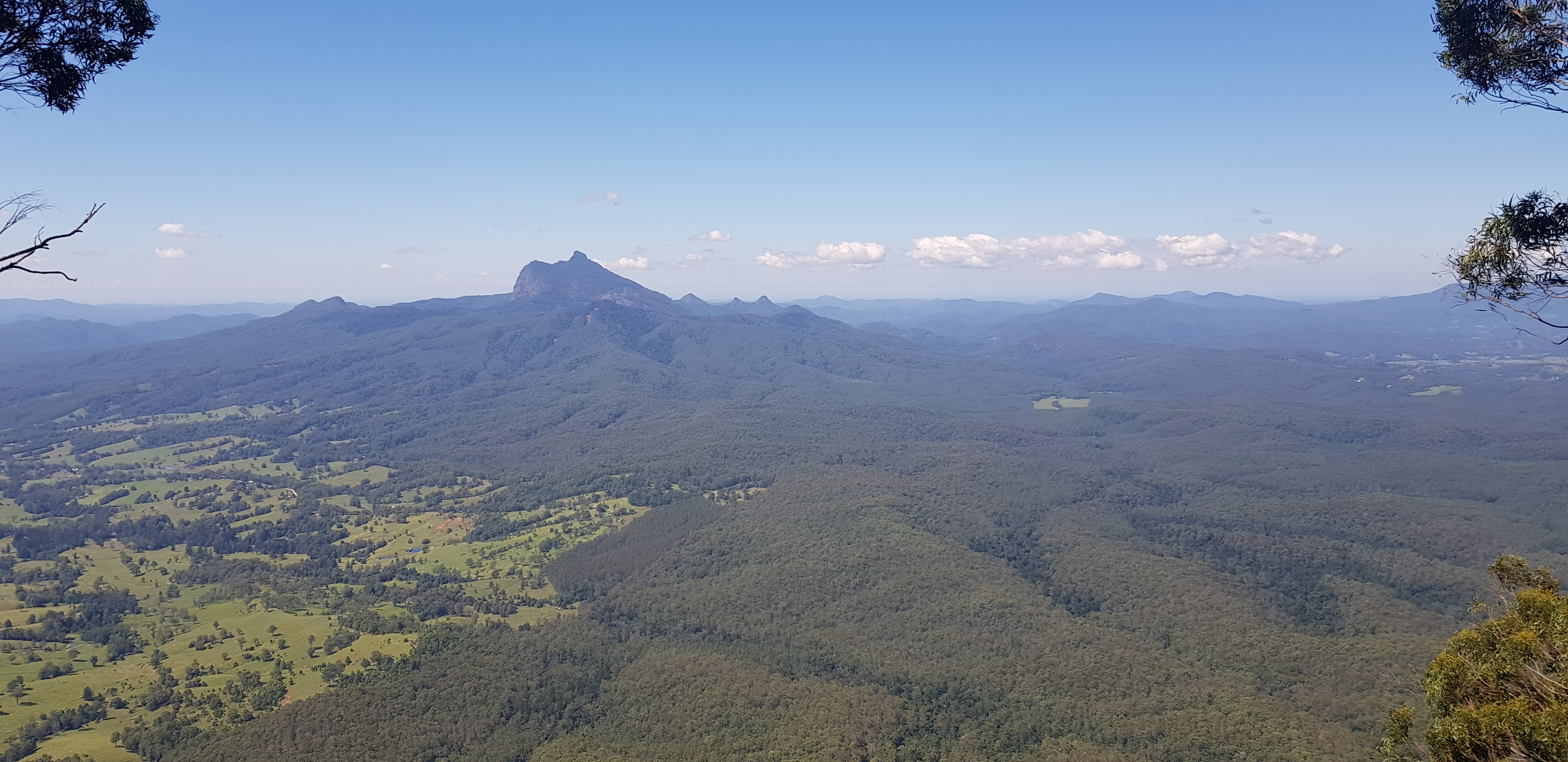
- Mount Warning as seen from the Border Ranges in New South Wales, 2023

Highest point
- Elevation: 1,159 m (3,802 ft)
- Prominence: 952 m (3,123 ft)
- Coordinates: 28°23′50″S 153°16′15″E

Geography
- Location within New South Wales
- Location: Northern Rivers, New South Wales, Australia
- Parent range: Tweed Range

Geology
- Rock age: Over 23 million years
- Mountain type: Volcanic plug
- Last eruption: ~23 Ma

Mount Warning (Bundjalung: Wollumbin, Wool-oom-bin), a mountain in the Tweed Range in the Northern Rivers region of New South Wales, Australia, was formed from a volcanic plug of the now-extinct Tweed Volcano. The mountain is located 14 kilometres (9 mi) west-south-west of Murwillumbah, near the border between New South Wales and Queensland. Lieutenant James Cook saw the mountain from the sea and named it Mount Warning.

== Shield volcano ==
Wollumbin is the central volcanic remnant of an ancient shield volcano, the Tweed Volcano, which would have been about 1,900 m (6,200 ft) above sea level or just under twice the height of the current mountain. This volcano last erupted around 23 million years ago. The mountain's central vent shrank as it cooled, forming a depression at the top that has greatly eroded.

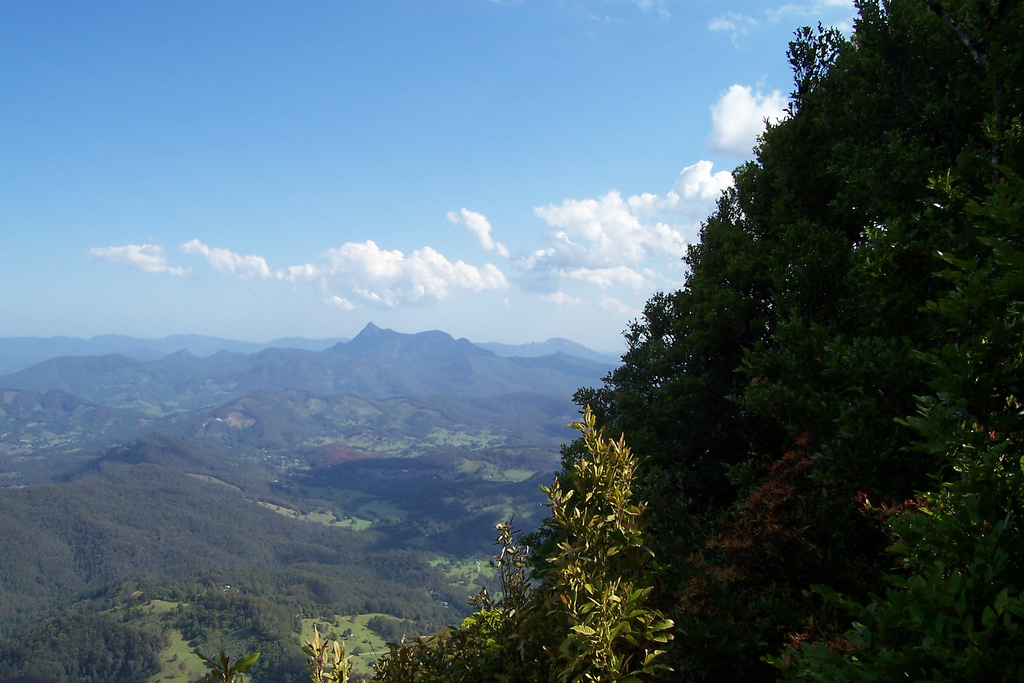
Wollumbin and surrounds

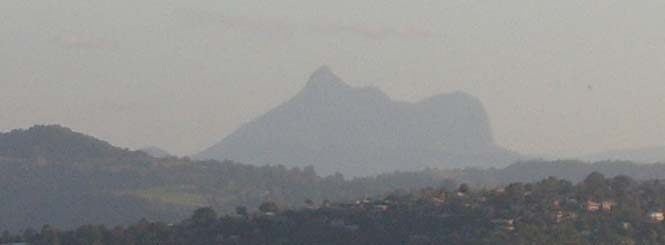
Wollumbin seen from Point Danger, Coolangatta

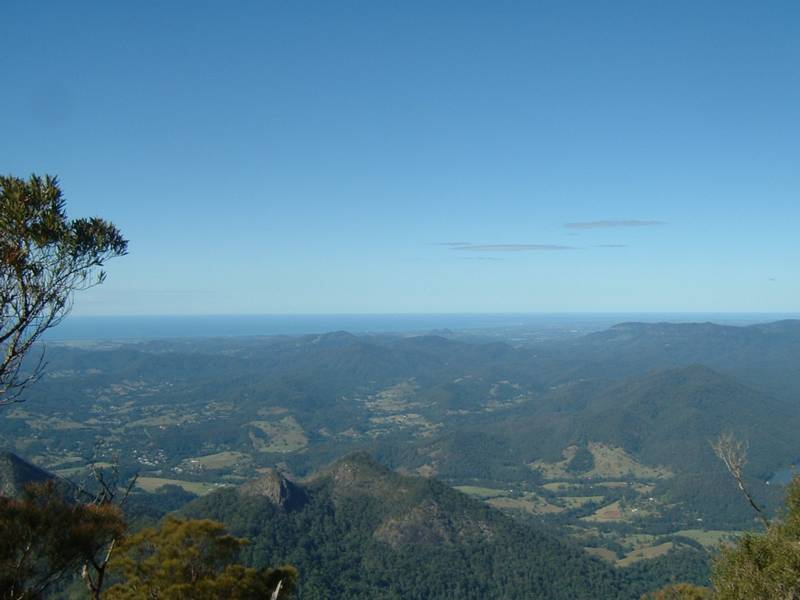
View of Byron Bay and surrounding areas from the summit

Today the vast areas that were part of the volcano include many mountains and ranges at some distance from Mount Warning, and include the Border Ranges, Tamborine Mountain, the McPherson Range and both the Lamington Plateau and Springbrook Plateaus. The erosion caldera formed since this eruption is easily visible around the summit and forms the rim of the Tweed Valley.

During the last stages of eruption, different and more resistant forms of lava that were cooler than those flows that created the shield volcano remained to form the current peak. The whole central Mount Warning massif was also pushed up by forces that remained active after lava eruptions had stopped.

== Ecology ==
A species of frog, the Mount Wollumbin hip-pocket frog (Assa wollumbin) is endemic to the slopes of the mountain.

== Aboriginal significance ==
Wollumbin is a place of cultural and traditional significance to the Bundjalung people and contains sacred sites, where particular ceremonies and initiation rites are performed. The summit area of the Mountain is a declared Aboriginal Place under the National Parks and Wildlife Act.

While now spelt Wollumbin, the Aboriginal word had numerous alternative spellings which are recorded in the historic record including; Walumban, Walumbin, and Wooloombin, all referring to the same place. In 1873 reference can be found to the Mountain being referred to by Aboriginal people as "Wollumbin", signifying "big fellow mountain". The Aboriginal significance of the area is contextual and dependant on direction of observance, gender, and status of whoever is telling the story. Several different stories exist about Wollumbin including reference to the Mountain as the Warrior Chief, a special place of significance for brush turkey, and the cloud catcher. Many more stories exist that are not in the public record.

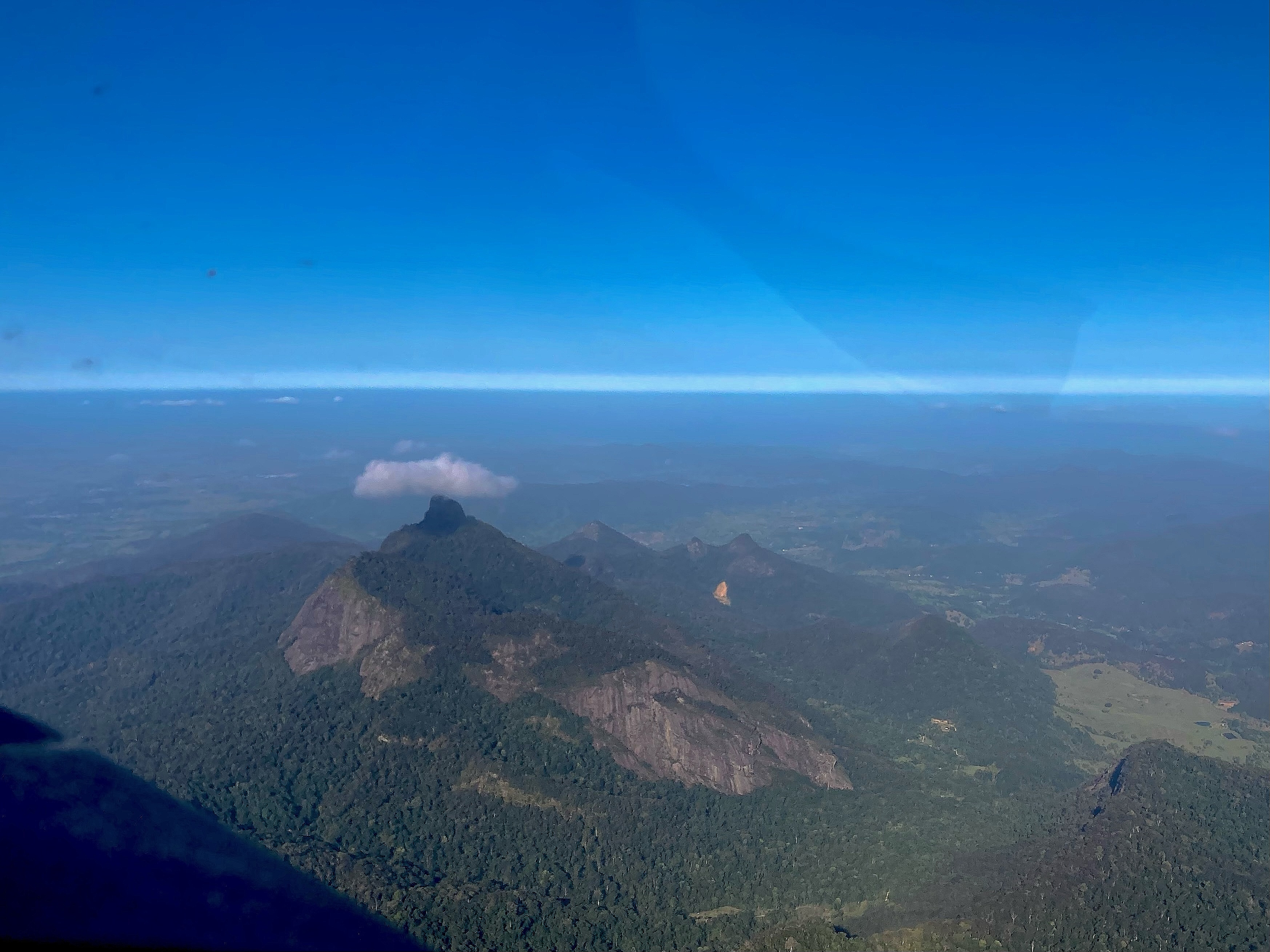
Small cloud over the "cloud catcher", photographed from an aeroplane

The name Wollumbin refers to the whole of the central vent and its surrounding ring dykes.

== Name confusion ==
In 2005 the name "Mount Wollumbin" was removed from a peak nearby to Mount Warning by the Geographical Names Board. This mountain is also referred to as Mount Ivy and Mount Dum Dum and was believed to be named Mount Wollumbin in error. In 2006 the Geographical Names Board assigned dual naming to Mount Warning, to also be known by its Aboriginal language name of Wollumbin. The name Wollumbin refers to the whole of the central vent and its surrounding ring dykes.

The Aboriginal name for Mount Warning is Wollumbin (pronounced Wool-oom-bin). It is a highly sacred site for the Bundjalung Nation, and translations of the name include "cloud catcher" and "fighting chief of the mountains".

== Etymology ==
On 16 May 1770, Captain James Cook was the first European to record seeing "… a remarkable sharp peaked Mountain lying inland…" from a point of land he named Cape Byron. Just five hours later while sailing North, Cook was forced to change course to the East after encountering the dangerous reefs that run 3 miles to the East from Fingal Head, now named Danger Reefs (Inner, South, and Outer reefs).

The next morning, Cook recorded:

We now saw the breakers [reefs] again within us which we past at the distance of 1 League [5 km], they lay in the Lat de of 38°..8' [later changed to 28°..8'] & stretch off East two Leagues [10 km] from a point under which is a small Island. There situation may always be found by the peaked mountain before mentioned which bears SWBW from them this and on this account I have named Mount Warning it lies 7 or 8 Leagues [35-40 km] inland in the latitude of 28°..22" S° the land is high and hilly about it but it is conspicuous enough to be distinguished from everything else. The point off which these shoals lay I have named Point Danger to the northward of it the land which is low trends NWBN but we soon found that it did not keep that direction long before it turned again to the northward.

== Protected area ==
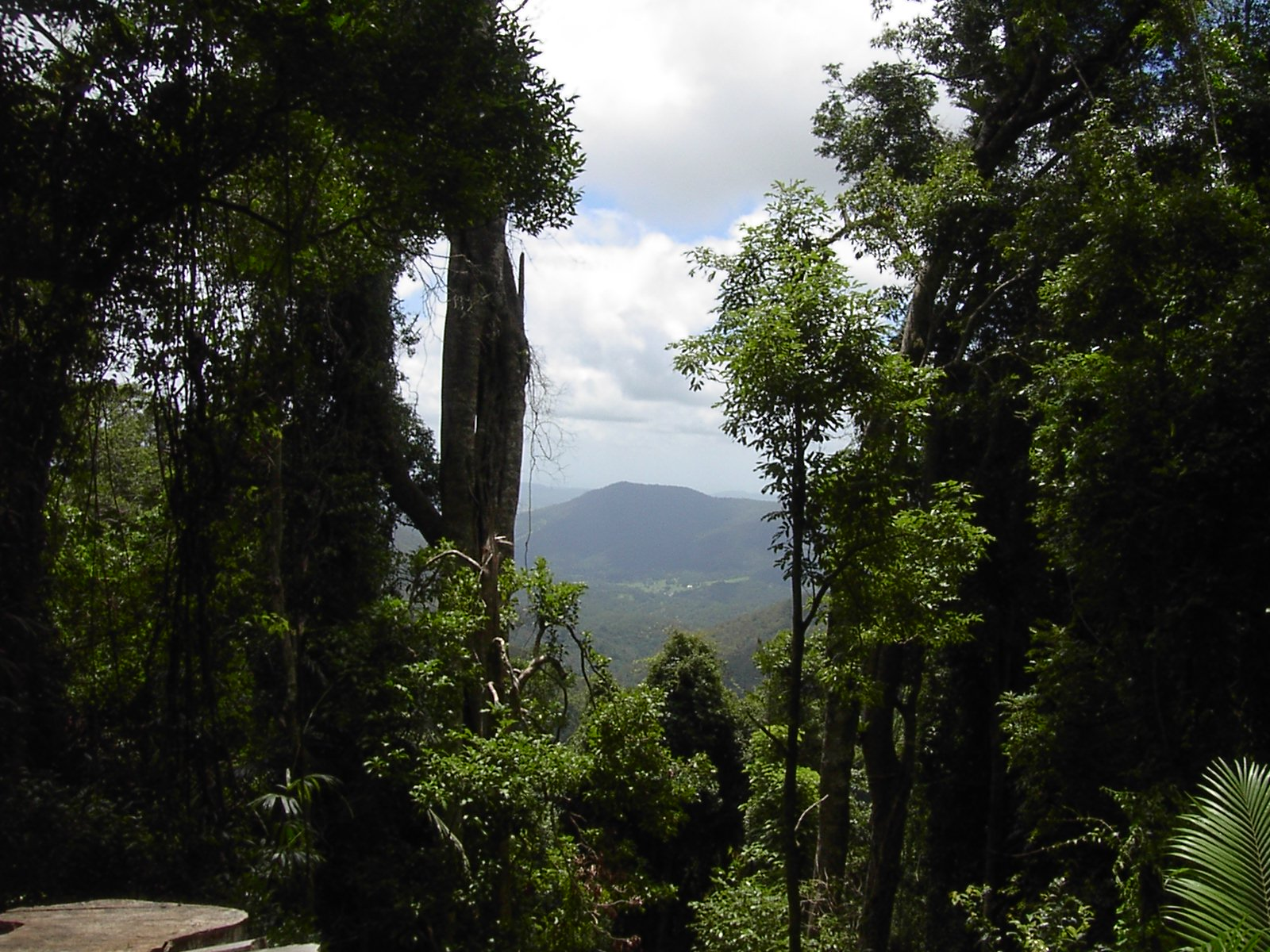
On the path to the summit

The mountain is now protected by the surrounding Wollumbin National Park, and access is regulated by the New South Wales National Parks and Wildlife Service. Mount Warning is part of the United Nations World Heritage-listed Gondwana Rainforests of Australia.

== Walking track ==
Prior to the closure of the summit walking track, over 100,000 people a year made the 8.8-kilometre (5.5 mi), five-hour round-trip trek to the top from Breakfast Creek.

An ascent of the mountain takes approximately 1½ to 3½ hours (one way) and requires a good level of fitness. There are also viewing platforms at the summit. The total journey is 8.8 km (5.5 mi).

In March 2020 the summit track was closed by National Parks NSW citing safety concerns, to be reviewed in May 2021. However, in February 2021 documents obtained through Freedom Of Information revealed that the track and surrounding area has actually been secretly scheduled to be permanently closed. As of August 2022 park authorities had placed a barrier on the access road several kilometres from the trailhead. This would add a forty minute uphill walk to the ascent for anyone attempting to climb the mountain; and the path on the mountain itself had deteriorated badly in places.

In late October 2022 NSW authorities did go ahead and ban public access to Wollumbin National Park, to be enforced with heavy fines. This was soon followed by a video posting showing a hiker flouting the ban. There has been significant backlash in the community surrounding the closure. Many have argued that the track was closed primarily due to complaints from some in the Aboriginal community, not due to safety concerns and the track was in fact still usable.

In 2024, Libertarian politician John Ruddick led a petition to reopen the track which garnered over the required 10,000 signatures to trigger a debate in the New South Wales Legislative Council on 9 May 2024. On 31 October 2024, the neo-Nazi group National Socialist Network posted to X boasting of their recent hike to the summit where while wearing balaclavas they unfurled a banner advocating for white supremacy. NSW Environment Minister Penny Sharpe described the actions as "vile" and "utterly disgusting". The matter has been referred to the police by the National Parks. No one has been charged over the incident.

The summit track and Aboriginal Place are now closed until 30 June 2027, with a prospective reopening scheduled around that time.

== Also see ==
- Bundjalung National Park
- List of mountains of Australia § New South Wales
- List of volcanoes in Australia
