= Elabana Falls =

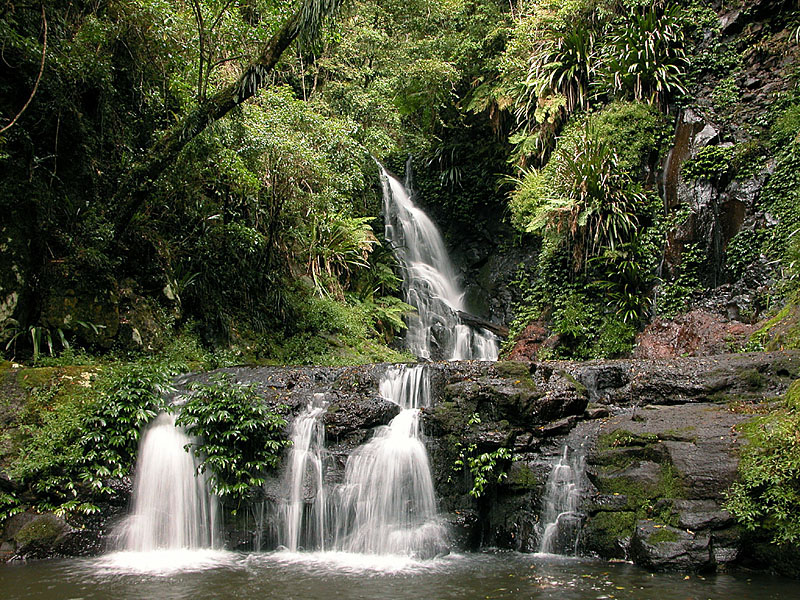
- Elabana Falls

- Location within Queensland
- Location: South East Queensland, Australia
- Coordinates: 28°15′00″S 153°08′59″E
- Type: Cascade

The Elabana Falls is a cascade waterfall that is located within Lamington National Park in the South East region of Queensland, Australia.

== Location and features ==
Access to the falls is via walking tracks from Green Mountains (O'Reilly's), including the Box Forest circuit and the Toolona Creek circuit.

== See also ==
- List of waterfalls
- List of waterfalls in Australia
