= Bar Mountain =

Mountain in New South Wales, Australia

- Location within New South Wales

Highest point
- Elevation: 1,130 m (3,710 ft)
- Coordinates: 28°27′30.60″S 153°7′43.68″E

Geography
- Location: Australia
- Parent range: Tweed Range

Bar Mountain is a mountain in the Tweed Range in the Northern Rivers region of New South Wales, Australia. It is the highest point on the range, rising to 1,130 m (3,710 ft) above sea level.
