= Tweed Range =

Mountains range in New South Wales, Australia

Tweed
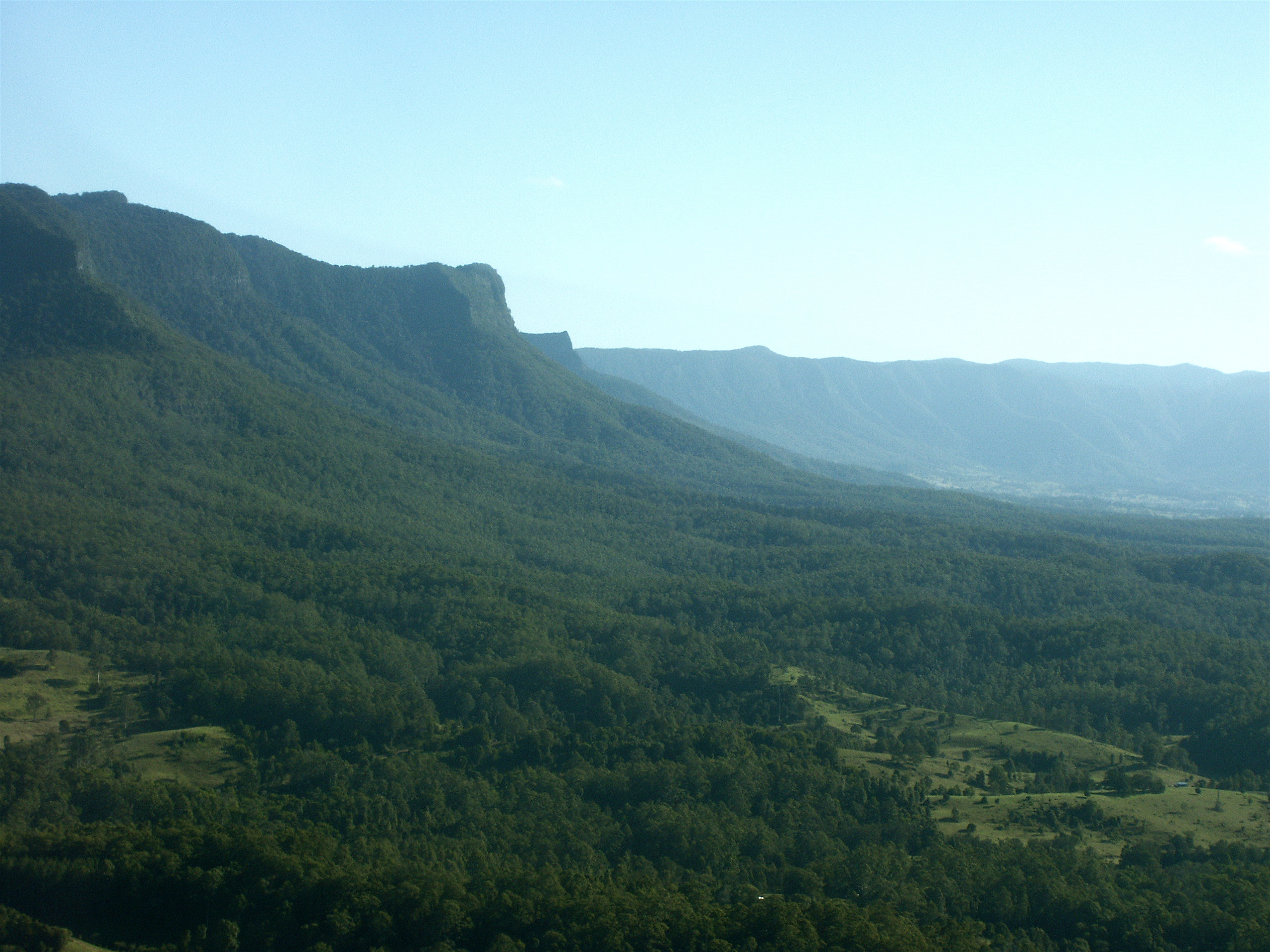
- The forested eastern slopes in the Tweed Valley, below the Tweed Range

Highest point
- Peak: Bar Mountain
- Elevation: 1,130 m (3,710 ft)

Naming
- Etymology: Tweed River

Geography
- Location within New South Wales
- Country: Australia
- State: New South Wales
- Region: Northern Rivers
- Range coordinates: 28°25′S 153°10′E
- Parent range: Scenic Rim

The Tweed Range is a mountain range which is the western extension of the Tweed Volcano caldera rim, part of the Scenic Rim of the Great Dividing Range, located in northern New South Wales, near the southeastern border of Queensland, in Australia.

== Location and features ==
The range marks the southern extent of the Scenic Rim. The Bar Mountain massif is the highest point on the range, rising to 1,130 m (3,710 ft) above sea level. To the west lies McPherson Range and Levers Plateau, in the north is the Lamington Plateau with the Nightcap Range extending around the southern parts of the caldera rim, south east of the Tweed Range.

Most of the range is covered by rainforest and protected within the Border Ranges National Park, part of the Gondwana Rainforests of Australia and Mebbin State Forest. The 64 km (40 mi) long Tweed Range Scenic Drive is a road through the park and along the range that provides access to lookouts over the Tweed Valley, including The Pinnacle Lookout and Blackbutts Lookout.

In the east, the catchments of Byrrill Creek, Oxley River and Rous River, tributaries of the Tweed River drain the steep valley slopes. In the west, a series of creeks, among them Brindle Creek, flow into the Richmond River.

== See also ==
- List of mountains in Australia
