= Limpinwood, New South Wales =

Town in New South Wales, Australia

Coordinates: 28°18′S 153°13′E

Limpinwood
- Town
- Country: Australia
- State: New South Wales
- LGA: Tweed Shire

Government
  - State electorate: Tweed
  - Federal division: Richmond

Population
  - Total: 223 (2011 census)
- Time zone: UTC+10 (AEST)
  - Summer (DST): UTC+11 (AEDT)
- Postcode: 2484

Limpinwood is a town in north-eastern New South Wales, Australia, in the Tweed Shire local government area and it is located 51.5 kilometres (32.0 mi) from the regional centre of Tweed Heads and 21 kilometres (13 mi) from Murwillumbah.

The traditional owners of this place are the Ngandowal and Minyungbal speaking people of the Bundjalung Nation, specifically the Goodjinburra, Tul-gi-gin, and Moorung-Moobah clans.

Limpinwood Nature Reserve is located to the north-west of Limpinwood.

== Origin of place name ==
The town is said to have been named for "Hopping Jack" Wood (also recorded as Dick Wood), an early settler who camped in what is now known as Limpinwood regularly; it was first known as "Hopping Wood" and "Hopping Dick" after him. Wood worked as a timber gathering in the local forestry industry and he is said to have had a heavy limp and potentially walked with the use of a wooded leg.

The first school in the town was, between 1910 and 1913, known as Hopping Dick Provisional School until it was changed to Limpinwood Public School. This school closed in 1974.

== Demographics ==
In the 2011 census, Limpinwood recorded a population of 223 people, 53.4% female and 46.6% male.

The median age of the Limpinwood population was 49 years, 12 years above the national median of 37.

81.6% of people living in Limpinwood were born in Australia. The other top responses for country of birth were England 6.7%, Hungary 2.2%, 9.5% other countries.

92.4% of people spoke only English at home; the next most common language was French, at 1.3%, with 6.3% speaking other languages.
