= Box Log Falls =

Waterfall in Queensland, Australia

- Location within Queensland
- Location: Lamington National Park, Australia
- Coordinates: 28°14′31″S 153°09′12″E
- Type: Horsetail
- Number of drops: 1
- Watercourse: West Canungra Creek

Box Log Falls is a large waterfall on West Canungra Creek, a tributary of the Logan River, in Queensland, Australia. The waterfall is located within the Green Mountains section of Lamington National Park, in the Scenic Rim Region, near the resort village of O'Reillys. Like other waterfalls in the area, Box Log Falls is surrounded by dense rainforest, especially a large brush box stand.

== Namesake ==
"Box Log" refers to a large stand of brush box trees that are found close to the falls. The Aboriginal name for the falls is Tullerigumai, which is from the Bundjalung language, meaning 'log big'.

== Access ==
The falls are accessible by the 10.9 km maintained Box Forest Circuit walking track from O'Reillys. The track is unsuitable for wheelchairs and bicycles, and is a medium-steep level on foot. There are many other waterfalls along the circuit.

== See also ==
- List of waterfalls
- List of waterfalls in Australia
