= Gondwana Rainforests =

Area of subtropical rainforest in Australia

Gondwana Rainforests of Australia
UNESCO World Heritage Site
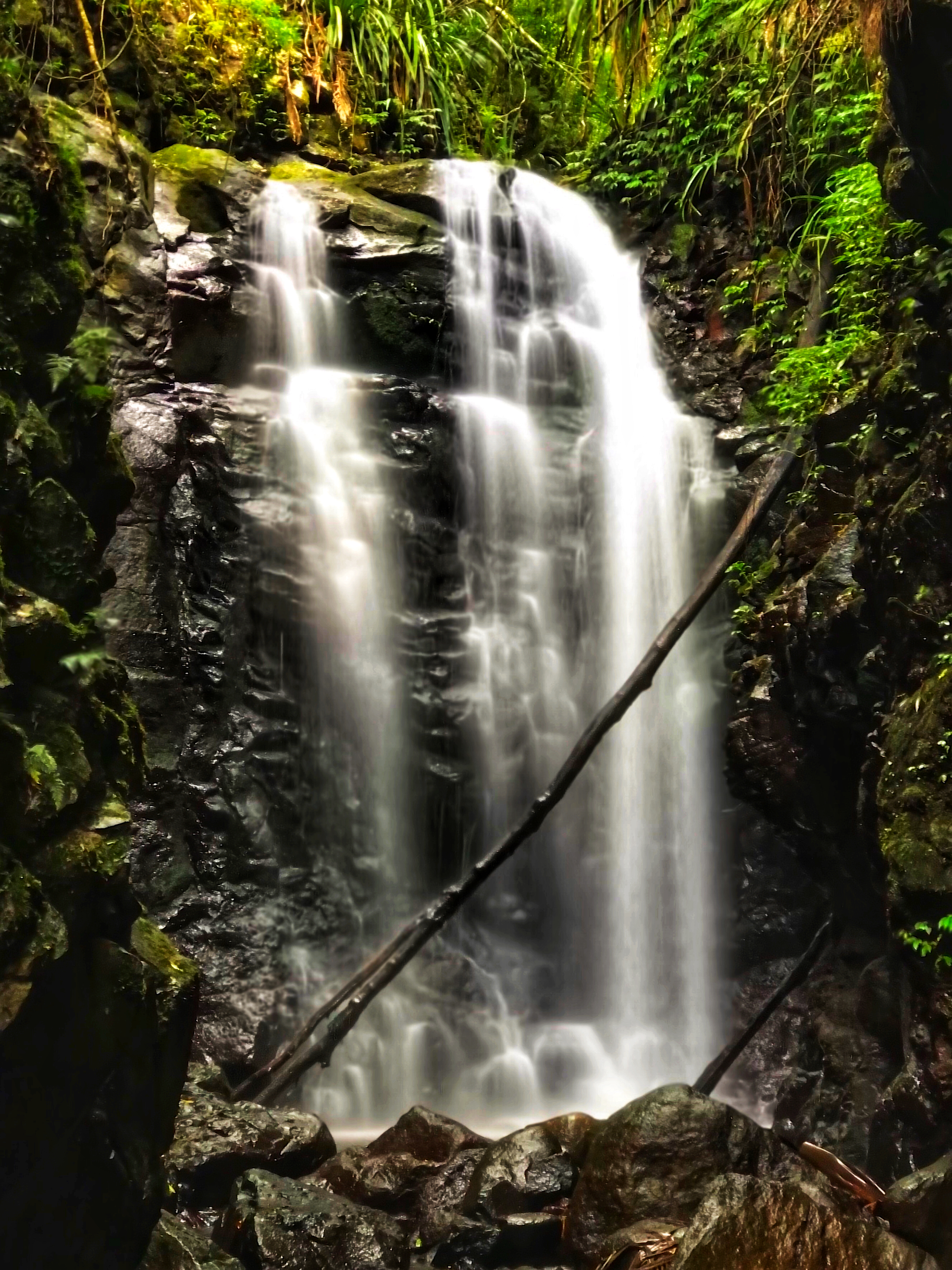
- Box Log Falls, Lamington National Park in Queensland
- Location: New South Wales and Queensland, Australia
- Criteria: Natural: viii, ix, x
- Reference: 368
- Inscription: 1986 (10th Session)
- Extensions: 1994
- Area: 370,000 ha (1,400 sq mi)

Australian National Heritage List
- Type: National Heritage (Landscape)
- Designated: 15 May 2007
- Reference no.: 105135
- Class: Natural

New South Wales Heritage Register
- Type: State Heritage (Landscape)
- Designated: 2 April 1999
- Reference no.: 1002
- Type: Wilderness
- Category: Natural

The Gondwana Rainforests of Australia, formerly known as the Central Eastern Rainforest Reserves, are a World Heritage Site, encompassing 41 rainforest reserves with a total area of approximately 370,000 ha (910,000 acres) in north-east New South Wales and south-east Queensland. The site was added to the World Heritage List in 1986 and was expanded in 1994. The Gondwana Rainforests are also listed on the Australian National Heritage List and the New South Wales Heritage Register.

The Gondwana Rainforests are home to a number of plant and animal species whose lineages trace back to before the separation of the landmass Gondwana, some of which are only found in the region. These include early examples of ferns, conifers, and flowering plants. The reserves that make up the site are among the last remaining examples of the rainforests that covered most of Australia at the time of its separation from Gondwana. The Gondwana Rainforests are the world's most significant subtropical rainforests and include almost all of the world's Antarctic beech cool temperate rainforests.

== History ==
Australia separated from the landmass Gondwana about 180 million years ago, at which point most of the continent was covered in rainforests. These rainforests receded as the continent travelled north, and by 1788, just 1% of Australia was covered by rainforests. These rainforests were used by Aboriginal Australians for varied purposes, including as a site for ceremonial activities, as a source of food and shelter, and as a refuge from European settlement. Australia's remaining rainforests were heavily affected by logging following European colonisation, which led to the destruction of a further 75% of the rainforests that had been present in 1788.

In 1986, the Central Eastern Rainforest Reserves (Australia) were inscribed onto the World Heritage List at the tenth session of the World Heritage Committee. The site was deemed to meet criteria 8 (displaying significant ongoing geological processes), criteria 9 (displaying significant ongoing ecological and biological processes), and criteria 10 (containing significant natural habitats of conservation significance) of the selection criteria for natural sites. The borders of the World Heritage Site were expanded in 1994, increasing its total area by 35%. In 2007, the site's name was changed to the Gondwana Rainforests of Australia. Australia added a further expansion of the site to its Tentative List in 2010.

The Gondwana Rainforests of Australia were added to the Australian National Heritage List on 15 May 2007 and to the New South Wales Heritage Register on 2 April 1999. The site receives around 2 million visitors each year, and many of the rainforest reserves contain visitor facilities and walking trails. The Gondwana Rainforests are primarily managed by the Queensland Parks and Wildlife Service and by the New South Wales National Parks and Wildlife Service.

== Features and conservation ==
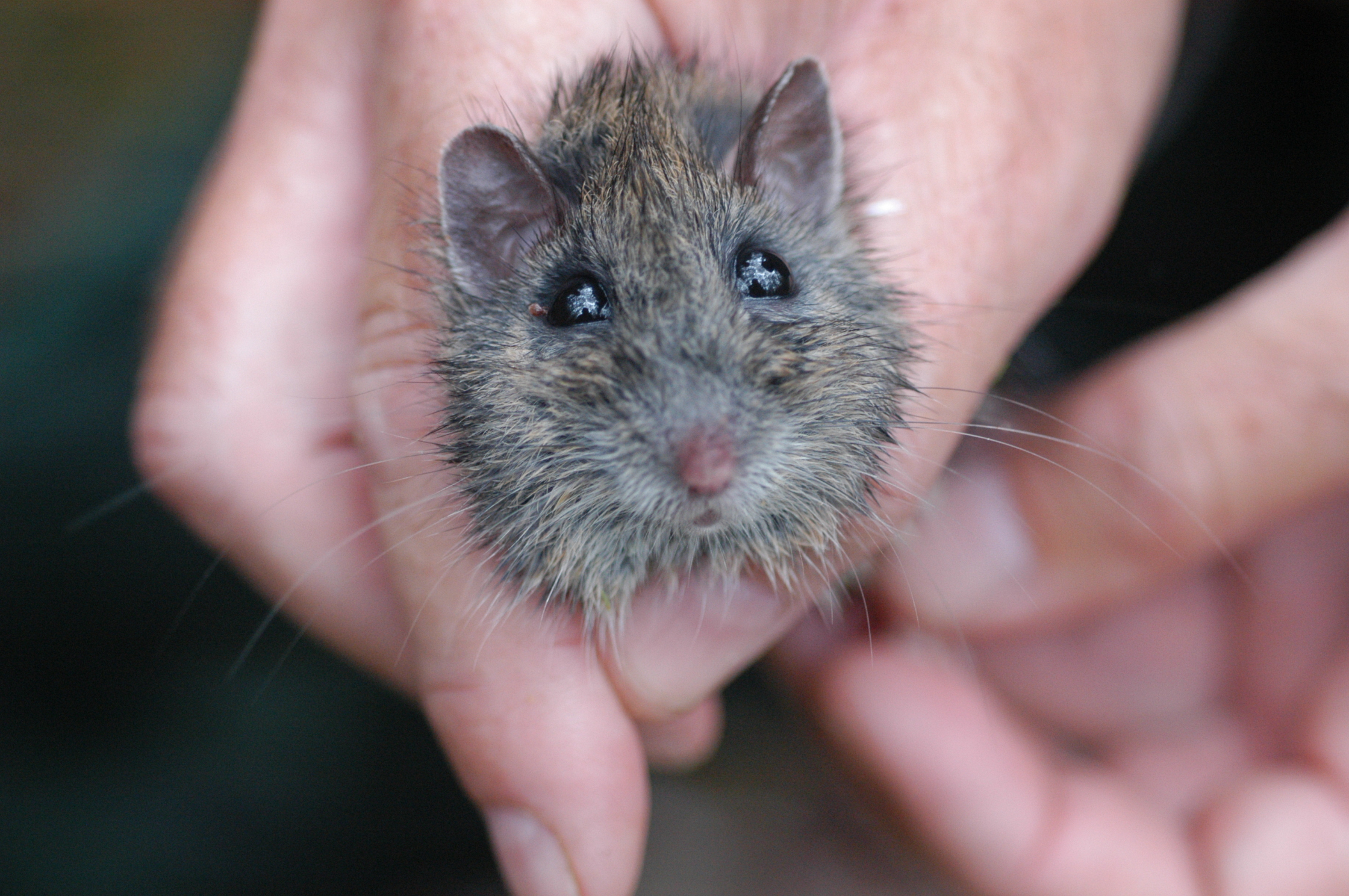
The threatened Hastings River mouse, previously thought to be extinct, was rediscovered in the Gondwana Rainforests.

The reserves that make up the Gondwana Rainforests are home to more than 200 rare and threatened species and are a habitat for large populations of marsupials, birds, snakes, and frogs. About 45 species of frog, 110 species of reptile, and 270 species of bird have been recorded in the area. Plant species of conservation significance in the Gondwana Rainforests include species of Cryptocarya, Tasmannia, and Endiandra. The site also contains the remains of two extinct volcanoes: the Tweed Shield Volcano—described as among the world's best preserved erosion calderas—and the Ebor Volcano.

The Gondwana Rainforests were severely damaged by the 2019–2020 Australian bushfire season, which affected about 53% of the site's land area. The parma wallaby, Hastings River mouse, rufous scrubbird, and nightcap oak were among the species most heavily impacted by the fires. Ongoing threats to the Gondwana Rainforests include weeds and invasive species, including myrtle rust and bitou bush, pathogens, and climate change.

== Sites ==
Gondwana Rainforests
Name	UNESCO ID	State	Coordinates	Area
Border Ranges National Park	368-001	New South Wales	29°39′13″S 152°53′17″E	31,229 ha (77,170 acres)
Limpinwood Nature Reserve	368-002	New South Wales	28°17′51″S 153°10′51″E	2,646 ha (6,540 acres)
Numinbah Nature Reserve	368-003	New South Wales	28°14′37″S 153°17′13″E	858 ha (2,120 acres)
Mount Nothofagus Flora Reserve	368-004	New South Wales	28°17′30″S 152°36′37″E	650 ha (1,600 acres)
Mount Warning National Park	368-005	New South Wales	28°23′38″S 153°16′14″E	2,380 ha (5,900 acres)
Nightcap National Park	368-006	New South Wales	28°32′24″S 153°16′56″E	1,110 ha (2,700 acres)
Washpool National Park	368-007	New South Wales	29°22′21″S 152°20′5″E	27,715 ha (68,490 acres)
Gibraltar Range National Park	368-008	New South Wales	29°27′31″S 152°21′25″E	17,273 ha (42,680 acres)
Iluka Nature Reserve	368-009	New South Wales	29°24′14″S 153°21′44″E	136 ha (340 acres)
New England National Park	368-010	New South Wales	30°28′19″S 152°28′55″E	29,985 ha (74,090 acres)
Dorrigo National Park (part)	368-011	New South Wales	30°21′9″S 152°48′26″E	7,885 ha (19,480 acres)
Mount Hyland Nature Reserve	368-012	New South Wales	30°9′49″S 152°26′28″E	1,636 ha (4,040 acres)
Werrikimbe National Park	368-013	New South Wales	31°9′59″S 152°15′11″E	35,178 ha (86,930 acres)
Mount Seaview Nature Reserve	368-014	New South Wales	31°20′5″S 152°11′1″E	1,703 ha (4,210 acres)
Willi Willi National Park	368-015	New South Wales	31°8′47″S 152°25′31″E	1,610 ha (4,000 acres)
Barrington Tops National Park	368-016	New South Wales	31°56′11″S 151°29′11″E	39,120 ha (96,700 acres)
Springbrook National Park (part)	368-017	Queensland	28°12′23″S 153°17′46″E	2,480 ha (6,100 acres)
Lamington National Park	368-018	Queensland	28°8′45″S 153°6′50″E	20,500 ha (51,000 acres)
Mount Chinghee National Park	368-019	Queensland	28°18′3″S 152°56′51″E	1,110 ha (2,700 acres)
Mount Barney National Park (part)	368-020	Queensland	28°16′49″S 152°39′36″E	9,710 ha (24,000 acres)
Main Range National Park	368-021	Queensland	27°54′7″S 152°19′8″E	11,500 ha (28,000 acres)
Mount Mistake National Park (part)	368-022	Queensland	27°51′46″S 152°21′6″E	11,500 ha (28,000 acres)
Turtle Rock Environmental Park	368-023	Queensland	28°11′53″S 153°13′4″E	68.8 ha (170 acres)
Telemon Environmental Park	368-024	Queensland	28°9′0″S 152°55′35″E	146.6 ha (362 acres)
Goomburra State Forest	368-025	Queensland	27°58′40″S 152°21′5″E	2,067 ha (5,110 acres)
Spicers Gap State Forest	368-026	Queensland	28°4′30″S 152°24′38″E	257 ha (640 acres)
Gilbert State Forest	368-027	Queensland	28°6′58″S 152°22′16″E	84 ha (210 acres)
Emu Vale State Forest	368-028	Queensland	26°16′18″S 149°25′47″E	268 ha (660 acres)
Gambubal State Forest	368-029	Queensland	28°13′59″S 152°21′55″E	2,260 ha (5,600 acres)
Teviot State Forest	368-030	Queensland	28°13′8″S 152°28′26″E	390 ha (960 acres)
Killarney State Forest	368-031	New South Wales	30°14′6″S 149°51′46″E	494 ha (1,220 acres)
Burnett Creek State Forest	368-032	Queensland	28°14′26″S 152°35′5″E	1,076 ha (2,660 acres)
Cronan Creek State Forest	368-033	Queensland	28°18′9″S 152°41′42″E	795 ha (1,960 acres)
Palen Creek State Forest	368-034	Queensland	28°16′28″S 152°48′39″E	326 ha (810 acres)
Rabbitt Board Paddock Reserves	368-035	Queensland	26°51′39″S 150°47′51″E	143 ha (350 acres)
Prison Purposes Land	368-036a	Queensland	—	48 ha (120 acres)
Wilsons Peak Flora Reserve	368-037	New South Wales	28°14′53″S 152°29′15″E	185 ha (460 acres)
Mount Clunie Flora Reserve	368-038	New South Wales	28°14′26″S 152°35′5″E	485 ha (1,200 acres)
Amaroo Flora Reserve	368-039	New South Wales	28°22′51″S 153°14′5″E	36 ha (89 acres)
Fenwicks Scrub Flora Reserve	368-040	New South Wales	31°16′58″S 152°8′48″E	110 ha (270 acres)
Kerripit Beech Flora Reserve	368-041	New South Wales	32°1′54″S 151°33′4″E	243 ha (600 acres)

== Maps ==
Location of sites in Queensland	Location of sites in New South Wales

== See also ==
- Forests of Australia
- List of World Heritage Sites in Australia
- Temperate and subtropical rainforests of New South Wales
