= Lamington National Park =

National park in Queensland, Australia

- IUCN category II (national park)
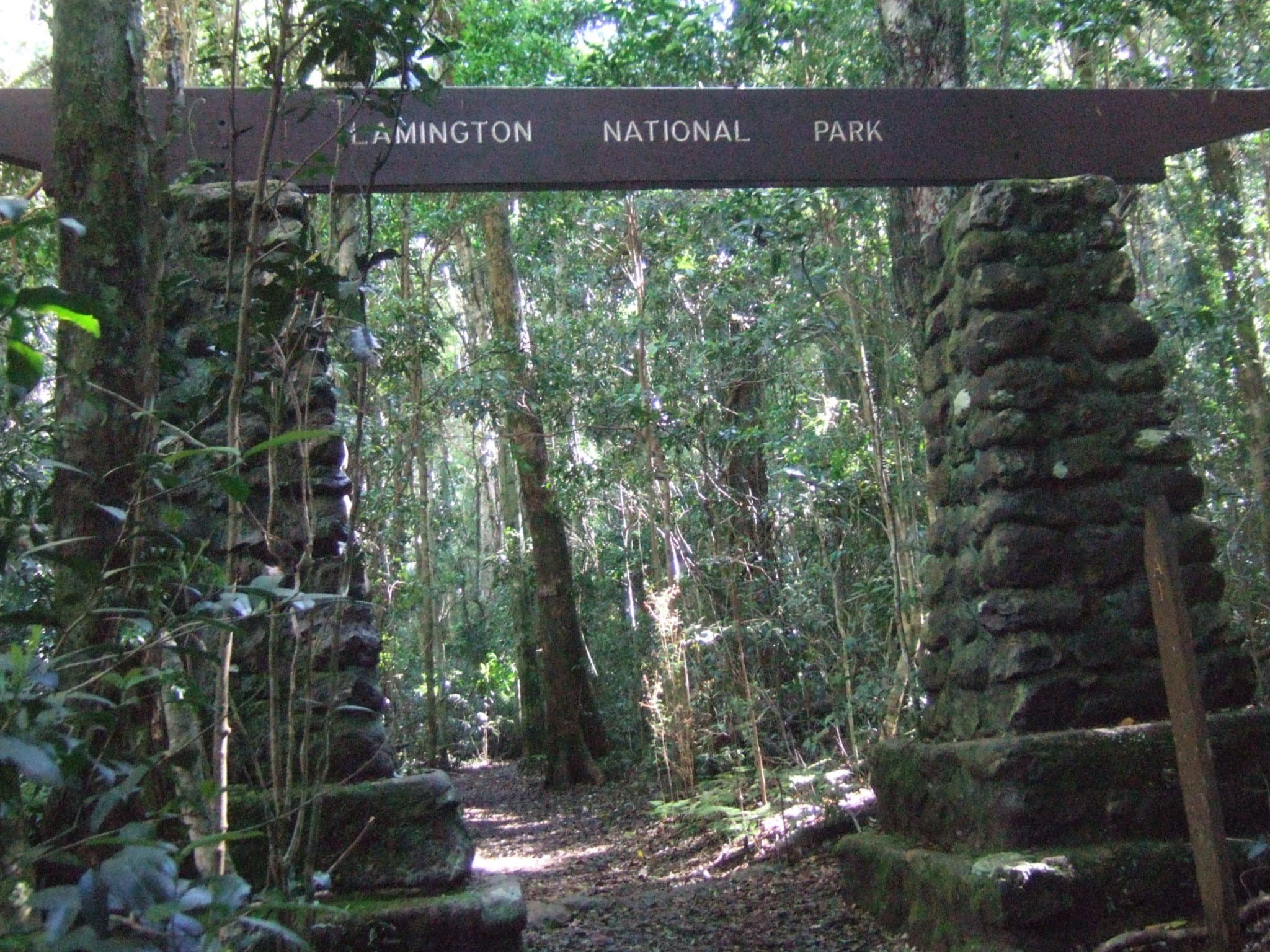
- Entrance to the trail network at Binna Burra

- Location within Queensland
- Location: Queensland
- Nearest city: Canungra
- Coordinates: 28°8′32″S 153°6′55″E
- Area: 206 km^{2} (80 sq mi)
- Established: July 1915
- Visitors: 1,214,000 (domestic visitors only) (in 2012)
- Governing body: Queensland Parks and Wildlife Service
- Website: Official website

The Lamington National Park is a national park in the McPherson Range on the Queensland/New South Wales border in Australia. From Southport on the Gold Coast the park is 85 kilometres (53 mi) to the southwest and Brisbane is 110 kilometres (68 mi) north. The 20,600 hectares (51,000 acres) Lamington National Park is known for its natural environment, rainforests, birdlife, ancient trees, waterfalls, walking tracks and mountain views. The park protects parts of the Eastern Australian temperate forests.

Protected areas to the east in Springbrook National Park and south along the Tweed Range in the Border Ranges National Park around Mount Warning in New South Wales conserve similar landscapes. The park is part of the Shield Volcano Group of the World Heritage Site Gondwana Rainforests of Australia inscribed in 1986 and added to the Australian National Heritage List in 2007. The park is part of the Scenic Rim Important Bird Area, identified as such by BirdLife International because of its importance in the conservation of several species of threatened birds.

In 2009 as part of the Q150 celebrations, the Lamington National Park was announced as one of the Q150 Icons of Queensland for its role as a "Natural attraction".

== Geography ==
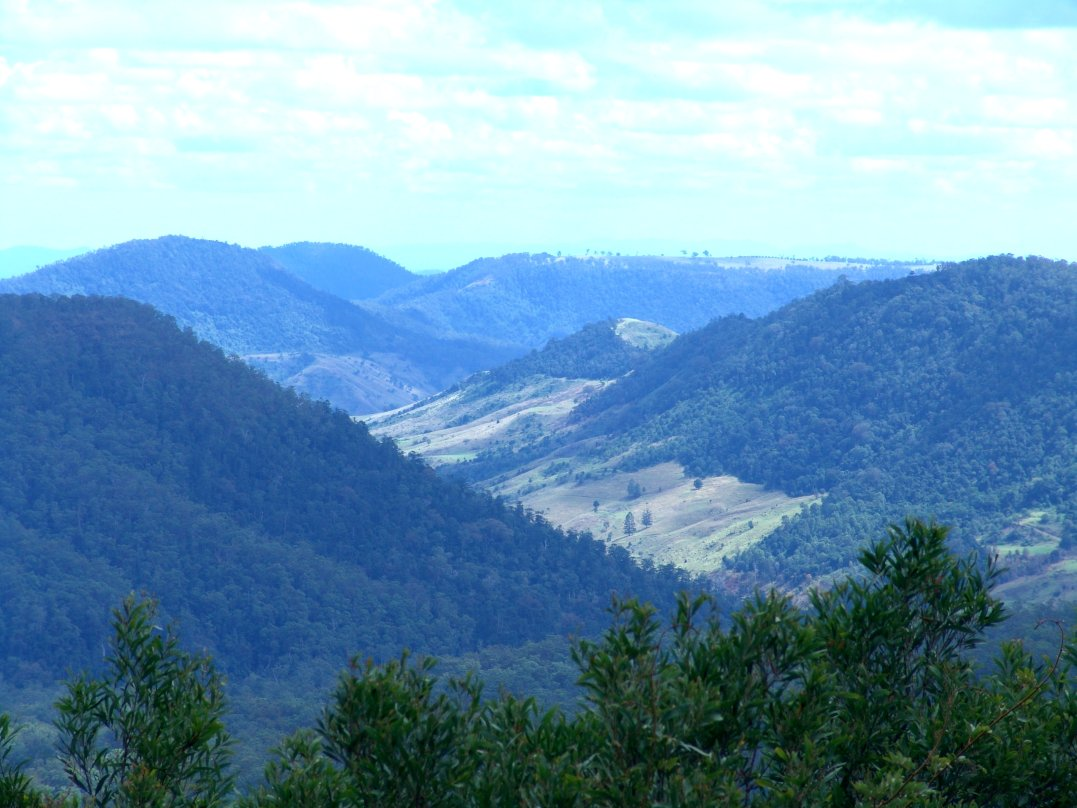
View north to Beechmont from Binna Burra, 2005.

Most of the park is situated 900 metres (3,000 ft) above sea level only 30 kilometres (19 mi) from the Pacific's ocean shores. The plateaus and cliffs in Lamington and Springbrook National Parks are the northern and north western remnants of the huge 23-million-year-old Tweed Volcano, centred around Mount Warning. Elevation in the south of the park is above 1,000 metres (3,300 ft) in some parts. The land declines to under 700 metres (2,300 ft) in the north. Some of the mountains in the park include Mount Hobwee, Mount Widgee, Mount Toolona, Mount Cominan, Mount Roberts and Mount Bithongabel, containing much of Australia's few cloud forests. The Nerang River, Albert River and Coomera River all have their source in Lamington National Park. Eastern parts of the park feature high cliffs which rise above the Numinbah Valley. The park is within the City of Gold Coast and Scenic Rim Region local government areas. Southern Lamington and sections of O'Reilly, Binna Burra and Natural Bridge are protected with Lamington National Park.

== History ==
For at least 6,000 years, Aboriginal people lived in and visited these mountains. The Wangerriburras and Nerangballum tribes claimed home to the plateau territory. Bushrangers Cave, which is close to Mount Hobwee and is 60 metres (200 ft) long, was once an aboriginal camp. This site shows Aboriginal occupation going back 10,000 years.

Captain Patrick Logan and Allan Cunningham were the first European explorers in the area. The timber cutters soon followed, including the Lahey family who owned one of Queensland's largest timber mills at the time. In 1863 a survey of the Queensland/New South Wales border was conducted. The task was carried out by Francis Edward Roberts and Isaiah Rowland, both surveyors, who had to define the border along the highest points in dense rainforest where there were very few clear lines of sight.

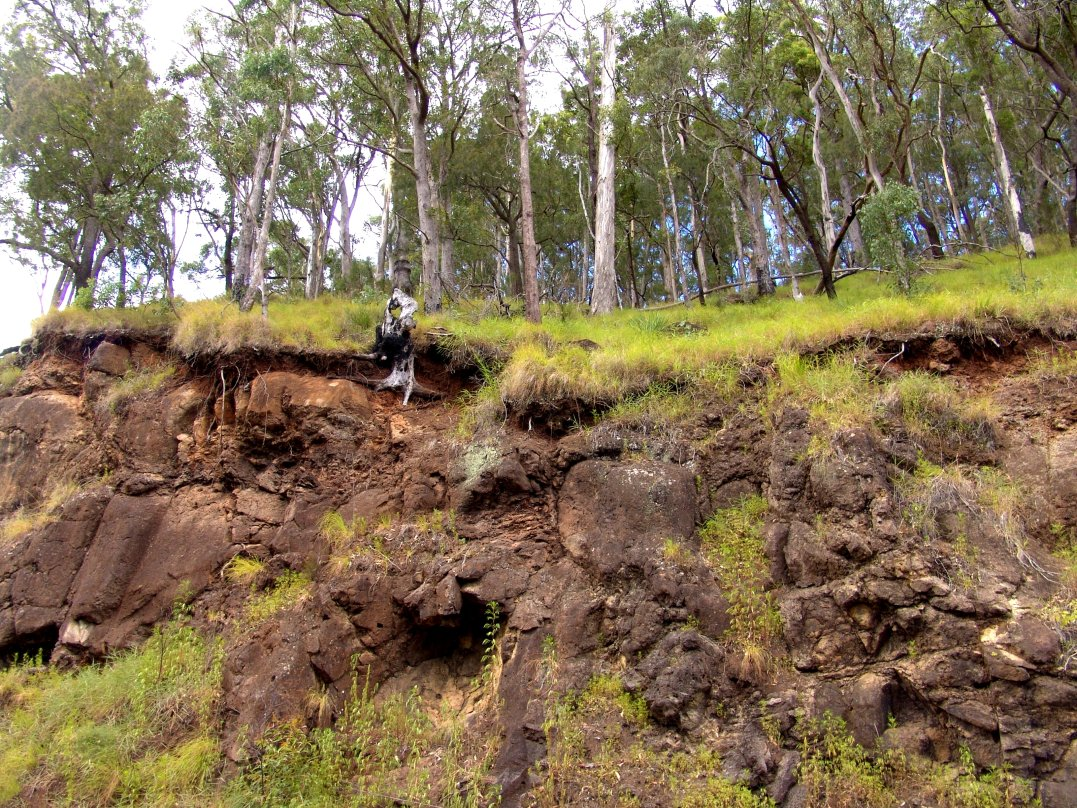
Exposed volcanic rocks, 2005.

Robert Collins campaigned heavily for the protection of the area from logging from the 1890s. Collins entered state parliament and saw a bill passed that preserved state forests and national parks but he died before the McPherson Range was protected. Later it was another local, Romeo Lahey who recognised the value of preserving the forests. He campaigned to make it one of the first protected areas in Queensland. The O’Reilly family established a guesthouse near the park in 1926, now named O'Reilly's Rainforest Retreat. Lahey wanted the O'Reillys to cease land clearing, for their land to be bought and for the O'Reilly family to leave the mountain. Lamington National Park was established in 1915. The park was named after Lord Lamington, Governor of Queensland from 1896 to 1902.

Founding members of the National Parks Association of Queensland built Binna Burra Lodge next to the park in the 1930s. In 1937, Bernard O'Reilly became a hero when he rescued the survivors from the Airlines of Australia Stinson Model A airliner City of Brisbane, which had crashed in the remote Lamington wilderness. In typical Australian bushman fashion he embarked on his rescue mission taking only onions and bread to eat. Only a small portion of the original wreck remains today, 10 km (6.2 miles) south of the O'Reilly's guesthouse.

In 2019, bushfires burnt holes in the rainforest canopy. Prolific weed growth occurs in these gaps. Weed eradication programs have been funded by the federal government. The Queensland Conservation Council has commissioned research showing significant funding is required to maintain the Gondwana Rainforests of Main Range. Water bombing planes were used to subdue fires in the national park.

== Natural heritage ==
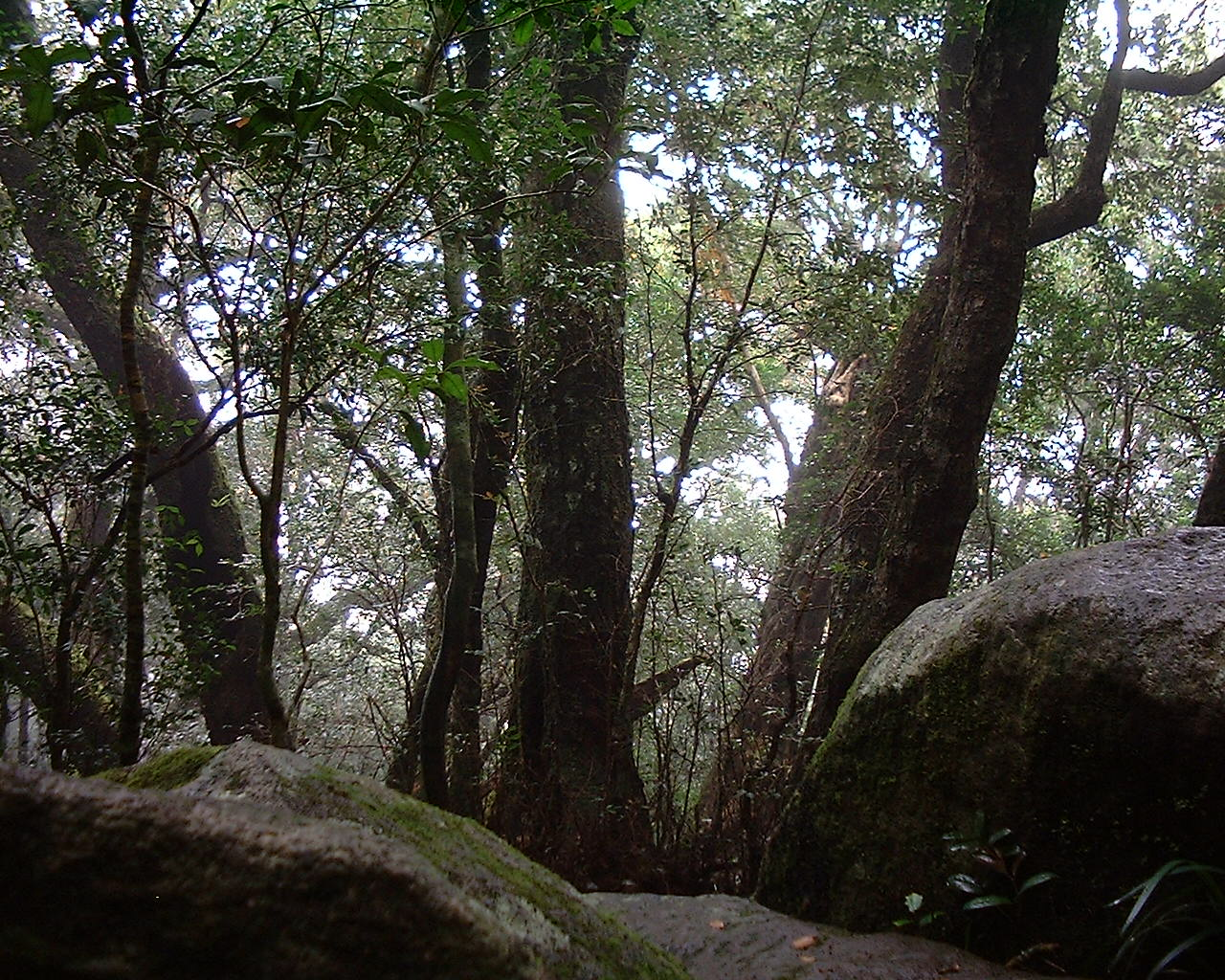
Antarctic beech trees only grow above 1,000 metres (3,300 ft), 2001.

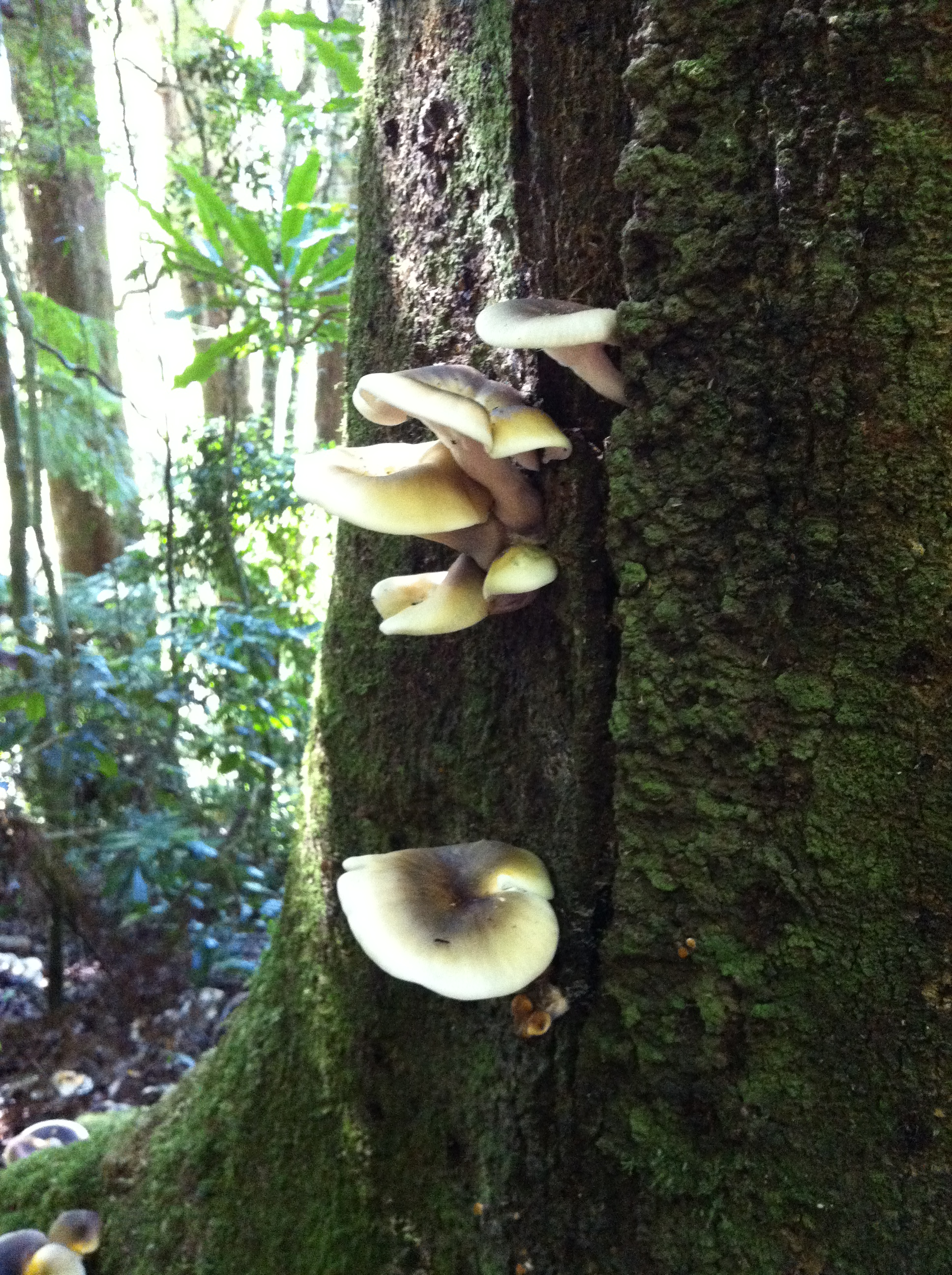
Fungus – Green Mountains area

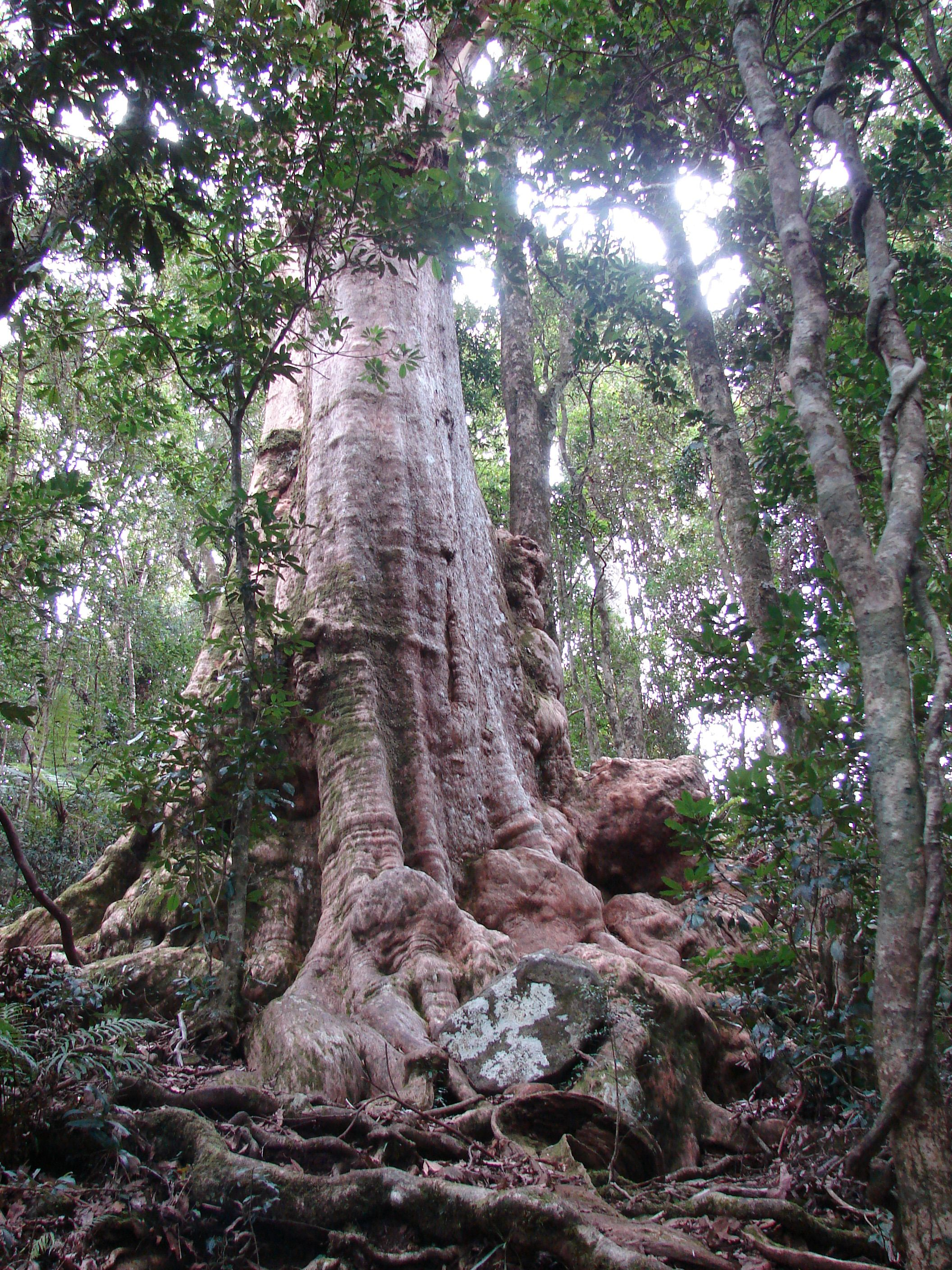
Brush box

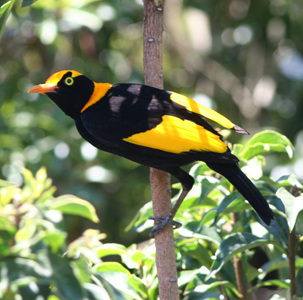
A regent bowerbird, an example of the diverse range of birds in the park, renowned to birdwatchers, 2006.

Rugged mountain scenery, waterfalls, caves, rainforest, wildflower heaths, tall open forests, creeks, varied wildlife and excellent bushwalking in Queensland are protected in Lamington National Park. Lamington is the core of the Gondwana Rainforests of Australia World Heritage Area along the adjoining Border Ranges National Park in New South Wales. The park is home to more than 200 rare and threatened plant and animal species.

David Attenborough visited and filmed the park while making the 1979 television series Life on Earth in which beech trees and bowerbirds were featured.

=== Flora ===
The national park protects one of the most diverse areas of vegetation in the country. The park's lush rainforests include one of the largest upland subtropical rainforest remnants in the world and the most northern Antarctic beech cool temperate rainforests in Australia. The roots of the oldest Antarctic beech trees are over 5,000 years old. Around Mount Widgee numbers of Antarctic beech appear to be increasing. The park protects one of the country's largest remaining forests of hoop pine (Araucaria cunninghamii) which are found on the drier slopes.

Below 880 metres (2,890 ft) the white booyong and black booyong are commonly found. In higher elevations the yellow carabeen, red carabeen, pigeonberry ash, rosewood and soft corkwood trees predominate.

Many of Lamington's plants are found nowhere else on earth, such as the Mt Merino eyebright and Everlasting Daisy which are subalpine relics from the last ice age. In 2006 it was realised that an old collection of the eastern underground orchid (Rhizanthella slateri) from Lamington was actually a separate species and has been described as the Lamington underground orchid (Rhizanthella omissa). This orchid, like the two other related species, has no chlorophyll and depends entirely upon a symbiotic fungus for survival. It is also one of only four flowering plants on Earth to complete its life cycle entirely underground. Sadly, one of Lamington's more than 100 fern species is now presumed extinct; Antrophyum austroqueenslandicum was known from only a single plant which has since died and no other plants have been found. Lamington is also home to a large number of threatened plant species such as the ravine and blotched Sarchochilus orchids. Strangler figs are also found in Lamington.

=== Fauna ===
The area is one of the most important wildlife refuges in the region. Lamington is home to an incredible variety of wildlife including rare and threatened animals such as the Coxen's fig parrot, eastern bristlebird, Albert's lyrebird, Richmond birdwing butterfly. The blue Lamington crayfish is found only on the Lamington plateau in pools and streams above an elevation of 450 metres (1,480 ft). In damp conditions, they also move about the forest floor. The vulnerable large-eared pied bat is found in the park. Other rare species include the rainforest cool-skink, elf skink and numerous frog species including the Fleay's barred frog, giant barred frog and the cascade treefrog. Red-necked pademelons can be seen near the edges of the rainforest and platypus may be spotted in the deeper rock pools. The regent bowerbird and the crimson rosella are often seen in Lamington.

The beetle Lamingtonium binnaberrense, the only species in the genus Lamingtonium, is found in Lamington National Park.

=== Geology ===
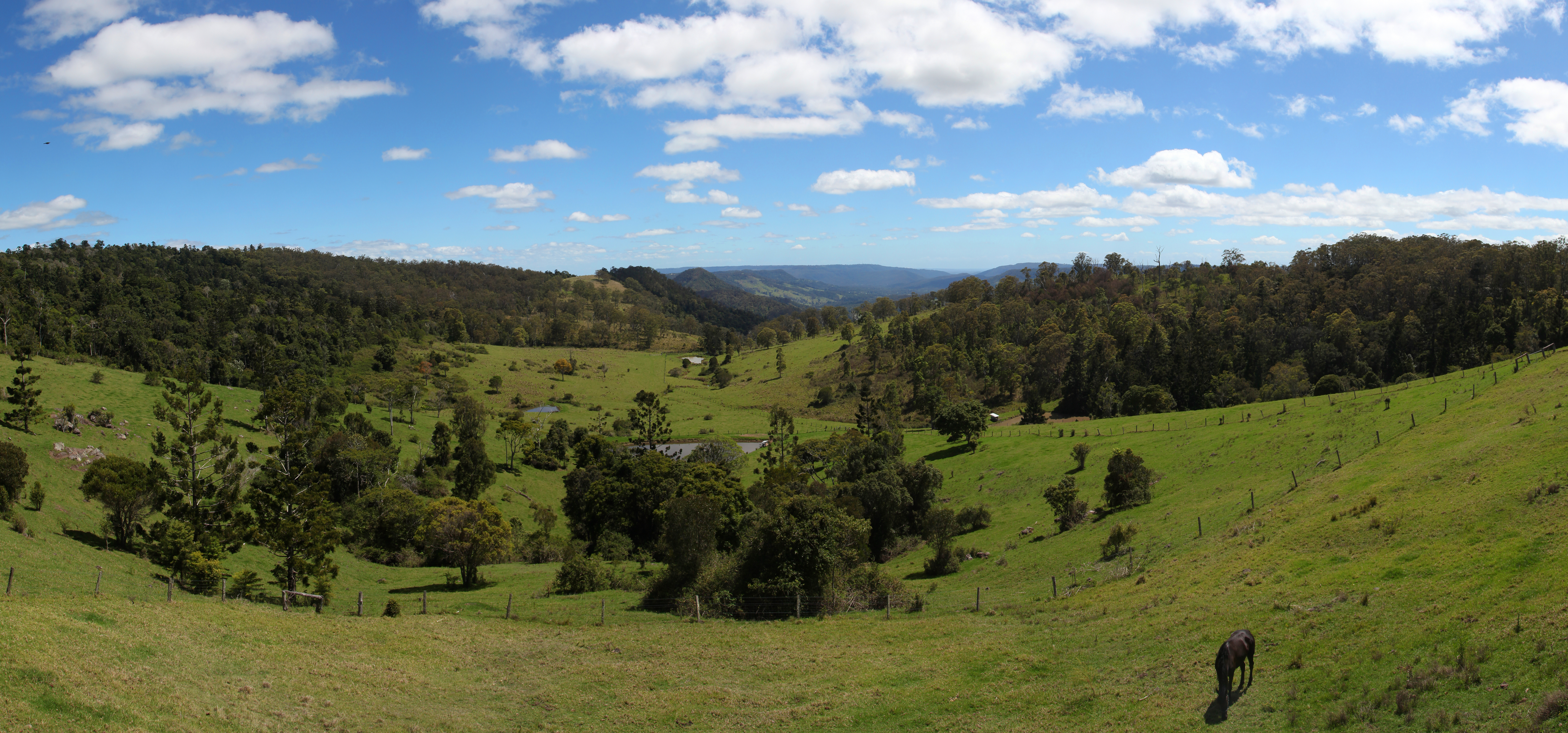
Green Mountain Valley

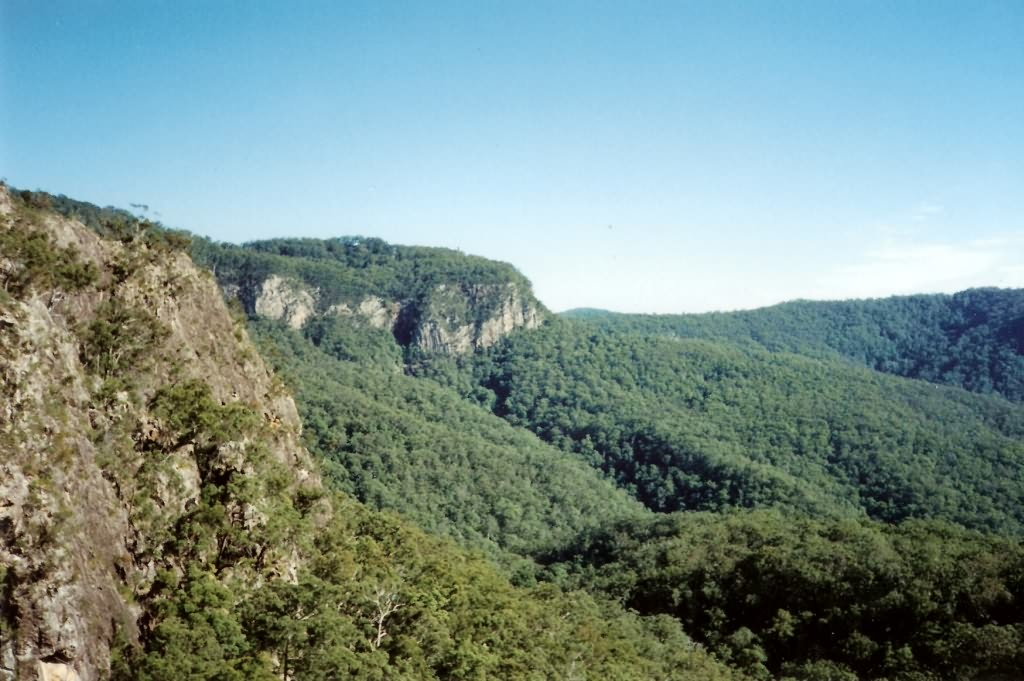
The view from a lookout on the 19-kilometre (12 mi) long Ships Stern Circuit.

The Lamington National Park is located on the northern side of the Tweed volcano. This large shield volcano is over 100 kilometres in diameter, and extends from Tamborine Mountain in the north to Lismore in the south. The volcanic plug of Mount Warning marks the centre of the volcano. This volcano was active around 23 million years ago when this part of Australia was above a hotspot in the mantle. Both basaltic and rhyolitic lavas were erupted, and erosion of these lavas from rain and running water has formed the many spectacular landforms including cliffs, now observed in the park. Under these layers is a layer of tuff made from volcanic ash and fine rock which is up to 60 metres (200 ft) thick in some places. The basalts of the Lamington Plateau originate from the Focal Point volcano. Near Binna Burra the maximum thickness of the basalt layer is estimated to be 700 metres (2,300 ft).

=== Waterfalls ===
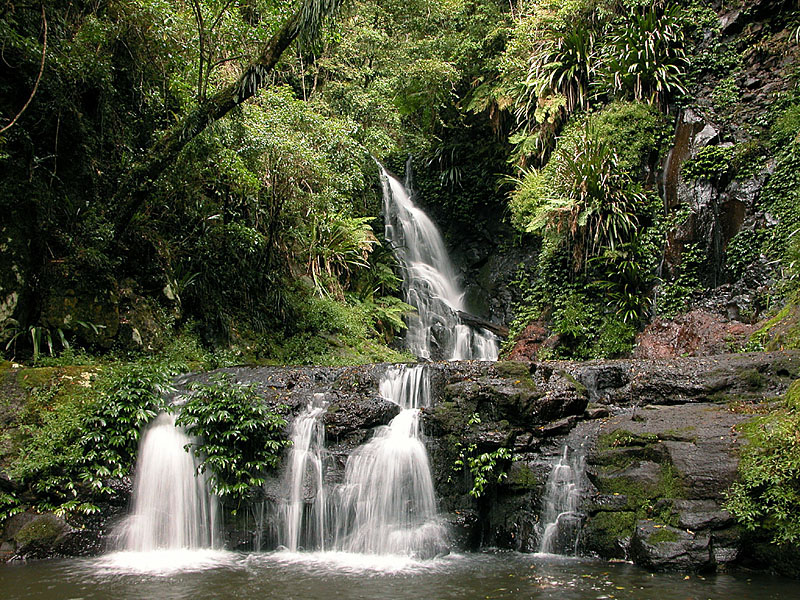
Elabana Falls.

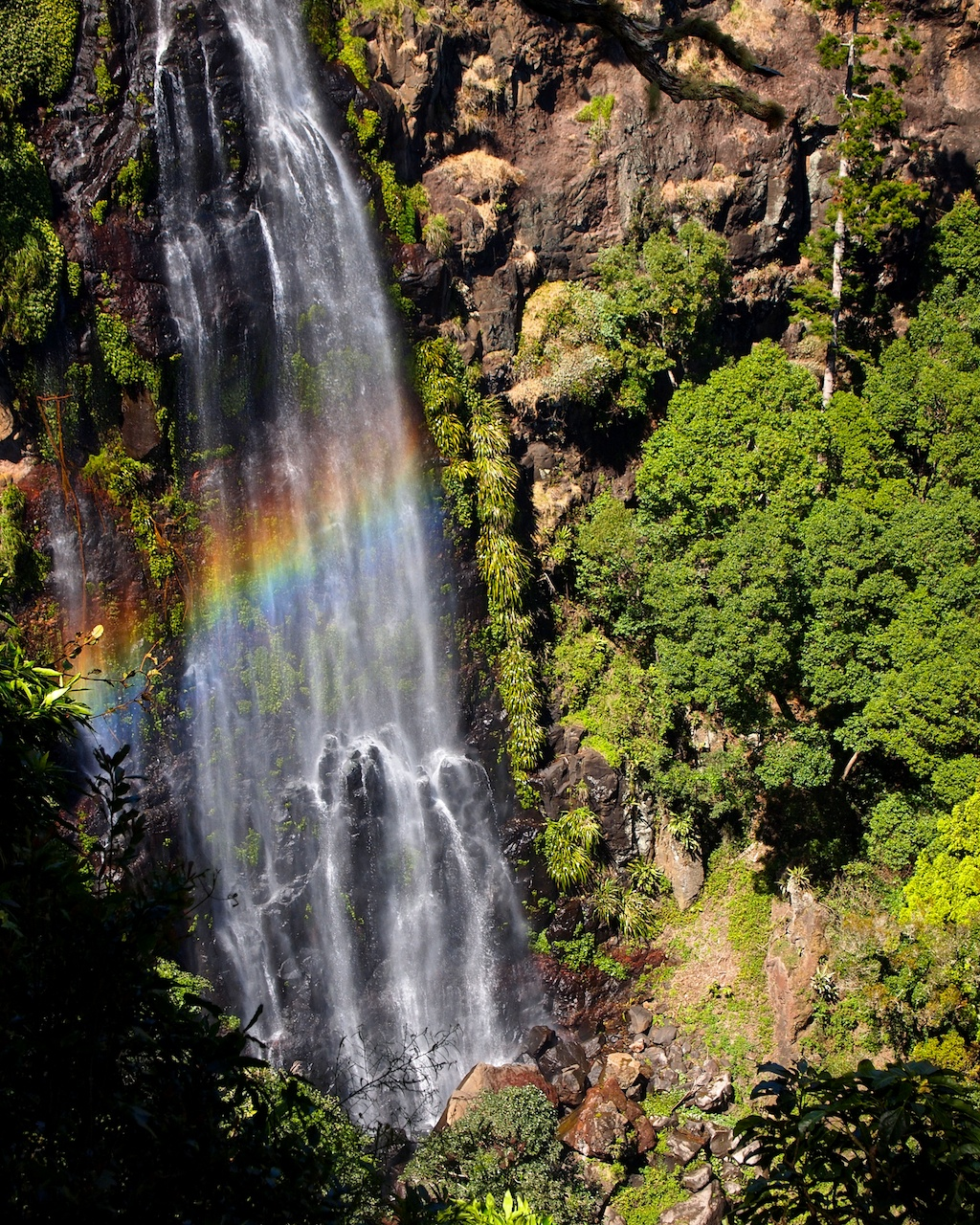
Morans Falls, 2013.

The park is claimed to contain more than 500 waterfalls, including popular tourist falls Elabana Falls and Box Log (Tullerigumai) Falls located in the Green Mountains Section. Yarrabilgong Falls and Coomera Falls both flow into Coomera Gorge. Morans Falls is another cascade that is passed on the 6-kilometre (3.7 mi) long Morans Falls Track. Nugurun Falls, Box Log Falls, Upper Ballanjui Falls, Lower Ballanjui Falls, Stairway Falls and Nagarigoon Falls are also located in the national park.

The claim of 500 waterfalls was confirmed by local explorer Dale Mullane in April 2022 when he reached his 500th documented waterfall in the park.

== Bushwalking ==
The park is covered by more than 150 km (93 mi) of clearly marked walks that were constructed during the Great Depression and designed by Romeo Lahey. Lahey studied dairy cow movements on the surrounding hills, noticing that their paths never had a gradient of greater than 1:10. He laid out the parks tracks in a similar manner so that walkers would not be out of breath. Where steep terrain was unavoidable, steps were used instead of a steep track.

Some are short and others are steep and take up to seven hours to complete. The well maintained and signed Border Track, follows the border between New South Wales and Queensland along the top of the McPherson Range. This track links Binna Burra Lodge to the O'Reilly's guesthouse at Green Mountains, a distance of some 23 kilometres (14 mi), which can be completed one way in a day or in 7 to 8 hours.

A number of other walks connect with this Border Track, creating an easily navigable network. These include the Box Forest Circuit, which is 10.9 kilometres (6.8 mi) or 4 hours return from O'Reilly's; Toolona Creek Circuit, which is 17.4 kilometres (10.8 mi) or 6 hours return, and the Albert River Circuit, which is 20.6 kilometres (12.8 mi) or 7 hours return to O'Reilly's. While the Border Track remains level for most of its length, many of the other tracks descend to lower elevations of 750 metres (2,460 ft) or less and provide access to some of the diverse variety of flora, fauna and geography to be found in the park.

Another attraction is the Tree Top Walk, suspended 15 metres (49 ft) above the ground. This walk provides the opportunity to safely walk through the canopy of the forest along a series of suspension bridges. Climbing a ladder up a strangler fig takes visitors to an observation deck 30 metres (98 ft) above the ground.

For experienced walkers there are also numerous trails traversing the park. These trails do not have clear tracks; in many cases there are only occasional markers in the natural forest and it is inadvisable to use them without the company of an experienced bushwalker who knows the area. The walk to the Stinson wreck is long and steep in places. Map reading and good navigation skills are a necessity and National Park Rangers should be notified before commencing. Camping overnight is not permitted without a permit. There are a number of natural hazards such as leeches, snakes and stinging trees that bushwalkers should be aware of.

== Accommodation ==
In addition to guest houses, there is also a campground available in the Green Mountains section of the park (adjacent to the O'Reilly's guest house), and a privately managed campground adjacent to the Binna Burra section of the park. Both camping areas have facilities. Limited bush camping is available between February and November.

== See also ==
- Elabana Falls
- Lamingtonium
- Protected areas of Queensland
