= Tweed Volcano =

Volcano in New South Wales, Australia

Coordinates: 28°23′44.71″S 153°16′0.19″E

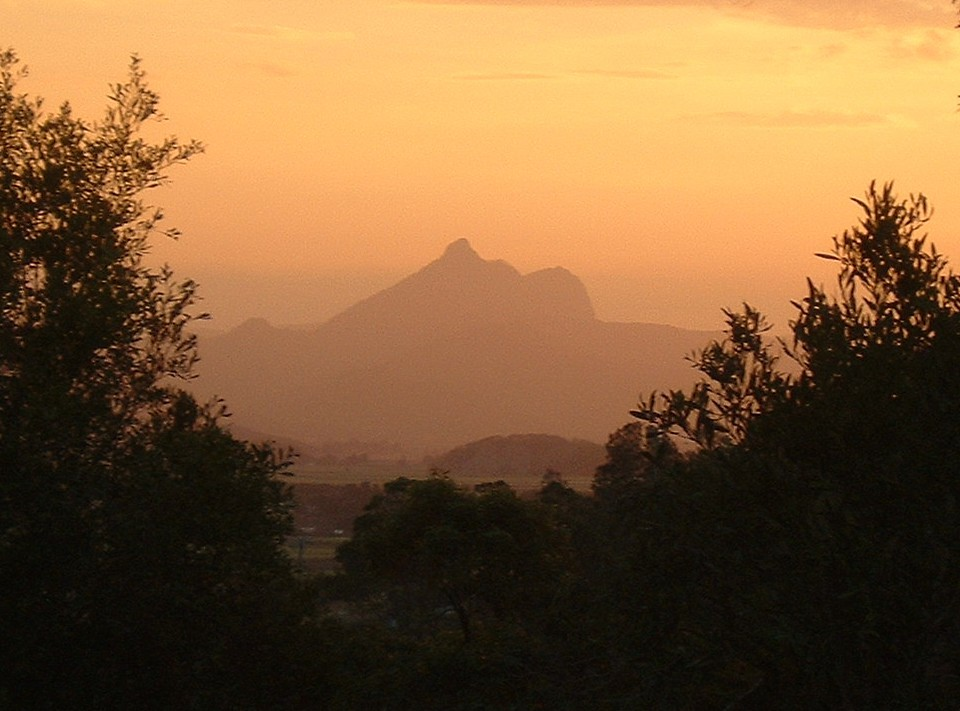
- After activity ceased, the volcano rapidly eroded. Pictured here is Mount Warning, a volcanic plug that marks where the summit used to be.

Highest point
- Elevation: ~1,900-2,312 m (6,200-7,586 ft)

Geography
- Location: Northeastern New South Wales
- Parent range: Great Dividing Range

Geology
- Rock age: Over 23 Million Years
- Mountain type: shield volcano
- Last eruption: ~23 Ma

Tweed Volcano is a partially eroded Early Miocene shield volcano located in northeastern New South Wales, which formed when this region of Australia passed over the East Australia hotspot around 23 million years ago. Mount Warning, Lamington Plateau and the Border Ranges between New South Wales and Queensland are among the remnants of this volcano that was originally over 100 kilometres (62 mi) in diameter and nearly twice the 1,156 metres (3,793 ft) height of Mount Warning today. In the 23 million years since the volcano was active, erosion has been extensive, forming a large erosion caldera around the volcanic plug of Mount Warning. Its erosion caldera is the largest in the Southern Hemisphere.

== Volcanic stratigraphy ==
Lavas from the Tweed Volcano are recognised as part of the Lamington Volcanics.

The volcanic stratigraphy of the Tweed Volcano is similar to many other hotspot volcanoes around the world. Eruptions of tholeiitic and some calc-alkaline basalts are the oldest recognised units derived from the volcano. These are named the Lismore Basalt and Beechmont Basalt in New South Wales and Queensland respectively. There are numerous flows recorded which may have been erupted irregularly as fossil soil (Paleosol) profiles and lacustrine type rock units are occasionally found within the rock unit.

Following eruption of the Lismore/Beechmont Basalt a period of eruption of rhyolite lavas took place. Eruptions occurred in lava and some pyroclastic forms. These rhyolites are known in New South Wales as the Nimbin Rhyolite and Queensland as the Binna Burra Rhyolite. Following eruption of this rhyolite a period of basaltic volcanism resumed (or continued) with the eruption of the Blue Knob (NSW)/Hobwee (QLD) Basalt.

The erosion of the volcano has resulted in the exposure of the central feeders of the volcano. These are most evident as Mount Warning and Mount Nullum, though there are numerous other volcanic vents identified all around the region as far away as Nimbin in New South Wales and Spring Mount in Queensland. The central volcanic area in the vicinity of Mount Warning and Mount Nullum is known as the Mount Warning Central Complex and is composed of intrusive rocks including syenite, peralkaline granite, microgranite, monzonite, dolerite, as well as some hyperbassal and volcanic rocks such as rhyolite and basalt.

The caldera, which has a diameter of around 30 kilometres, contains rich volcanic soils which supports agriculture, with the primary crop in the area being Sugarcane. The caldera is surrounded on most sides by mountains and plateaus. The two primary ranges which form the rim of the caldera are the mountain belt formed by the Tweed Range, Lamington Plateau and Springbrook Plateau and its eastward extensions consisting of ridges extending in a general northeastern direction towards the Gold Coast. This mountain belt which can be seen as one range forms the western and northern parts of the caldera rim. and the Nightcap Range to the south and a series of smaller hills to the east which are connected to the Nightcap Range. Much of the caldera is covered by Gondwana Rainforests. The ranges and plateaus fan outwards on the opposite side of the inner caldera. The rivers and creeks also generally flow in the valleys between the ridges and radiate outwards in a similar way as the mountains. Lamington National Park contains over 500 waterfalls and cascades which are from creeks which navigate through the rough terrain of the Lamington Plateau. The edge of the Lamington which meets the caldera descends steeply with layers of cliffs and offers extensive views into the caldera from various lookouts along the edge of the caldera rim which can be accessed via hiking tracks.

The Springbrook Plateau, which is mostly encompassed within the namesake Springbrook National Park, is situated to the east of the Lamington Plateau. This plateau is separated from the Lamington Plateau by the Numinbah Valley, which runs from the western reaches of Advancetown Lake to the Queensland/New South Wales border which also marks the edge of the caldera. Egg Rock/Indigenous Yugambeh name: Kurraragin (440m), Turtle Rock (510m) are situated on the eastern foothills of the Lamington Plateau, at the northern tip of Ships Stern (700m), an extension of the Lamington Plateau. The two rock formations listed consist of rhyolite and were formed from subsidiary vents. On the edge of the rim of the Springbrook Plateau, there are many viewpoints overlooking the caldera, most of which are located on peaks such as Mount Mumdjin, Springbrook Mountain and Mount Thillinmam. West of the Springbrook Plateau is Mount Tenduragan, a small pyramidal mountain west of the main Springbrook Plateau connected by a spur. An easterly ridge which connects to the main Springbrook Plateau contains the twin peaks of Mount Cougal. Extending from the East Peak of Mount Cougal is a ridge which leads to Boyds Butte, an exposed rock feature. Further along this ridge is Tallebudgera Mountain, a roughly Y shaped plateau formed from lava flows. The Both Valleys Reserve covers much of this mountain.

There are two notable gaps within the ring of mountains surrounding the caldera which allow easy access in and out of the caldera. The westerly gap is located between Mount Burrell (933m) of the Nightcap Range and Lofts Pinnacle of the Tweed Range. Kyogle Road, which runs from the namesake town of Kyogle to Murwillumbah crosses the unnamed gap.

Much of the mountains in the Tweed Caldera rim are covered in various types of forest, predominantly subtropical rainforest. These various volcanic origin features have a large vertical component, and the cliffs host lithophytic species. Some notable and easily observable lithophytic plants within the Tweed Volcano area include: -Doryanthes palmeri -Hoya australis -Dendrobium kingianum -Dendrobium speciosum

== See also ==
- List of volcanoes in Australia
- Tweed Range
