= O'Reilly's Rainforest Retreat =

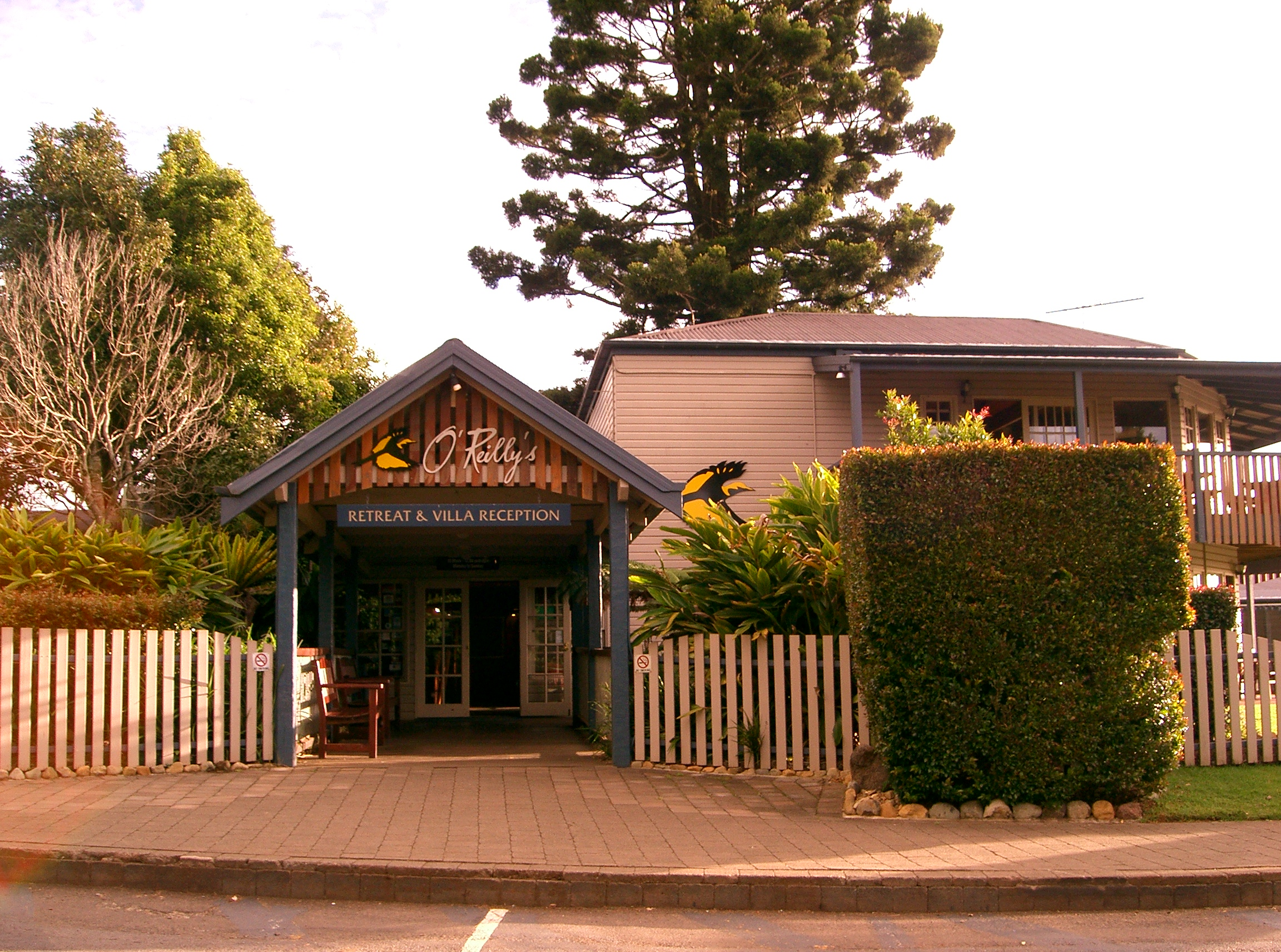
- Entrance
- Interactive map of the O'Reilly's Rainforest Retreat area

General information
- Coordinates: 28.2312°S 153.1354°E
- Opening: 1912
- Owner: O'Reilly Family

Website
- oreillys.com.au

O'Reilly's Rainforest Retreat is a tourist destination in the locality of O'Reilly, Scenic Rim Region, Queensland, Australia. It is situated in the heart of the Lamington National Park, two hours by road south of Brisbane and 90 minutes by road west of the Gold Coast. Access to the mountain resort is via Canungra. Guests began staying from Easter 1926. Gravel road to the door of the retreat was completed in early 1947, marking a distinct change in the site's accessibility.

O'Reilly's Rainforest Retreat consists of accommodation villas, picnic grounds and marks the starting point of a number of popular hiking trails. It is well known for its rainforest location, unique and diverse wildlife, and for being the home of the late Bernard O'Reilly, an Australian bushman and author, who is remembered for his efforts in locating the survivors of the 1937 Stinson plane crash.

== History ==
In 1912, eight men of the O'Reilly family each started farming in the McPherson Range. They milked cattle and collected timber but the income was too little. In 1915 Lamington National Park was established around their land. O'Reilly's Rainforest Retreat was founded in 1926 by the O'Reilly brothers. The initial accommodation was very basic and in the early years access was only via horse and wagon along a precipitous mountain track. The track was known as Stockyard Creek Track. The O'Reillys had cut the track themselves from Canungra over the Sarabah Range.

Guests first travelled via train to Beaudesert and then horse drawn coach to the Kerry Hotel, where they would stay the night. The next day they were met with one of the O'Reillys and a pack of horses for the ride up the mountain. Luggage and supplies were carried by packhorses. In the 1930s the family began a company to expand and raise money. One of the first purchases was a car to transport guests from the railway station.

St Joseph's Catholic Church was the first Catholic church in the Logan River valley and was opened in 1876 on a 4-acre (1.6 ha) site, then known as Tullamore Hill, later as Veresdale, and now within Gleneagle. In 1936, the church received lining and a ceiling for the first time. By the early 1950s the small church was in poor repair and it had a very small congregation (St Mary's Catholic Church in Beaudesert was very large and by then the major town of the district). At that time, Mass was being held regularly at the O'Reilly Guesthouse in Goblin Wood, the private home of Bernard O'Reilly, so it was decided to relocate St Joseph's to the O'Reilly Guesthouse as a permanent church. It was dismantled, transported via Canungra and re-assembled. On 27 November 1955, Father Steele presided over the first Mass in the relocated church (28.2309°S 153.1351°E) and Archbishop James Duhig performed the opening ceremony. Although privately owned by the O'Reilly family, it is still strongly associated with the Beaudesert Catholic parish.

From the 1950s operations were managed by Mick and Annie O'Reilly and their family, including their grandchildren, as of 2008.

Between 1990 and 1994, extensions to the resort designed by architect Maurice Hurst updated the guesthouse accommodation and other buildings.

During the severe 2019–20 Australian bushfire season more than 100 guests staying at O'Reilly's, which was unaffected, were safely evacuated ahead of the bushfires that destroyed nearby Binna Burra.

== Attractions ==
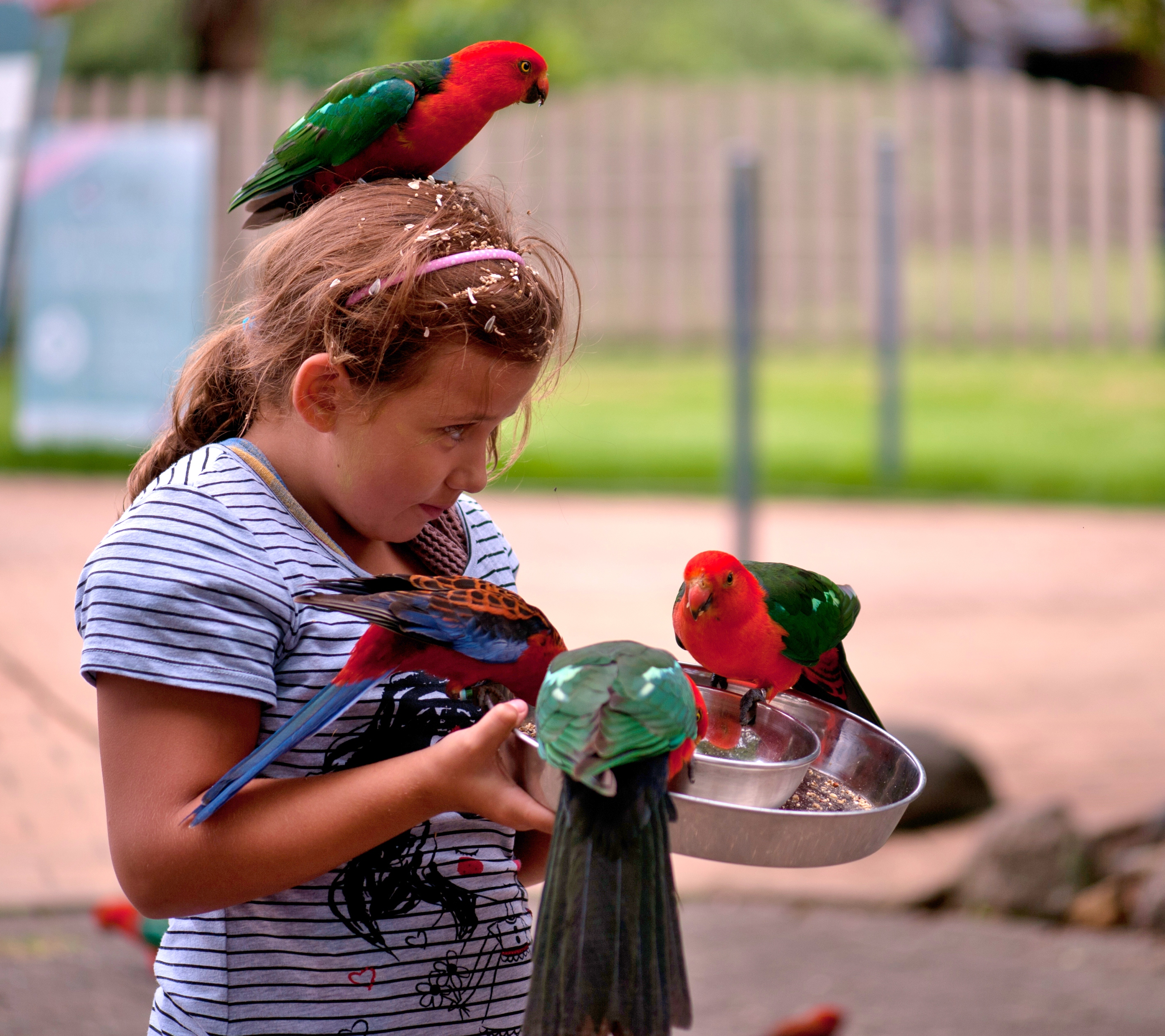
Feeding the birds, 2011

Bird feeding is encouraged with seed available for sale to visitors. Bush walking is another popular activity in the area.

=== Birdlife ===
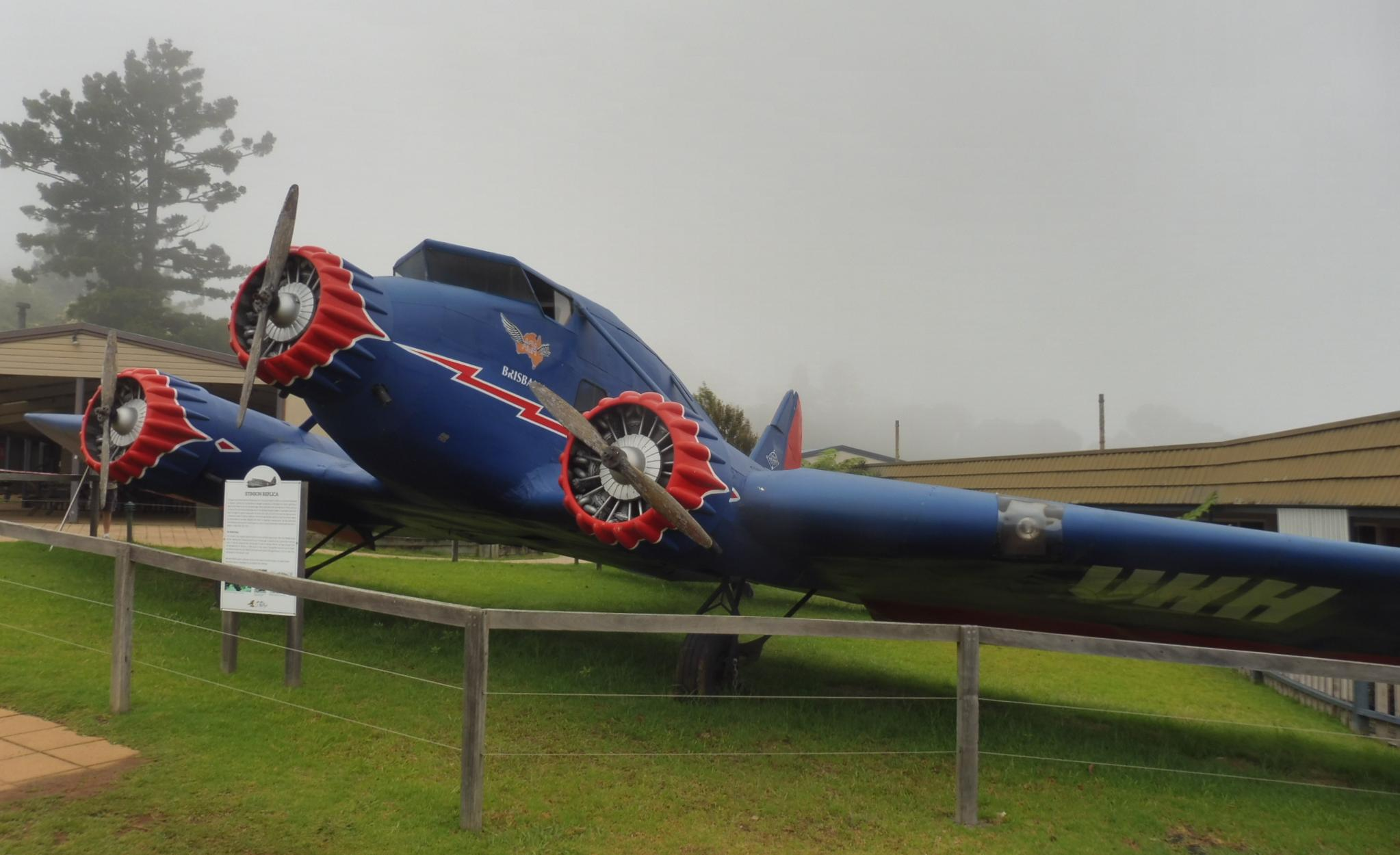
Replica of Stinson Model A VH-UHH at O'Reilly's, used in the 1987 film The Riddle of the Stinson

The forests of Lamington National Park provide excellent habitat for a range of birds. Some species have become unconcerned by close interaction with people at O'Reilly's, including the regent bowerbird, Australian king parrot and crimson rosellas. Wonga pigeons and the Australian brush turkey are also common.

=== 1937 Stinson crash site ===
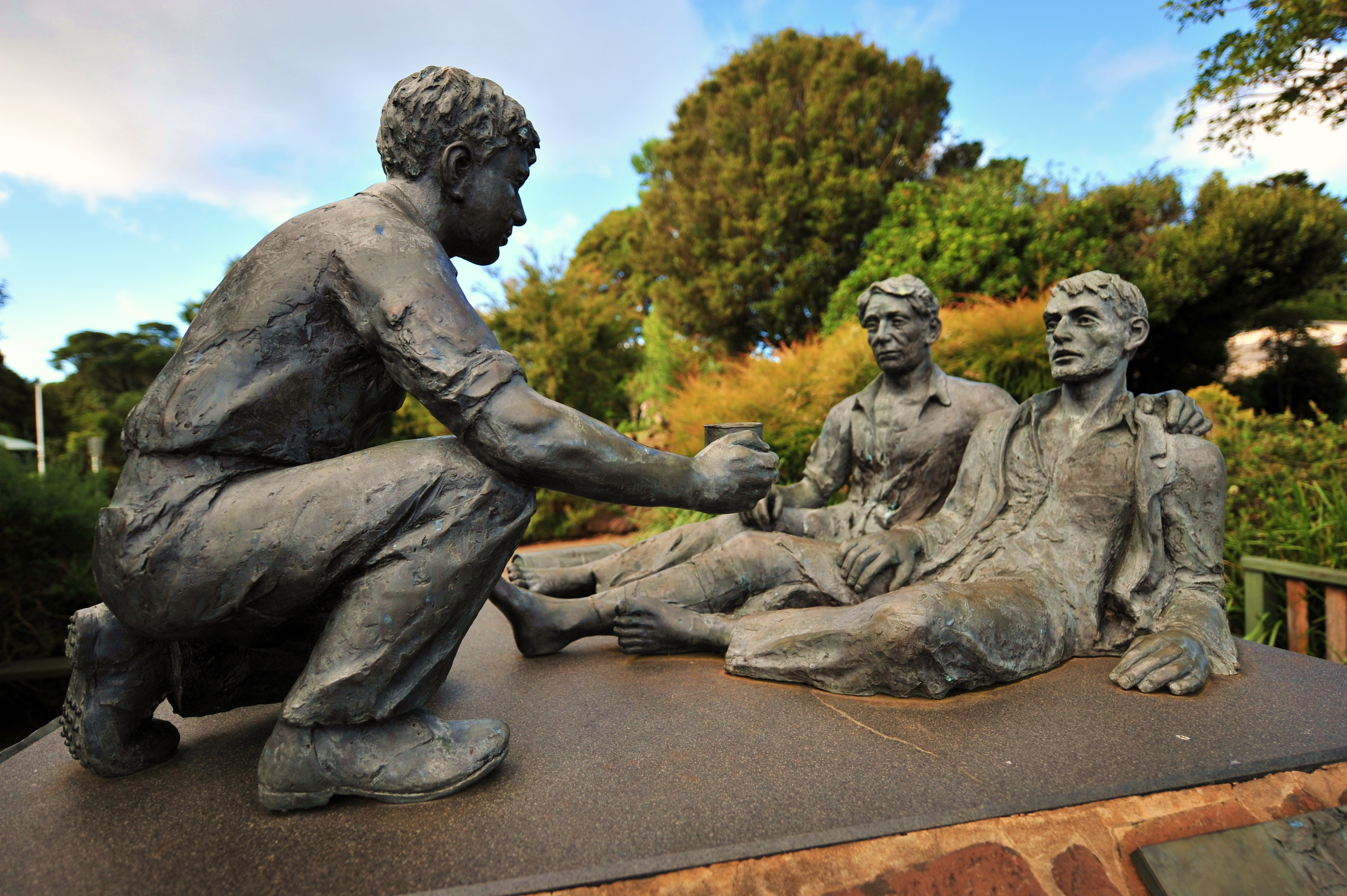
Bronze statue at O'Reilly's Guesthouse depicting the rescue

The Australian National Airways Stinson crash was an accident which occurred on 19 February 1937. The Stinson Model A airliner disappeared during a flight from Brisbane to Sydney, carrying five passengers and two pilots. Both pilots and two passengers were killed in the crash. One of the surviving passengers died while attempting to bring help to the other survivors. The wreckage was found by Bernard O'Reilly of the Lamington Guest House who went looking for the aircraft believing it had failed to cross the border. The aircraft had crashed in the McPherson Range on the border between Queensland and New South Wales.

O'Reilly's is situated approximately 8.4 kilometres from the site of the 1937 Stinson plane crash (28.309156°S 153.117789°E). As a result, the site of the wreck has become a popular hiking destination with bushwalkers. O'Reilly's Rainforest Retreat infrequently organises guided treks to the wreck, but experienced bushwalkers are known to frequently attempt the hike. The hike is renowned for its difficulty due to the steep nature of the McPherson Range where the wreck is situated, and the thick, dense terrain of the rainforest. A memorial to Bernard O'Reilly is located in the grounds around the guesthouse.

In the late 1980s, the Australian Army removed large portions of the wreck using a helicopter. As a result, only a small, skeletal section of the plane's hull remains.

=== Tree Top Walk ===
In 1987, O'Reilly's Rainforest Retreat opened the Tree Top Walk, a 180 metre long suspension bridge situated 20 metres above the rainforest floor. The Tree Top Walk provides a bird-eye view of the rainforest canopy and sweeping views of the McPherson Range. It was the first of its kind in Australia.

== See also ==
- Tourism in Australia
