= Stateroom One =

- Genre: drama play
- Country of origin: Australia
- Language: English
- Written by: Maxwell Dunn
- Original release: 1938

Stateroom One is a 1938 Australian radio play by Maxwell Dunn.

Its production was used to launch the Tasmanian station 7ZR. It aired the same night as The Bush Legend.

The play was popular and was produced again in 1939 and 1942.

A copy of the play is at the Fryer Library at the University of Queensland.

== Premise ==
The play follows many interconnected plotlines that begin at Maidstone, Prison on the edge of Dartmoor, move through London, and conclude aboard an ocean liner in the Mediterranean Sea. The story revolves around a baronet, a society woman, a famous jewel, the mysterious Maharaja of Jaladpur, and his secretary. Following a midnight shooting, to which there were no witnesses, the characters converge in the ship's stateroom where Detective-Inspector Landon investigates the mystery"
