= Maurice Hurst =

Maurice Hurst may refer to:

- Maurice Hurst (cornerback) (born 1967), former American football player
- Maurice Hurst Jr. (born 1995), American football player
- Maurice Hurst (architect) (1929–2003), Australian architect
