= Moon Magic (radio play) =

- Wireless Weekly 10 May 1939
- Genre: drama play
- Running time: 50 mins (8:00 pm – 8:50 pm)
- Country of origin: Australia
- Language: English
- Syndicates: ABC
- Written by: Maxwell Dunn
- Directed by: Dion Wheeler
- Original release: May 12, 1939

Moon Magic is a 1939 Australian radio play by Maxwell Dunn. It was set in Africa, like his earlier serial Jungle Drums.

The play appears to have been written by 1938 but was not broadcast until the following year. It was popular and was produced again in 1940.

The Wireless Weekly radio critic said Dunn "has exploited the possibilities of this dark subject to the full—and very enjoyably... so carefully has the playwright increased the tension, with such expertness does one dramatic incident follow another, that “Moon Magic” is one of the most blood- curdling radio plays to be heard for some time."

== Premise ==
"A drama of darkest Africa founded on that hideously cruel cult of diabolism, -Voodoo. In the Smoking room of the Whiteway Club, an aristocratic London resort, is often to be found a young man seated alone. His name is Ricksby Windsor Torrence, a man of a good English family. Though nearly all his life has been spent in England he 'is only now learning to speak the language. A noticeable thing about him is that his hair is quite white. What turned it- white? To tell that the listener must be transported! back in time and away in space, In fact ta a small clearing in, the Congo jungle."

== Cast of 1939 production ==
- George Randall as Victor Osborne, outpost official.
- Keith Howard as Ricksby Windsor-Torrence
- Bebe Scott as Sheila Windsor-Torrence.
