= Jungle Drums (radio serial) =

- Genre: drama serial
- Running time: 30 mins (8:00 pm – 8:30 pm)
- Country of origin: Australia
- Language: English
- Home station: 2FC
- Syndicates: ABC
- Written by: Maxwell Dunn
- Directed by: John Cairns
- Original release: October 4 – December 6, 1937
- No. of series: 1
- No. of episodes: 10

Jungle Drums is a 1937 Australian radio serial by Maxwell Dunn. It was his first radio drama and was very popular, launching his career.

The serial replaced As Ye Sow as the ABC's national serial.

Dunn followed it with other serials, Light Sinister, The Highest Command and Moon Magic. The latter was also set in Africa.

== Premise ==
"An English party which embarks on an expedition to darkest Africa, to discover the whereabouts of the long-loet father of the heroine. The chief characters are Edward Gordon, a noted African explorer; his friend, the honourable Terry Clare, Earl of Truscott and Inverness, wbo finances the expedition; Jill Trelawney, the heroine; and Dr. Quintin Vaughan, an authority on African native customs, who quickly reveal himself as the villain of the piece. As well as the sinister Dr. Vaughan, the forces arrayed against the party include a curious jungle plant which breathes and kills men, a race of giants, and a pigmy tribe of killers. The party is caught in a cave, and earthquakes and other horrors add to the danger."

== Episodes ==
- Ep 1 The Drum Speaks (4 October 1937) "“Where no white man has set foot” ... So said the explorer, Roger Trelawney, to his daughter Jill, before leaving on his last expedition to Africa—an expedition from which he did not return. Had he ventured there unwillingly, answering to the mysteriously insistent voice of the Sounding Drum, that stained ivory talisman of the Fan-leh-len-do? Edward Gordon and Lord Terry Truscott may have raised doubting eyebrows; that is. until they themselves heard."
- Ep 2 The First Trick (11 October) "Acting on the precept that surprise is the key-note of attack, Doctor Vaughan strikes with startling suddenness, and in an unexpected quarter. What connection can the color of Lord Truscott’s valet’s hair have with the disappearance of Roger Trelawney in Central Africa? Apparently none... but Doctor Vaughan plays the double game—and his first card is an Ace!"
- Ep 3 The Flower of Death (15 October) - "The kidnapping of 9am Hackitt shows Doctor Vaughan has yet not all the cards in it. Perhaps the scientific wisdom of Professor Hercules Mosstien will pierce the seemingly impenetrable mystery that surrounds the history of the Sounding Drum. For, before he went on his last safari, Roger Trelawney deposited with his solicitors a sealed box. What it contains brings Jill Trelawney and her friends a little nearer the truth, but even then it is still just out of reach."
- Ep 4 Into the Unknown (22 October) - "Africa Bound Jill Trelawney, radiant with hope of finding her father, and Edward Gordon falling more and more deeply in love with her—the whole party blissfully unaware of the dangers that await them. The secret of Roger Trelawney’s quest is still unsolved, but Killenjui, the native mentioned in Roger’s letter, is expected to provide the solution Doctor Vaughan, meanwhile, watches and waits silently for the next move."
- Ep 5 Brotherhood of the Ghost Man - "The shrilling of phantom flutes cuts across the brooding African night. . . . Edward Gordon and his companions deep in the Kingdom of the White Flower, make violent contact with that ruthless native pigmy organisation, at whose name every true African native shudders in fear. The boma is surrounded with invisible enemies... the party reckoned without the treachery of Doctor Vaughan."
- Ep 6 The Trap is Spring (8 November) - " The faithful Killenjui succeeds in rescuing Jill Trelawney and Lord Truscott from the captivity of the dreaded Ghost Men. The party, deserted by its native porters, moves forward with all possible speed to forestall Doctor Vaughan at the Cavern of Eternal Echoes. But first there is the deadly barrier of the White P.ower to be crossed."
- Ep 7 Entombed (15 November) "Doctor Vaughan has triumphed! Sam is once more in his hands, and the road to the Forgotten City is for him now open. The Truscott expedition is entombed in the Caverns of Echoes, at the mercy of the strange dwellers in that eternal darkxi'*;s. But even in this blackest hour, when all chance of escape is gone and Roger Trelawney’s secret seems lost to them forever, Lord Truscott finds his regard for Jane Pross has bocome something deeper."
- Ep 8 City of the Seven Hills (19 November) - "With Jill joyfully reunited with her father, the party for a moment forgets its hopeless position, only to be forcibly re-minded of it later. In the Temple of the Sounding Drums, the Forgotten People, swayed by the fanatical voice of M’Rutut, demand the lives of the prisoners. But at the eleventh hour the wrath of Sa-Amon bursts upon the city."
- Ep 9 Capture "Terrific earthquake shocks and volcanic eruptions overwhelm the City of the Forgotten People. Edward Gordon, with Jill and Trelawney, pass swiftly through the mountains on the waters of the underground river, only to meet further disaster."
- Ep 10 Final Episode (6 December) - "Doctor Vaughan has lost—the Forgotten City is buried forever below the smoking craters of the Seven Hills. Our friends turn their backs regretfully upon Africa, but not before Roger Trelawney destroys the last connecting link with the Old World. Even then, the Sounding Drum still retains its formidable secret."
