= 1937 Airlines of Australia Stinson crash =

Aircraft accident in Australia

Stinson Model A City of Brisbane crash
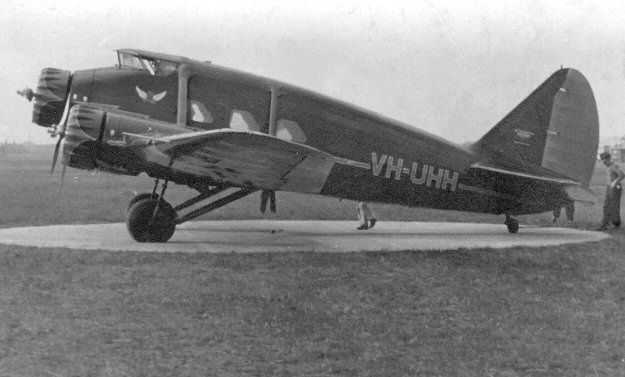
- VH-UHH, the aircraft involved, seen in 1936

Accident
- Date: 19 February 1937
- Summary: Controlled flight into terrain
- Site: Lamington National Park; 28.309156°S 153.117789°E

Aircraft
- Aircraft type: Stinson Model A
- Aircraft name: City of Brisbane
- Operator: Airlines of Australia
- Registration: VH-UHH
- Flight origin: Archerfield Airport, Brisbane
- Stopover: Lismore Airport, Lismore
- Destination: Sydney Airport, Sydney
- Passengers: 5
- Crew: 2 (pilots)
- Fatalities: 5; both pilots and 2 passengers died in crash (one survivor died later while searching for help)
- Injuries: 2
- Survivors: 3; passengers who survived crash, 1 died later while searching for help

The 1937 Airlines of Australia Stinson crash was an accident which occurred on 19 February 1937. The Airlines of Australia Stinson Model A airliner disappeared during a flight from Brisbane to Sydney, carrying five passengers and two pilots. Both pilots and two passengers were killed in the crash. One of the surviving passengers died while attempting to bring help to the other survivors.

The aircraft crashed in the McPherson Range on the border between Queensland and New South Wales. The wreckage was found by Bernard O'Reilly of the Lamington Guest House who went looking for the aircraft believing it had failed to cross the border. The story garnered widespread interest due to the use of similar planes during the early days of aviation in Australia. The dramatic events brought prominence to the guesthouse.

== The flight ==
The aircraft was one of three new Stinson tri-motor aircraft purchased in February 1936 for Airlines of Australia, 'said to be the most modern and luxuriously equipped and fitted 'planes operating in U.S.A. to-day'. At a cruising speed of 165 miles per hour (266 km/h), they could climb to 8,000 feet (2,400 m), and had a retractable undercarriage, variable-pitch propellers, and landing flaps. The airplane was registered VH-UHH and called Brisbane. The others were registered VH-UGG (Lismore) and VH-UKK (Townsville). (Note: VH-UKK, Townsville, was renamed Binana, and still in use by 1945.) (Note: One month later, on 27 March 1937 at 5.30 am near the Archerfield aerodrome, VH-UGG crashed en route to Townsville, killing the pilot and one other person. (The Northern Herald (Cairns, Qld), 22 May 1937, p. 19, http://nla.gov.au/nla.news-article150554969) This occurred in fog, and a failure of the right engine was later noted.)

Some of the airline's aircraft on the Sydney–Brisbane mail route were fitted with radios. Prior to the crash, the pilot Boyden and the airline's managing director had discussed the purpose of fitting a radio for emergencies, which was infant technology at the time. It was noted the pilots had only basic proficiency in Morse code, and weather reports might have to be transmitted as slowly as five words per minute.

On Friday, 19 February 1937, VK-UKK Townsville had been flown by pilot Shepherd from Sydney to Archerfield, Brisbane, via the coastal route, arriving 11.30 am; with VK-UHH Brisbane flown by Boyden arriving half-an-hour later from Sydney, via the inland route.

The weather conditions over the coastal route were considered 'a little sticky'; while the furnished report from Sydney 'was not bad'. Lismore had been raining, with 'quite a bit of water on the field'; Archerfield was not concerning. Determining whether to fly however was always given to be a matter for the pilot.

Taking off from Archerfield after 1.00 pm on Friday, VH-UHH Brisbane flown by Boyden and co-piloted by Shepherd was meant to arrive in Sydney by 4.30 pm. Almost immediately, 'HH' flew into cyclonic weather. It was later indicated the south-easterly winds would strike the southern face of the McPherson Range plateau, rising, and causing extreme turbulence to a considerable height; wind blowing at 40 to 60 miles per hour (64 to 97 km/h) in gusts; a quite rare occasion for that part of Queensland, and would be confined to a very local area.

The aircraft was reported missing by 7.30 pm Friday night.

=== Searches ===
Missing aircraft searches were concentrated mostly north of Sydney, New South Wales, towards Newcastle, and included four Royal Australian Air Force aircraft. Sister Stinson aircraft VH-UKK also left Archerfield on Saturday morning and unsuccessfully checked the McPherson Range area. The highest part of the range is Mount Barney at 1,359 metres (4,459 ft). Separate to reports north of Sydney, and Taree, sound of a possible crashed aircraft was reported by a farmer from Nimbin, New South Wales, and searches were launched from Lismore. Most hope of finding the aircraft was abandoned by Tuesday, 23 February 1937.

== Discovery ==
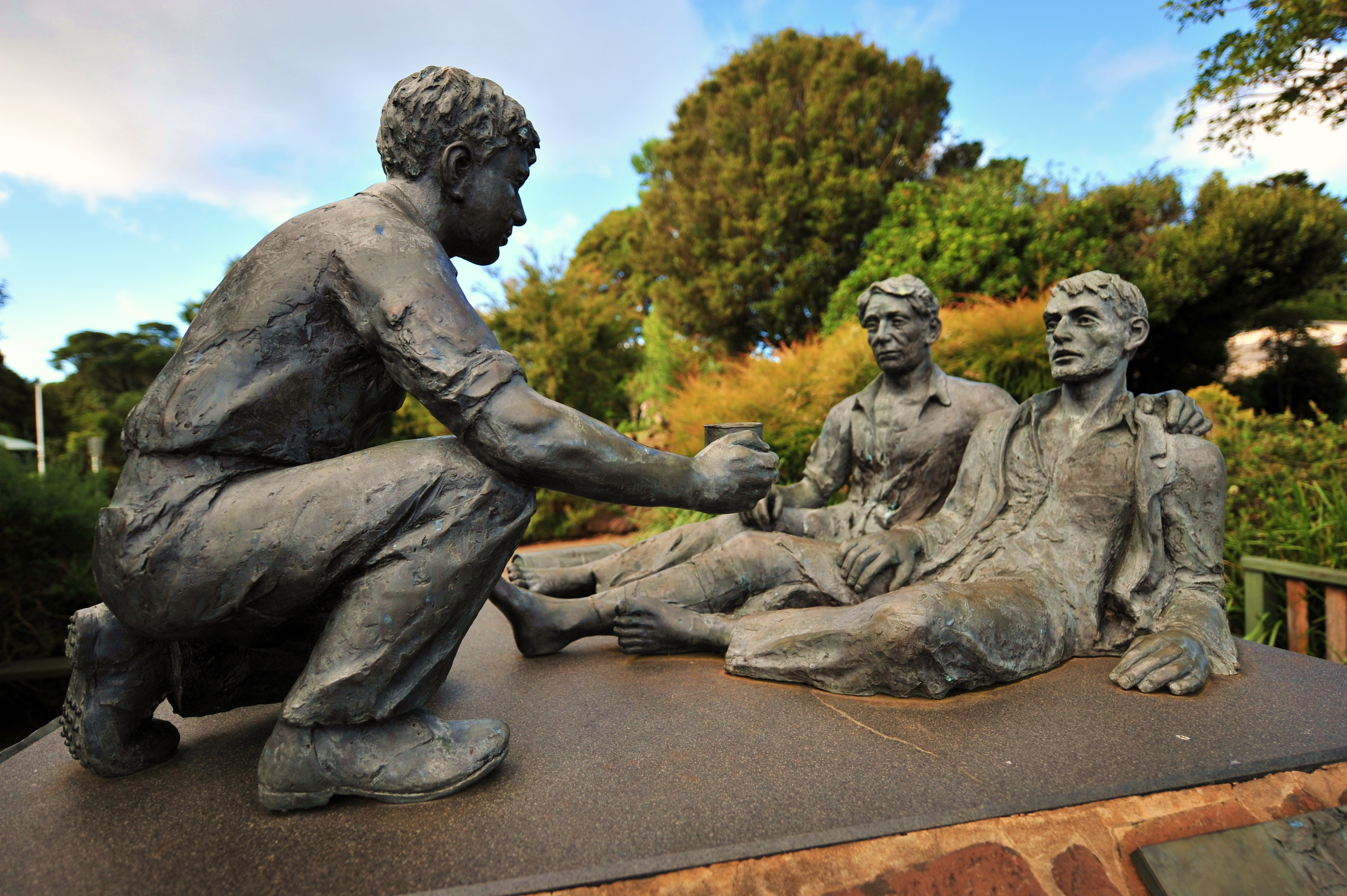
Bronze statue at O'Reilly's Rainforest Retreat depicting the rescue

The aircraft was heard by people in Lamington and Hill View areas south of Beaudesert, Queensland at approximately 1:40 p.m. on Friday, 19 February 1937. It was circling at low altitude and then headed towards the mountain range. There was heavy rain in the area at the time.

After reported sightings of the aircraft in New South Wales proved to be false, Bernard O'Reilly believed it must have had insufficient height to clear the mountains and subsequently crashed somewhere in the McPherson range. He hiked into the mountains to look for the aircraft on Saturday, 27 February 1937, and after camping overnight he found the crash site at about 4:30pm on the afternoon of 28 February with the two survivors waiting by the wreckage: Joseph Binstead who was uninjured, and John Proud who had a broken leg. On seeing O'Reilly, they asked to shake his hand and then wanted to know the cricket scores. They had been able to get water from a creek about a mile from the crash site but had had no food. Two other passengers and the two pilots died from injuries sustained in the crash. Another passenger, James Westray, aged 25 from London, had received major burns and other minor injuries in the accident and left to find help the morning after the crash, but died after he fell over a cliff. O’Reilly discovered Westray’s body on his journey down the mountain to summon help for the survivors.

The crash site is about 82 kilometres (51 mi) S/SSE of the Archerfield Aerodrome.

O'Reilly later wrote of his experiences in the book Green Mountains (1940).

== Crew and passengers ==
Crew

- Reginald Haslam 'Rex' Boyden, experienced chief pilot, aged 40. Former WW1 army soldier and RAF pilot. Deceased, killed instantly.
- Beverley G. M. Shepherd, experienced first pilot, aged 26. From Sydney, NSW. Deceased, killed instantly.

Passengers

- Joseph Robert 'Joe' Binstead, aged 54, company director and wool broker, from Sydney, New South Wales. Survivor, suffering a leg injury.
- William Walden Fountain, aged 41, architect, New York. Fountain had been supervising the construction of a new theatre in Brisbane for Metro-Goldwyn-Mayer. Deceased.
- James Ronald (or Roland) Naire R. Graham, aged 55, managing director, printers supplies, of Sydney, New South Wales. Deceased.
- John Seymour Proud (1907 – 9 October 1997), mining engineer and member of a jewellery retailer family, of Wahroonga, New South Wales. Survivor, with compound fracture of the leg.
- James Guthrie 'Jim' Westray, aged 25, from England on a business trip, insurance underwriter, Lloyd's, London. Survivor able to walk, but later died from injuries sustained when going for help.

== Inquiries ==
The Air Accidents Investigation Committee found 'the machine was swept down by a down current', and the Civil Aviation Department control officer, Archerfield Aerodrome stated 'Knowing Pilot Boyden, I will say that he was not negligent'. The coroner of a later inquiry stated 'he could not place any reliance on the Air Accidents Investigation, because the evidence was not taken in public, and he did not know where they got their evidence'.

A coronial inquiry was held in Brisbane concluded on Friday, 16 April 1937. Weather conditions were a strong focus of the investigations, and whether communications equipment would have been beneficial. The airline's flight superintendent discussed the altimeter, discounted the suggestions of the two surviving passengers as lacking experience to determine the aircraft's flying height, and believed the crash cause was 'an abnormal down current of air'.

The coroner Mr J. J. Leahy, while not empowered under the statute to make any findings, noted the airline company had a very good and comforting flying record, 'tragic fatalities should be awaited to provide generating reasons for the institution of improvements to safeguard human life', and the authorities if studying the evidence presented to the inquiry,

should be possible to draw soundly-based conclusions pointing to the pressing need for improved methods of ground organisation, centralised control, and supervision at the aerodrome of pilots and their duties, the supply of up-to-the-minute weather reports on air routes, the establishment of reporting stations, and the utilisation to the fullest extent of radio aids.

== Memorials ==
A plaque is at the incident site.

A monument was erected at Collins Gap, on the then-Bruxner Highway, Queensland–New South Wales border for Westray. It was paid by public subscription, and unveiled in 1937. It is 40 kilometres (25 mi) WSW of the crash site.

A replica of the Stinson Model A, from the 1987 movie, is displayed outside O'Reilly's Rainforest Retreat, Lamington National Park.

== Dramatisation ==
The Riddle of the Stinson, a 1987 made-for-TV drama film about the crash and rescue, was broadcast in 1988 on Network 10. Directed by Chris Noonan, it starred Jack Thompson as O'Reilly.

== See also ==
- 1945 Australian National Airways Stinson crash
- The Riddle of the Stinson, a 1987 Australian television film about the 1937 crash and the rescue of the survivors
