= Halse Lodge =

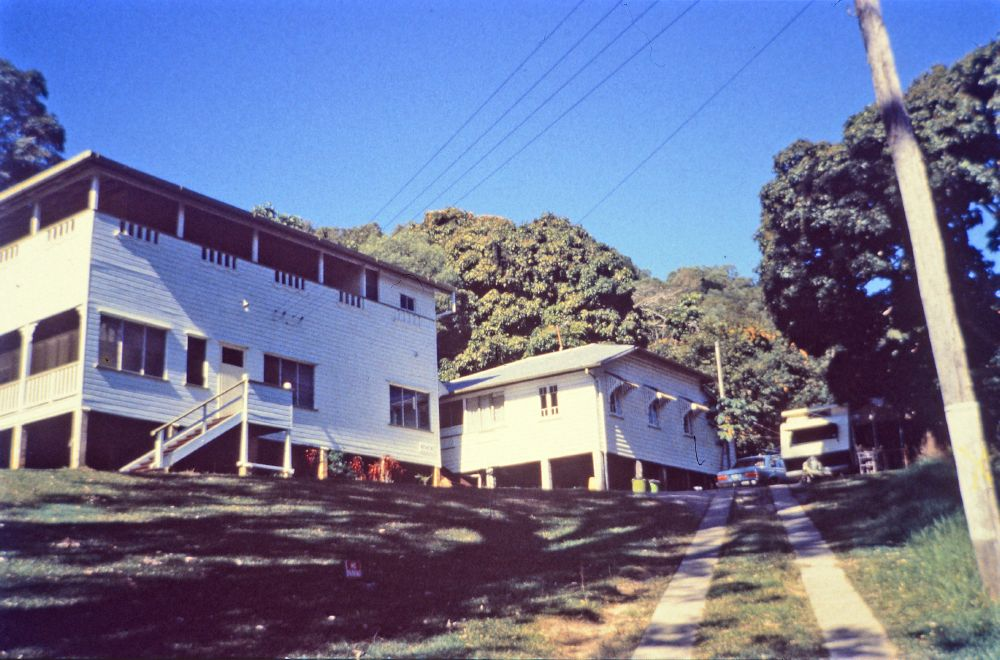
- Halse Lodge, before 1988

- Location within Queensland Location within Australia
- 26.3891°S 153.0923°E
- Location: 17 Noosa Drive, Noosa Heads, Shire of Noosa, Queensland, Australia

History
- Design period: 1870s–1890s (late 19th century)
- Built: 1880s–1920s

Queensland Heritage Register
- Official name: Halse Lodge, Bay View, Hillcrest Guest House
- Type: state heritage (built)
- Designated: 30 April 1997
- Reference no.: 601393
- Significant period: 1880s–1920s (fabric); 1880s–1950s (historical); 1920s– (social)
- Significant components: driveway, trellis, service wing, residential accommodation – guest house/s, residential accommodation – caretaker's quarters, amenities building, terracing, conference/activities centre, views to, natural landscape, views from, courtyard

Halse Lodge is a heritage-listed boarding house at 17 Noosa Drive, Noosa Heads, Shire of Noosa, Queensland, Australia. It was built from 1880s to 1920s. It is also known as Bay View and Hillcrest Guest House. It was added to the Queensland Heritage Register on 30 April 1997.

== History ==
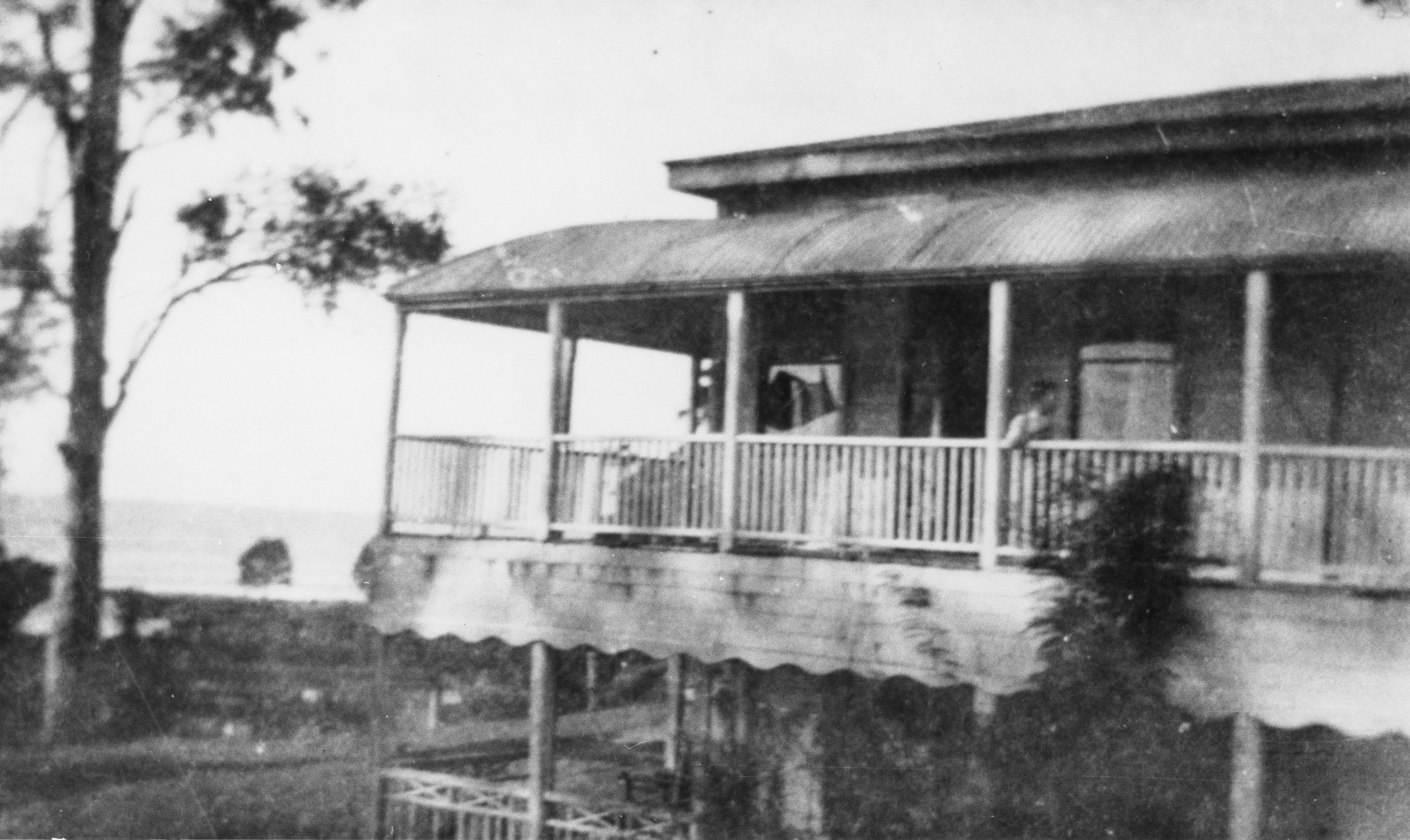
Bayview House

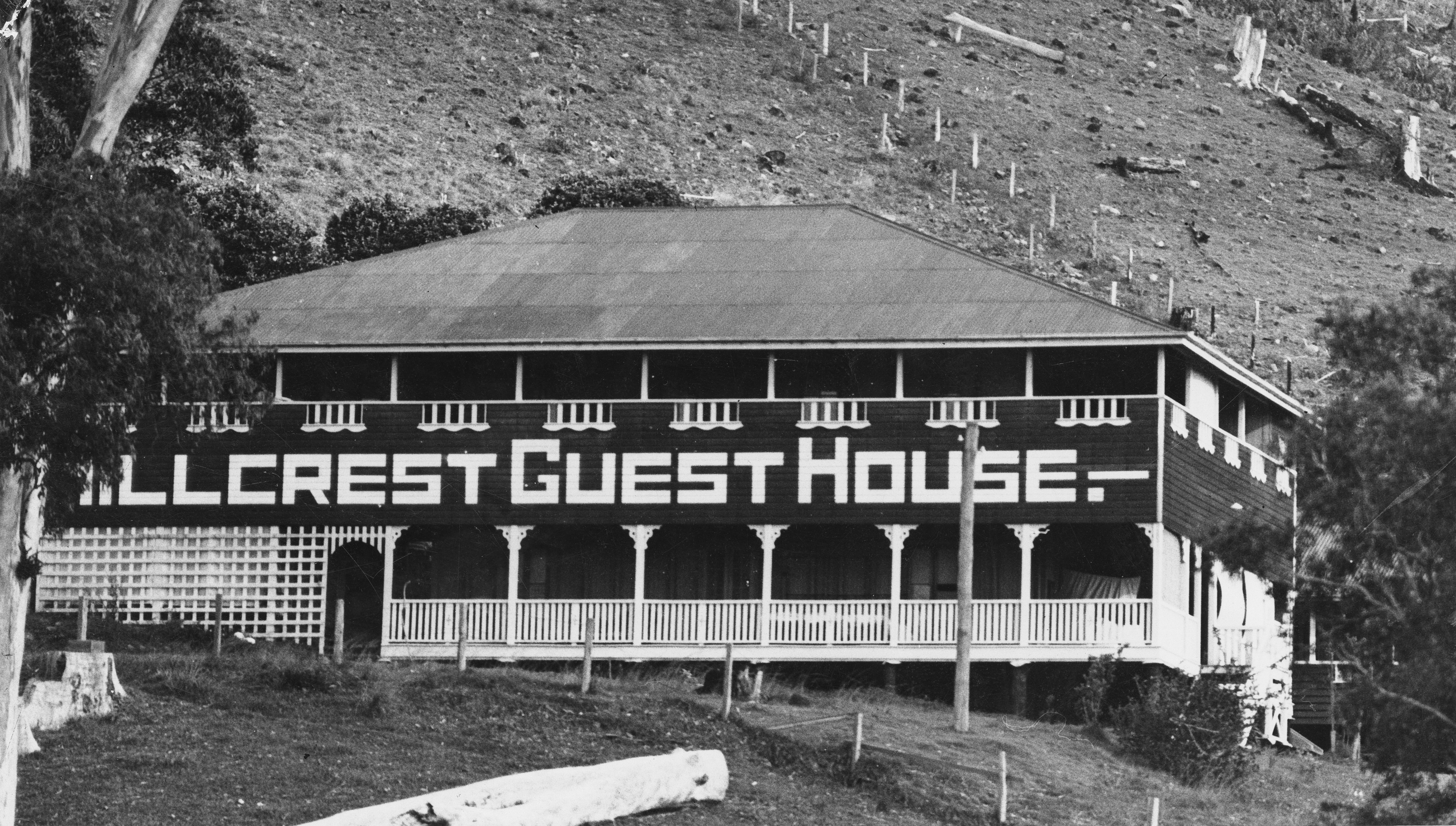
Hillcrest Guest House, 1928

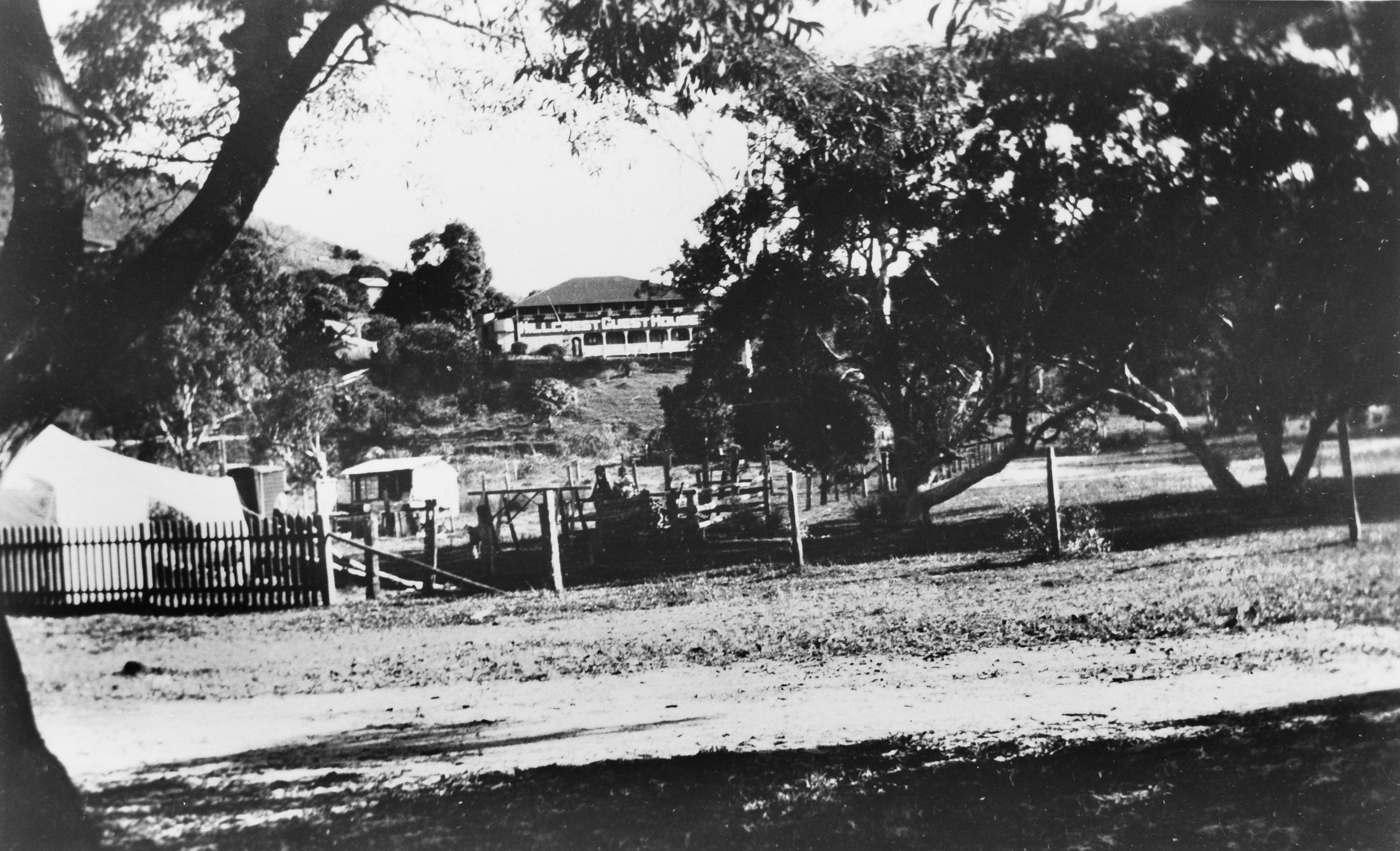
Hillcrest Guest House, 1940

Halse Lodge, formerly known as Bayview, then as Hillcrest Guest House, is a two-storeyed timber guest house which was substantially rebuilt during the 1920s. The site of Halse Lodge has been associated with boarding/guest house accommodation from the early 1880s. Halse Lodge is the only guest house in Noosa Heads to survive from the 1920s and is one of few sites in south east Queensland which has operated continuously as a seaside guest house from the late nineteenth century.

The land on which Bayview was erected was granted to James Forsyth, and comprised 80 acres (32 ha). Title records indicate that although the land was purchased in 1871, the register was not actually signed until December 1880.

The land was transferred to Walter Hay, reputedly Forsyth's cousin, in 1881. According to family records, Hay had moved into the Wide Bay district during the 1850s, and by 1867 he leased the ferry which crossed the Mary River between Maryborough and Tinana. During the late 1860s, Hay moved to Tiaro where he ran a steamer between Maryborough and Tiaro carrying goods for Gympie and Kilkivan. By 1870, a more direct route was sought for the transportation of goods into Gympie, and Hay is credited with successfully finding/marking a route from Gympie to the Noosa River and the subsequent establishment of the town of Noosa. Lands Department records indicate that the name Nusa was used on Ham's map of Queensland published in 1871.

Hay acquired a large amount of land in the Tewantin-Noosa area, and by the 1880s was described as one of the largest land holders in the area. Hay placed an advertisement in the Gympie Times in March 1882, advertising that the house known as Bay View was available for letting. Situated on the South Head at the mouth of the Noosa River, Bay View was described as containing 10 rooms on five acres of fenced-in land.

During the 1890s, the property was leased to Robert Walker, then to Heinrich Walkmann. Bayview was progressively enlarged, and according to local history sources, Bayview was one of two guest houses operating in Noosa by the turn of the century; the other being Laguna House located in Hastings Street. Photographic evidence indicates that by 1900, Bayview comprised a two-storeyed timber building with a detached structure at the rear. It is assumed that this forms the basis of the present building.

Title records indicate that the property was transferred to Charles Miles of Brisbane in 1904, then to Francis Henry Atkinson (Hay's half-brother) in 1910. It is understood that Hay's second wife Susannah assisted Francis to run Bayview. Susannah's involvement however is not recorded on title documents, which indicate that the property was acquired by John Donovan in 1918.

Bayview was substantially rebuilt and extended during the 1920s, after which time it was known as Hillcrest Guest House. The property was subdivided in 1925; Leslie Hay acquired Sub 1 of Portion 171 which comprised just over 11.5 acres (4.7 ha). The property was transferred to John Jones in 1929, and it is understood that the Jones and Hindmarsh families continued to run the guest house until the late 1950s.

The gradual development of Noosa as a tourist resort during the early twentieth century, increased during the 1920s as cafes and accommodation houses were erected along the beachfront (Hastings Street). The rise in car ownership, and increase in the amount of time people had available for leisure during the 1920s and 1930s meant that Noosa, like other coastal areas in south east Queensland, grew in popularity as a focal point for resort and recreation. A 1944 guest book from Hillcrest indicates that guests came from Brisbane, elsewhere in Queensland, interstate and overseas; a number of guests were sufficiently inspired by the house and its setting to record their impressions in verses and sketches.

Hillcrest Guest House was acquired by the Anglican Church in 1959, and renamed Halse Lodge, after Archbishop Reginald Halse. By this time the property included just over 2 acres (0.81 ha) of land. Between 1959 and 1988 few alterations were undertaken to the building, which was used mainly for group accommodation of up to 80 people. Halse Lodge was leased to managers in 1988.

Substantial renovations to Halse Lodge were undertaken in 1988 under the supervision of architects Hurst and Harris, including the additions of a new front entry and kitchen block, demolition and erection of a new ablutions wing, refitting and re-roofing the caretaker's wing, erection of a new activity centre. Minor alterations were also undertaken to the main buildings, including reopening the verandah at the rear of the dining room, and the addition of internal doors to some of the upstairs rooms. Halse Lodge is presently operated as a guest house and has a capacity of around 60 people.

The name of the town was changed from Noosa to Noosa Heads in 1988. As a consequence of the ongoing development of Noosa Heads as a tourist resort, the Hastings Street streetscape and Noosa Heads townscape have undergone many changes, including the demolition of the timber guest houses which formerly lined the street; Laguna House was demolished in the 1960s.

== Description ==
Halse Lodge, a two-storeyed timber guesthouse with a hipped corrugated iron roof, is located on a northwestern rise overlooking Noosa, the Noosa River and Laguna Bay to the northwest. The building is approached via a long driveway from Noosa Drive to the west.

The building has a U-shaped plan with a south facing courtyard flanked by a two-storeyed accommodation wing to the northwest, a single-storeyed caretaker's residence wing to the southwest and a two-storeyed amenities wing to the northeast. The three wings are connected via open verandahs at ground level, and the building has concrete stumps with timber batten infill. The main entry is located centrally on the southwest, with a steep pitch projecting gable above a timber stair and timber ramp entry. The gable has paired corner posts with shaped timber brackets, and a timber batten tympanum.

The accommodation wing has verandahs to both levels on the northwest and southwest. The ground level has a timber batten balustrade, timber posts and shaped brackets, a chamferboard valance, single-skin exposed framed walls, and multi-paned and dual-paned French doors with fanlights. The first floor, accessed via a timber stair on the southwest verandah, has a weatherboard balustrade with open timber batten panels with shaped timber surrounds, timber posts, unlined raked ceilings, single-skin exposed framed walls, and dual-paned French doors with timber batten fanlights. The northeast end of the accommodation wing has the first floor at ground level, with a timber ramp access, and a verandah which has been enclosed with casement windows. The rear wall of this wing has weatherboard cladding, with casement windows with timber and corrugated iron window hoods to the first floor, and a verandah at ground level. A single-storeyed kitchen has been added to the southwest of this wing, and has weatherboard cladding, casement windows with timber and corrugated iron window hoods, concrete block stumps and contains commercial kitchen equipment.

Internally, this wing has a large dining room at ground level, and bedrooms at the first floor level. The dining room has three ante-rooms opening onto the northwest verandah, vertically jointed boarding to the walls, fibrous cement sheeting with cover strips to the ceiling and upper walls, arctic glass to the casement windows and French doors, and a timber batten arch opening to the central ante-room. The first floor contains a central corridor with rooms opening either side, and a foyer area at the northeast with a timber ramp access to the garden. Internal doors have timber batten fanlight panels, and ceilings are boarded.

The single-storeyed southwest caretaker's residence wing has weatherboard cladding, a large metal ridge ventilator, casement windows with timber and corrugated iron window hoods, and a small fenced courtyard at the rear. Internally, it has been refitted and currently contains two bedrooms, a bathroom, office, kitchenette and living area.

The two-storeyed amenities wing has weatherboard cladding and casement windows. Internally, it contains a laundry to the ground level, and bathrooms to both levels.

A high-set activity centre, with a hipped corrugated iron roof and concrete block stumps, is located to the south of the building. This structure is similar in materials and form to Halse Lodge, and has weatherboard cladding, casement windows and a verandah to the west.

The grounds contain mature trees, including a large eucalypt near the western driveway entrance, and a mango tree to the southwest of the building. A terraced driveway and turning area has been established to the south of the building, with the ground sloping steeply to an overgrown gully and creek bed to the south and southwest.

== Heritage listing ==
Halse Lodge was listed on the Queensland Heritage Register on 30 April 1997 having satisfied the following criteria.

The place is important in demonstrating the evolution or pattern of Queensland's history.

Substantially rebuilt during the 1920s, and still in use as a guest house, Halse Lodge maintains its association with the site of guesthouse accommodation in Noosa Heads from the 1880s. As the only extant guest house in Noosa Heads from the 1920s, Halse Lodge is indicative of early twentieth century holiday accommodation, and is important in demonstrating the pattern of the development of Noosa Heads as a tourist resort.

As the site of the former Bayview, Halse Lodge is associated with the Hay family in particular Walter Hay who was active in the settlement and development of the Noosa district from the late 1870s.

The place demonstrates rare, uncommon or endangered aspects of Queensland's cultural heritage.

As the only extant guest house in Noosa Heads from the 1920s, Halse Lodge is indicative of early twentieth century holiday accommodation, and is important in demonstrating the pattern of the development of Noosa Heads as a tourist resort.

The place is important because of its aesthetic significance.

Located in an elevated position overlooking Noosa Heads, this two-storeyed timber building is an important landmark in the Noosa Heads townscape.

The place has a strong or special association with a particular community or cultural group for social, cultural or spiritual reasons.

Halse Lodge maintains a special association with the community, evidenced by the comments in guest books at the Lodge which, over several decades have changed little in their content and express the value and special qualities which Halse Lodge holds for its visitors.
