= Light Sinister =

Light Sinister is a 1938 Australian radio play by Maxwell Dunn. It was one of his earliest works and helped establish his reputation.

The play sold to New Zealand.

The play was produced again in 1941 and 1945.

== Premise ==
""Alf Rackstraw!" said old Joe Cartwright. "You'd say he had no nerves, and so would I. But they found him up on the light platform. He was quite mad. Lost his mind entirely. When they questioned him, he kept muttering over and over—'Seven .. flash .. Four .. flash .. Two .. flash.' " Queer, thought Jim and Sybil Livingstone to themselves. Yes, very queer. But more so when they knew there had been found in the tightly clenched fist of Alf Rackstraw a piece of discolored seaweed that could only have come from the very bed of the sea upon which lay the unfathomed wreck of the S.S. Delhi."
