= The Highest Command =

Radio play by Maxwell Dunn

- Genre: drama play
- Running time: 30 mins
- Country of origin: Australia
- Language: English
- Home station: 2FC
- Syndicates: ABC
- Written by: Maxwell Dunn
- Directed by: Frank Clewlow
- Original release: 30 June 1938

The Highest Command is an Australian radio play by Maxwell Dunn. It was set in China.

The play was popular and later recorded again in Hobart in 1938 and performed again in 1940 and 1945.

== Premise ==
"If you should visit China, and should go to a certain little town, perched, after the fashion of Chinese towns, high on a hillock, in the province of Ho Nan, you might be fortunate enough to meet an old man. He is the Marquis Kai Lung."
