= Airlines of Australia (airline) =

Australian airline, 1931–1942

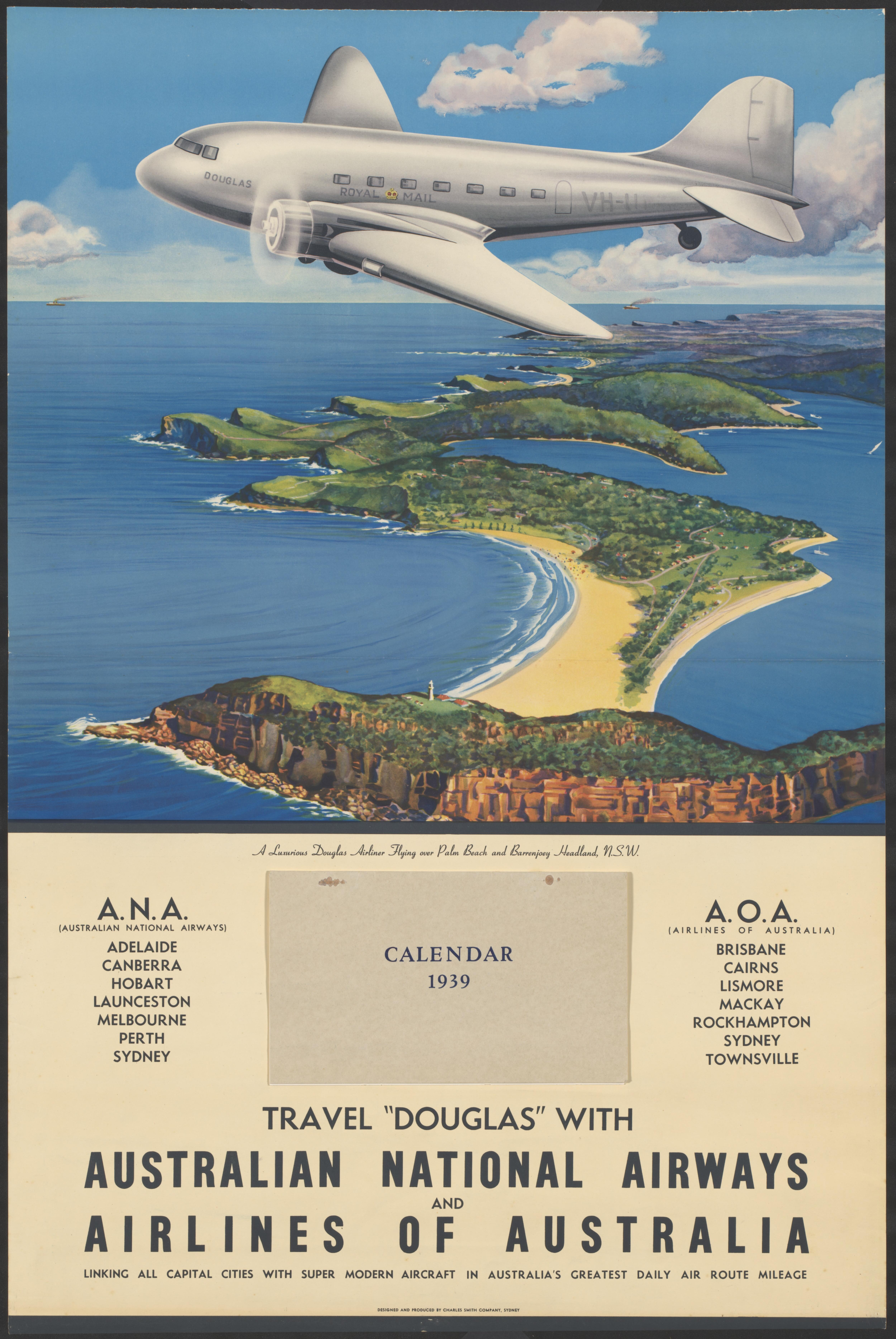
1939 poster advertising the Douglas DC-3's operated by AOA and ANA

Airlines of Australia was an airline that serviced Australia, originally commencing as New England Airlines in 1931, until being absorbed by Australian National Airways in July 1942.

== New England Airways ==
Airlines of Australia was originally incorporated as New England Airways on 1 January 1931, with George A. Robinson as managing director and his future son-in-law, Keith Virtue (1909–1980) as director and chief pilot.

Taking over Qantas' Brisbane to Lismore route, the company first used a four-passenger Mahoney-Ryan B-1 (VH-UIZ) and three-passenger de Havilland Puss Moth (VH-UPM).

Further aircraft were purchased, and more routes acquired and extended.

== Airlines of Australia Limited ==
In October 1935 the new company of Airlines of Australia Limited was floated to replace and incorporate New England Airways. It commenced operations in January 1936. The new company also acquired the rights to manufacturing Sikorsky flying boats.

Australian National Airways (ANA) gained a controlling interest in Airlines of Australia in April 1937, although the two airlines and assets retained separate public identities until 1 July 1942. Their two surviving Stinsons were then renamed VH-UKK Binana and VH-UYY Tokana. Airlines of Australia also held shares in ANA. By 1954, the company was showing a financial loss.

The airline colour was red.

== Aircraft ==
Airlines of Australia owned over twenty aircraft, including:

- VH-UGG Lismore, Stinson Model A tri-motor monoplane, brought from the US to Australia by June 1936, crashing in March 1937 at Archerfield Airport, Brisbane. Crash, killing one pilot and one passenger, involved the right engine.
- VH-UHH Brisbane, Stinson Model A tri-motor monoplane, brought from the US to Australia by June 1936, crashing in February 1937 in the McPherson Range, south of Brisbane. Crash, killing two pilots and three passengers, attributed to wind down-draft in bad weather.
- VH-UKK Townsville, Stinson Model A tri-motor monoplane, brought from the US to Australia by June 1936, was still in existence by March 1945. It was inspected as part of a coronial inquiry investigating the crash of now-Australian National Airways' Stinson A2.W aircraft, VH-UYY Grafton, a fatal crash at Redesdale, Victoria on 31 January 1945, that may have been attributed to a crack in the tail fitting. VH-UKK had developed cracks on two previous occasions.

== See also ==
- 1937 Airlines of Australia Stinson crash
