= There are Three Sisters =

- Wireless Weekly 9 Aug 1939
- Genre: drama play
- Running time: 60 mins
- Country of origin: Australia
- Language: English
- Syndicates: ABC
- Written by: Maxwell Dunn
- Original release: 23 February 1939

There are Three Sisters is a 1939 Australian radio play by Maxwell Dunn.

Dunn wrote the play on the train from Adelaide to Perth. It was very successful and within a year had been produced eight times in different countries.

The play was produced again in 1940, 1943, 1945 and 1949.

A critic from Wireless Weekly called it "original" with "nice construction. I particularly admired the well-timed anti-climax... a very interesting play, with...an overdose of explanatory dialogue, the result of the playwright’s anxiety to leave listeners in no doubt as to his characters’ actions. This was evidenced particularly in the dining-car sequences."

== Premise ==
According to Wireless Weekly "Mr. Dunn presents nothing less than a theory why some people die violently in accidents and why others do not. It is a bold and absorbing piece of metaphysical speculation, given through the story of a tragic train journey from Adelaide towards Perth. One by one we meet the occupants of Car 17—a young honeymoon couple, an old lady going to meet her son, a schoolboy, a judge, a doctor, a professional scoundrel, and so on. The crash comes in a highly dramatic moment as most of them are gathered in a sing-song around the train’s lounge room piano; and the Westland express hurtles to destruction in a washaway. Six out of the ten occupants are killed. On what principle does Death select his victims? That is the intriguing question."
