= Lyric Theatre, Sydney (1911) =

Demolished theatre in Sydney, Australia

Coordinates: 33.88153°S 151.20438°E

Lyric Theatre
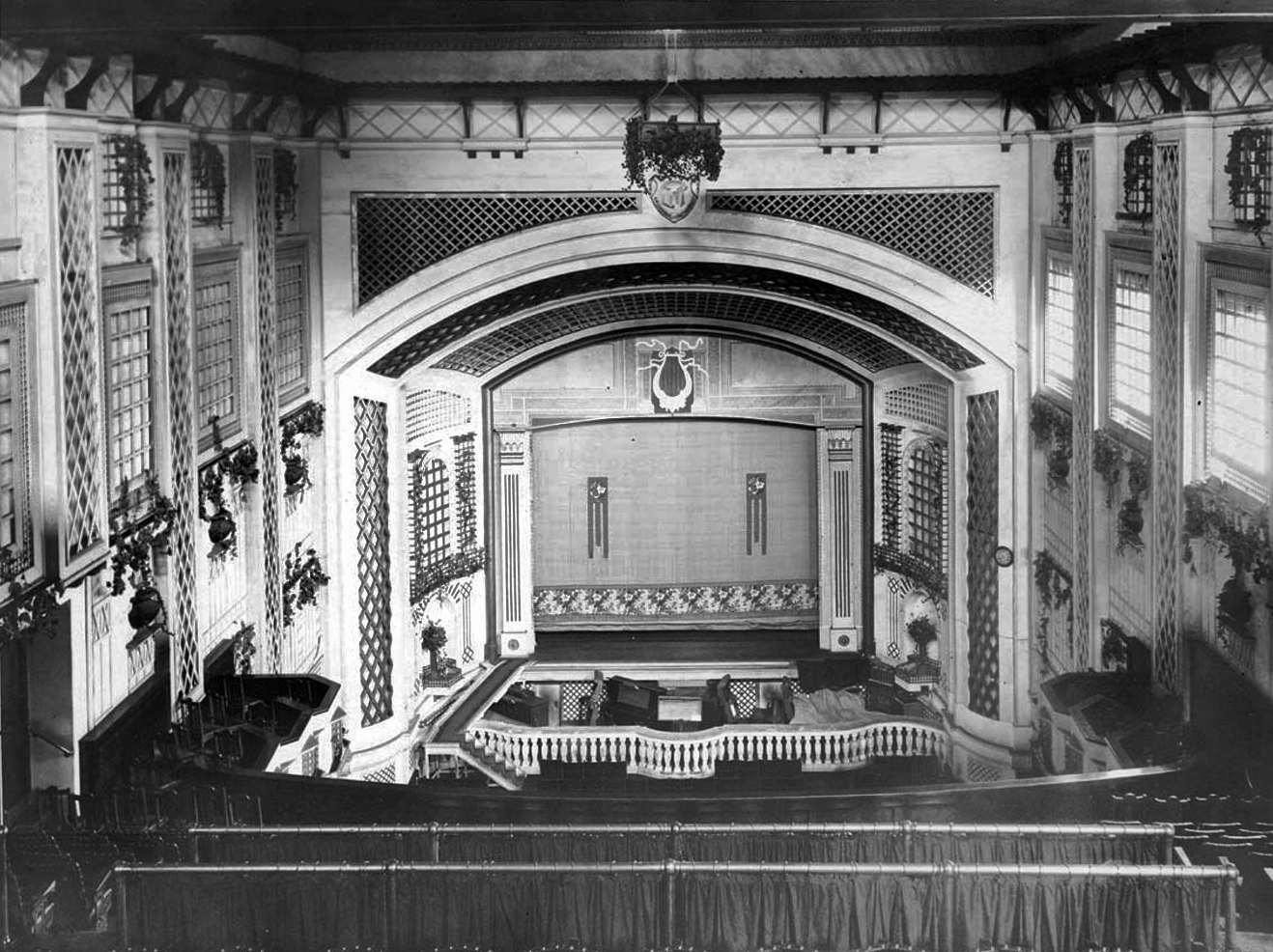
- The Lyric Theatre in the 1920s
- Interactive map of Lyric Theatre
- Address: 749 George Street, Sydney; Sydney; Australia
- Owner: Greater Union
- Capacity: 1915 seats
- Type: Cinema

Construction
- Opened: 1911
- Rebuilt: 1960

The Lyric Theatre was a cinema located at 749 George Street, Sydney and built in 1911. It was later renamed the Forum Theatre and continued to operate until the 1970s.

== History ==
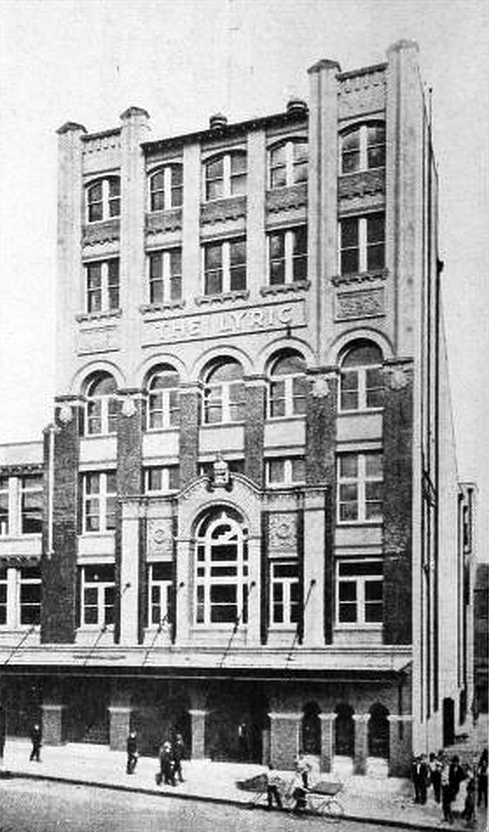
The theatre from George Street

The Lyric Theatre opened on 31 March 1911, at 749 George Street, Sydney, between Valentine Street and Ultimo Road. Built by the American entrepreneur and film director James Dixon Williams, its seating provided for 865 in the stalls, 400 in the dress circle and 650 in the gallery. With its three tiers of seats in the gallery, at the time it was regarded as the largest and tallest cinema in Sydney.

In 1924 the theatre was refurbished and opened as the Lyric Wintergarden Theatre.

Later, Greater Union took over operations of the cinema, equipping it for sound films, with the acoustics being improved by the addition of panels of softwood lattice to the side-walls.

The original, rather plain decor was later replaced with sharply angled decorations in the Art Deco style and the proscenium was simplified.

In the 1950s the Lyric screened many of the Universal Pictures horror films – Frankenstein, Dracula, The Wolfman, The Mummy and The Invisible Man.

In 1946 the Tommy Burns-Vic Patrick fight was screened as a newsreel of the event and became very popular, drawing huge crowds in George Street for the six daily sessions.

On 23 June 1960, the Lyric theatre reopened as the Forum Cinema, with a reduced seating capacity, opening with the film "Porgy and Bess". The cinema underwent extensive remodelling including the closure of its gallery to accommodate the screening of this and other 70mm films. The Forum Theatre was the default epic house for Samuel Bronston's film presenting films such as 55 Days At Peking. The Forum Cinema presented Earthquake in Sensurround showcasing it in 70mm on 20 December 1974.

The Forum Theatre was later demolished and a mixed-use office, retail and residential building named Capitol Terrace now occupies the site.
