= Tommy Burns (Australian boxer) =

Australian boxer (1922–2011)

Personal information
- Nationality: Australian
- Born: Geoffrey Mostyn Murphy; 19 May 1922 Mullumbimby, New South Wales, Australia
- Died: 14 February 2011 (aged 88)
- Height: 5 ft 7 1/2 in (171.5 cm)

Boxing career
- Weight class: Welterweight
- Reach: 72″ (183 cm)
- Stance: Orthodox

Boxing record
- Total fights: 77
- Wins: 62
- Win by KO: 43
- Losses: 8
- Draws: 7

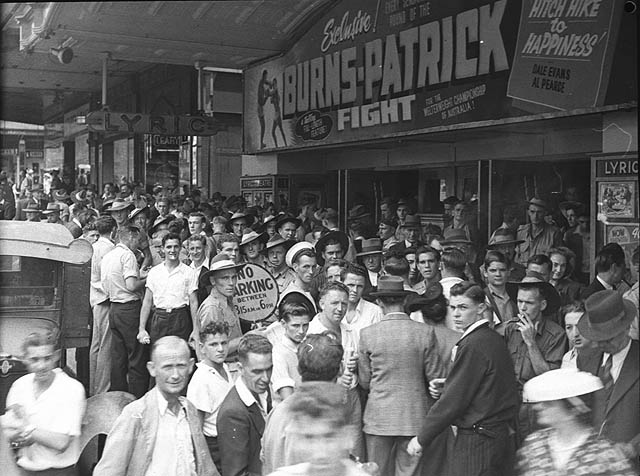
The crowd gathering at the Lyric Theatre, Sydney for the screening of the Burns-Patrick Fight, 1946.

Geoffrey Mostyn Murphy (19 May 1922 – 14 February 2011) was an Australian boxer who fought under the name Tommy Burns (after the Canadian boxer). He was born in Mullumbimby, New South Wales, but spent most of his life in the neighbouring Australian state of Queensland.

Murphy chose his fighting name in honour of the Canadian heavyweight boxer and former world champion, Tommy Burns, who lost his title to Jack Johnson in Australia in 1908.

After his family's bakery failed during the Great Depression of the 1930s, Geoffrey Mostyn Murphy searched various employment. Murphy started boxing in 1936 at the age 14, winning one match via knockout. He then processed to not fight for another two years.

In 1947, he won the Australian Welterweight Championship and fought many of the best Australian boxers of his era, becoming a crowd favourite. He appeared in the 1949 Charles Chauvel Australian movie Sons of Matthew and the radio serial The Winner.

Murphy, as Tommy Burns, was inducted into the Australian National Boxing Hall of Fame in 2004. He died on the 14th of February, 2011 at the age 88.

== Sources ==
- The Australian Film and Television Companion, ed. Tony Harrison pub. Simon and Schuster, Australia 1994

Awards and achievements
Preceded by Bill Lang	Australian heavyweight Championship	Succeeded by Bill Turner
