= Dishonour Be My Destiny =

- Genre: drama play
- Running time: 60 mins
- Country of origin: Australia
- Language: English
- Written by: Maxwell Dunn
- Original release: 1940

Dishonour Be My Destiny is a 1940 Australian radio play by Maxwell Dunn. The play was a biography of William Morton.

It was broadcast in a series of Australian plays and was voted second favourite by listeners and fourth best by judges.

The play was produced again later in 1940 in a shortened version.

== Premise ==
"This play gives the story of the man who achieved perhaps the greatest victory the long history of medicine has known, but whose victory was changed to crushing defeat by the selfishness and ingratitude of man."
