= Maurice Hurst (architect) =

Australian architect (1929–2003)

- Born: 1929; Hastings, England
- Died: 2003 (aged 73–74); Noosa, Australia
- Occupation: architect
- Years active: 1946-2003

Maurice Hurst (1929–2003) OAM, was one of Queensland's leading architects of the Noosa style of architecture. Maurice Hurst is considered a forerunner in Australian architecture. Having trained and worked in England, he then returned to practice his skills in both architectural design and drafting. Not only a style innovator and a conservation pioneer, Hurst acted as a staple of Queensland's domestic architecture for more than half a century. Mostly working in the Sunshine Coast and Brisbane regions, Hurst defined and shaped the area stylistically and spiritually for years.

== Biography ==
Maurice Hurst was born 20 September 1929 in Hastings, England, the son of a publican. Hurst trained at the Brixton and Hammersmith School of Building and Architecture from 1946 where he met friend Bernard Joyce. First developing skills in drafting and architectural annotation, it was during this period that it is believed Hurst developed his trademark sketching style and visualization techniques.

After receiving his Masters from the College of Art and Architecture in 1952, he worked with Joseph Emberton in 1953. Hurst was employed with various commercial architectural firms and practices in London. He completed his British military service from 1953 to 1955, being posted to Egypt where he worked on the Suez Canal with the Royal Engineers. After he completed his military service he worked with some urban planning offices. At the recommendation of his friend Bernard Joyce who was now living in Australia, Maurice Hurst emigrated to Australia in 1958 where he found employment with the architectural firm of Lund Hutton Newell and Paulsen in Brisbane. He settled in Queensland. During this time he was part of design teams who worked on major projects such as the Church of England in Thargomindah (1959) and the new town hall of Gumdale (1960). At Thargomindah, Hurst's team were at the forefront of adaptation of religious architecture using established conventions while acclimatizing to Queensland's tropical conditions. Equally, at Gumdale Maurice Hurst endeavoured to provide a new space for civil function yet still conserving stylistic trends of old.

Many of Hurst's domestic clients during the period 1959–1966 elected to build low set houses with concrete slabs and a minimum of stairs rising to the front and rear. He attributed this to a swing away from the traditional Queenslander style of architecture and the desire to make outdoor living spaces relate to the rest of the home. Hurst also lectured part time in architecture at the University of Queensland, providing design assessment for students in their 4th and 5th year of study. He took a Bachelor of Architecture from the University of Queensland in 1968, with the thesis The role of the Australian professional consultant in the developing countries of South East Asia.

Yet it was during the late 60's and 70's that Maurice Hurst made his greatest impact on the architectural community, specifically in the outer suburbs of Brisbane. Domestic Architecture comprised a fair proportion of Hurst's work with such notable works like the Roe and Frost houses. This period also holds special significance in Hurst's career as it is commonly associated with the genesis of the Noosa style when he commenced work in the area from 1976.

Hurst went into partnership with architect Neil Harris in 1980. They collaborated on a number of homes, schools, libraries and churches on the Sunshine Coast. As a member of the Noosa Surf Lifesaving Association, he also designed the iconic lifeguard tower at the beach at Noosa. Due to Hurst's declining health, the partnership with Harris ceased in 1993 and Hurst soon retired.

In 1996 Hurst was awarded the Architect of the Year by the Board of Architects of Queensland and the State Government of Queensland. In January 2004, Hurst was recognized for his illustrious career receiving Australia Day Honours in the field of Architecture and Social Contribution. At the event Royal Australian Institute of Architect's (RAIA) National President David Parken reflected on Maurice Hurst's career, stating:

"Maurice Hurst was best remembered for pioneering conservation architecture before the term was coined. He produced a new benchmark for sensitive low-scale development in Queensland's coastal resort towns and was a central force in developing an architectural genre, the Noosa style."

== Legacy ==
After a long and industrious career, particularly in Queensland, Maurice Hurst died 13 November 2003. He did not marry and was survived by his sister's family.

In 2004, Hurst was honoured at the exhibition Cool: The 60s Brisbane House, a collection of drawing and models from prominent Queensland Architects of the era.

Hurst's papers are held in the University of Queensland, Fryer Library, including many architectural plans.

== Awards ==
1974 - Citation for Meritorious Architecture, RAIA, Wintzers Restaurant, Brisbane

1976 - Commendation RAIA, Miflin residence, Kenmore

1981 - Citation for Meritorious Architecture, RAIA, own house, Sunshine Beach

1990 - John Herbert Award for Excellence in Heritage Conservation from the National Trust for Halse Lodge in Noosa

1994 - John Herbert Award for Excellence in Heritage Conservation from the National Trust for St Mary's Catholic Church, Maryborough

1996 – Architect of the Year presented by the Board of Architects of Queensland / Queensland State Government

2003 - Order of Australia Medal

== Notable works ==
- Church of England, Thargomindah, 1959

As architects frequently used by the Anglican Church during the 1950s, the firm in which he worked designed many churches of which these are examples – the first often illustrated in Australian architectural histories as an example reconciling traditional ecclesiastical form to the tropics, The second (not realised) in an even more extreme climate has a square plan for changes in liturgy, and multiple roof vents which recall vestments.

- New town at Gumdale, 1960

Hurst worked as the conceptual drawer on the speculative proposal for a new town after British precedents, made at the end of a building boom which started with the lifting of war-time building restrictions and ended with credit squeeze at the end of 1960.

- Roe House, Brookfield, 1963, this low set brick house on a concrete slab was set into the side of a hill. It was designed to make the house complement the natural environment.
- Frost House, Kenmore, 1965, this low set house incorporated the modular window system of Robin Boyd which Hurst further developed into a modular system of walling.
- Karana Downs planned community - 1972–1977
- Fishermen's Village, Tweed Heads
- O'Reilly's Tourist Resort, Canungra
- Nicholsons, Indooroopilly
- The Keep, Kenmore
- Budley, Alexandra Headlands

== Sources ==
- Donald Watson and Fiona Gardner, Well Made Plans, University of Queensland, St. Lucia, 1998
- Robert Riddel, Significant Queensland 20th century architecture: A report, Queensland, 2005
