= The Bush Legend =

The Bush Legend is a 1938 Australian musical operetta by Clive Douglas.

It was used to launch the Tasmanian radio station 7ZR. It was one of the ABC's major productions of the year.

The story was reportedly based on one from Aboriginals in the Weeroona River area.

There were other produdctions in 1948 and it was played for the BBC in 1950.

== Premise ==
"A dramatic impression based on aboriginal folk-lore, and captures the atmosphere of the Australian bush. Woven into it is an idealised conception of the aborigine as he was in ages past. Mr. Douglas has made free use of aboriginal names and expressions both for their euphonious beauty and the added local colour."
