= Bernard O'Reilly (writer) =

Australian writer

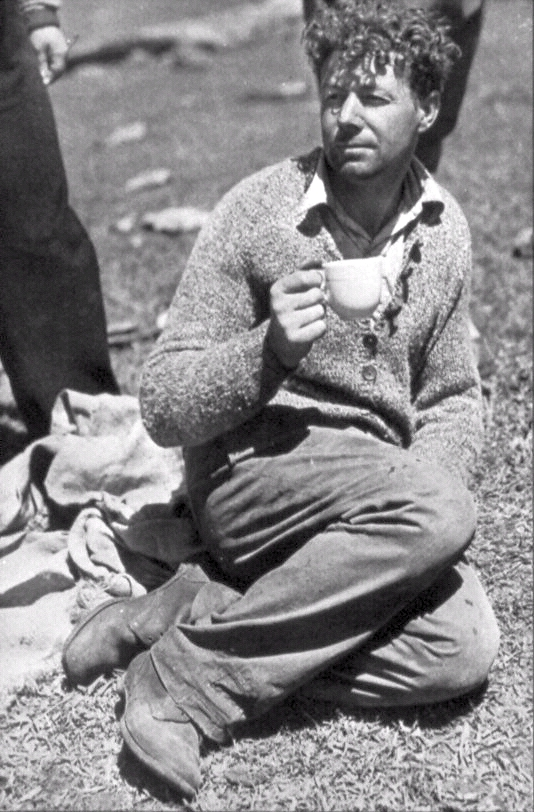
- O'Reilly in 1937
- Born: 3 September 1903; Hartley, New South Wales
- Died: 20 January 1975 (aged 71); Beaudesert, Queensland
- Occupations: Bushman, author
- Known for: Discovering plane crash site
- Spouse: Viola Gwendoline King
- Children: Rhelma
- Parent(s): Peter Luke O'Reilly; Jane née McAviney

Alfonso Bernard O'Reilly (3 September 1903 – 20 January 1975) was an Australian writer and bushman of Irish descent. He was born and raised in Hartley in the Blue Mountains, about 50 kilometres (31 mi) north-west of Sydney and later moved to the McPherson Range near Beaudesert in South East Queensland, Australia. He is part of the family that established the O'Reilly's Guesthouse in the Lamington Plateau.

On 20 August 1931 Bernard O'Reilly married Viola Gwendoline King in Brisbane. They had a daughter, Rhelma.

== Plane crash rescue ==
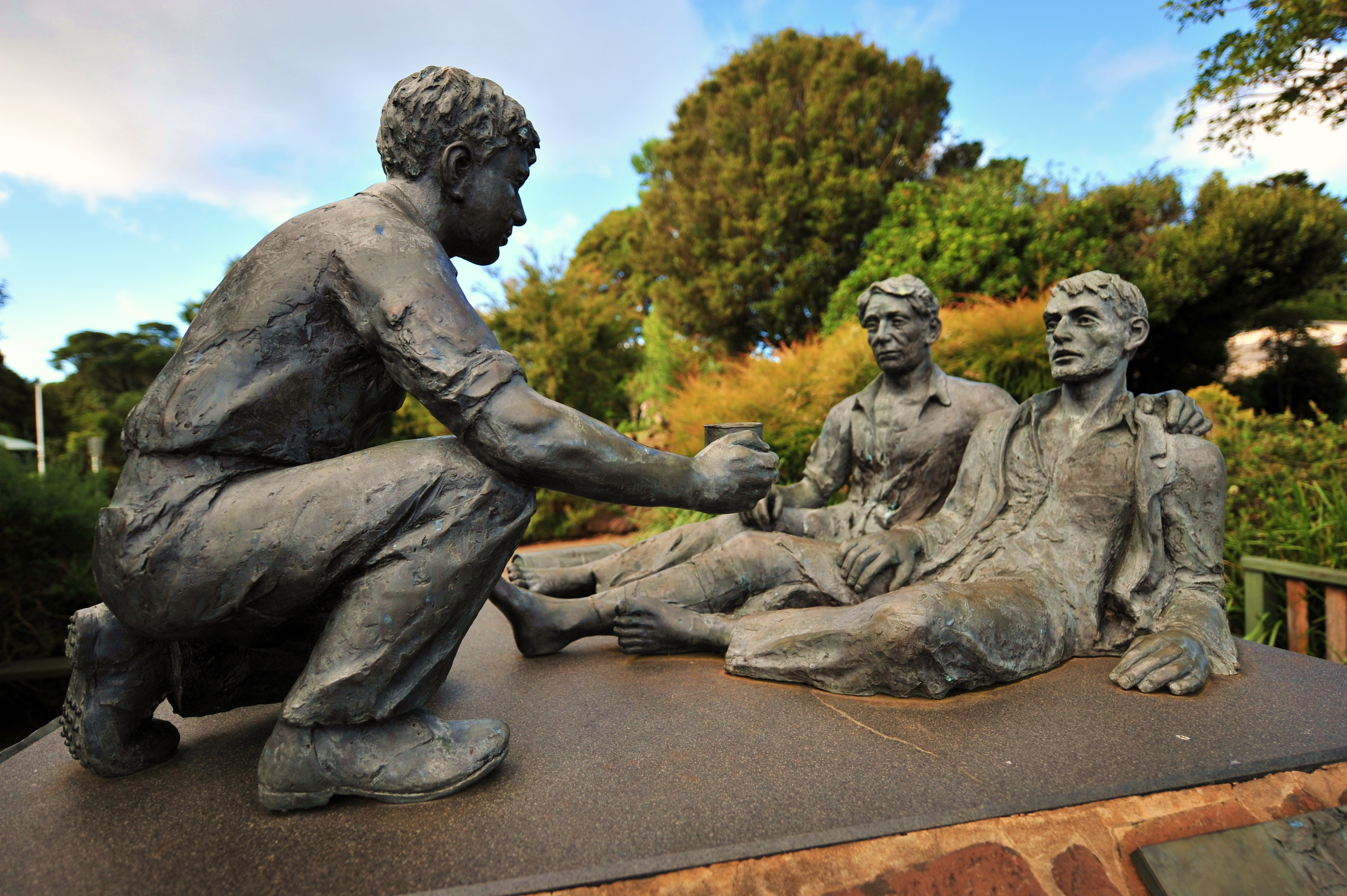
Bronze statue at O'Reilly's Guesthouse depicting the rescue

O'Reilly is best known for the discovery of the 1937 crash site in Lamington National Park of a Stinson Model A airplane, the VH-UHH Brisbane, and the organization of rescue crews that retrieved two survivors. Using his bushcraft and geographical knowledge, as well as inferring from the plane's filed flight plan, O'Reilly found the crash site. On the second day of his search he came upon two survivors and the wreckage of the aircraft in the extremely rugged and mountainous rainforest terrain. He then trekked 26 kilometres (16 mi) through the same difficult terrain to get help and return the next day with rescuers. The rescue operation gained national headlines with reports broadcast live on the radio.

At a ceremony in Sydney, O'Reilly was presented with a plaque and a cheque raised by public subscription. At the ceremony he paid tribute to the two survivors and one of the five victims, Jim Westray, who died from exposure after breaking his ankle and crawling several miles while trying to get help for the others. In years afterward, O'Reilly's nephew, Peter O'Reilly, organized bush tours recreating his uncle's "remarkable feat."

== Published works ==
O'Reilly wrote three books on the theme of Australia's Great Dividing Range, which lies inland from its east coast and is where he lived: Green Mountains (1940, OCLC 29705341), Cullenbenbong (1945, OCLC 12049000), and Over the Hills (1963, OCLC 34825945). The first part of Green Mountains is his own account of finding the aeroplane; the second part describes the O'Reilly family's early years in the Blue Mountains and their move to Lamington. This and Cullenbenong were the inspiration for Charles Chauvel's 1949 film Sons of Matthew. In 1971 he published a collection of poems, Songs from the Hills, OCLC 220025227. The Australian philosopher David Stove has written a short appreciation of O'Reilly's life and books. O'Reilly was played by Jack Thompson in the TV movie The Riddle of the Stinson (1987).

== Later life ==
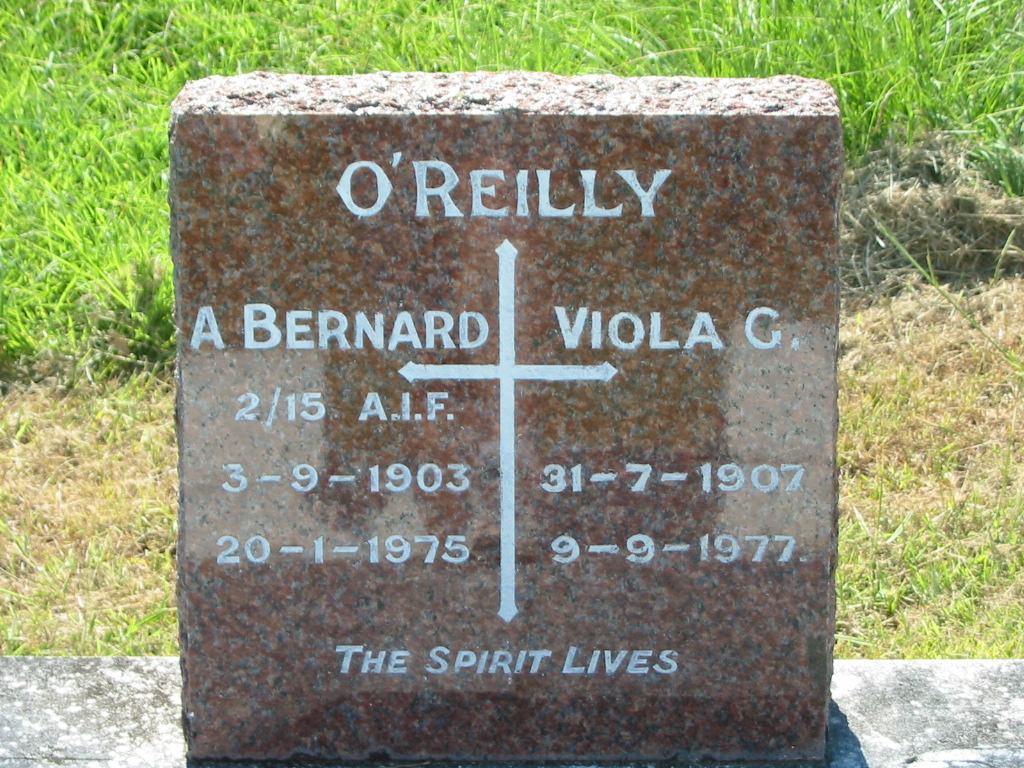
Bernard O'Reilly's headstone, St Johns Catholic Church, Kerry

Bernard O'Reilly died on 20 January 1975 at Beaudesert. He is buried at St Johns Catholic Church in Kerry.
