= Stinson Model A =

American airliner

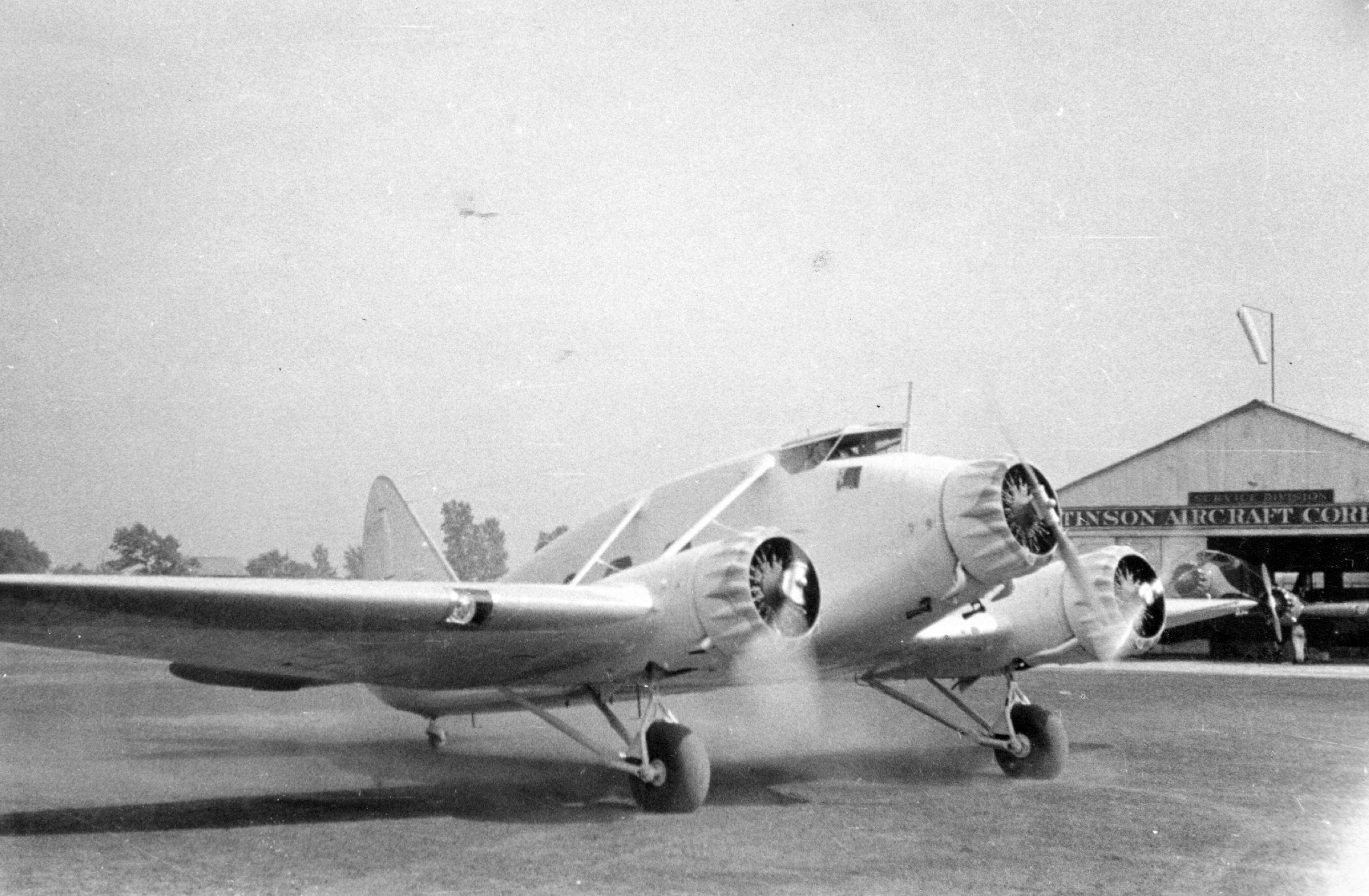

General information
- Type: Airliner
- National origin: United States
- Manufacturer: Stinson Aircraft Company
- Primary user: American Airlines
- Number built: 31

History
- First flight: April 27, 1934

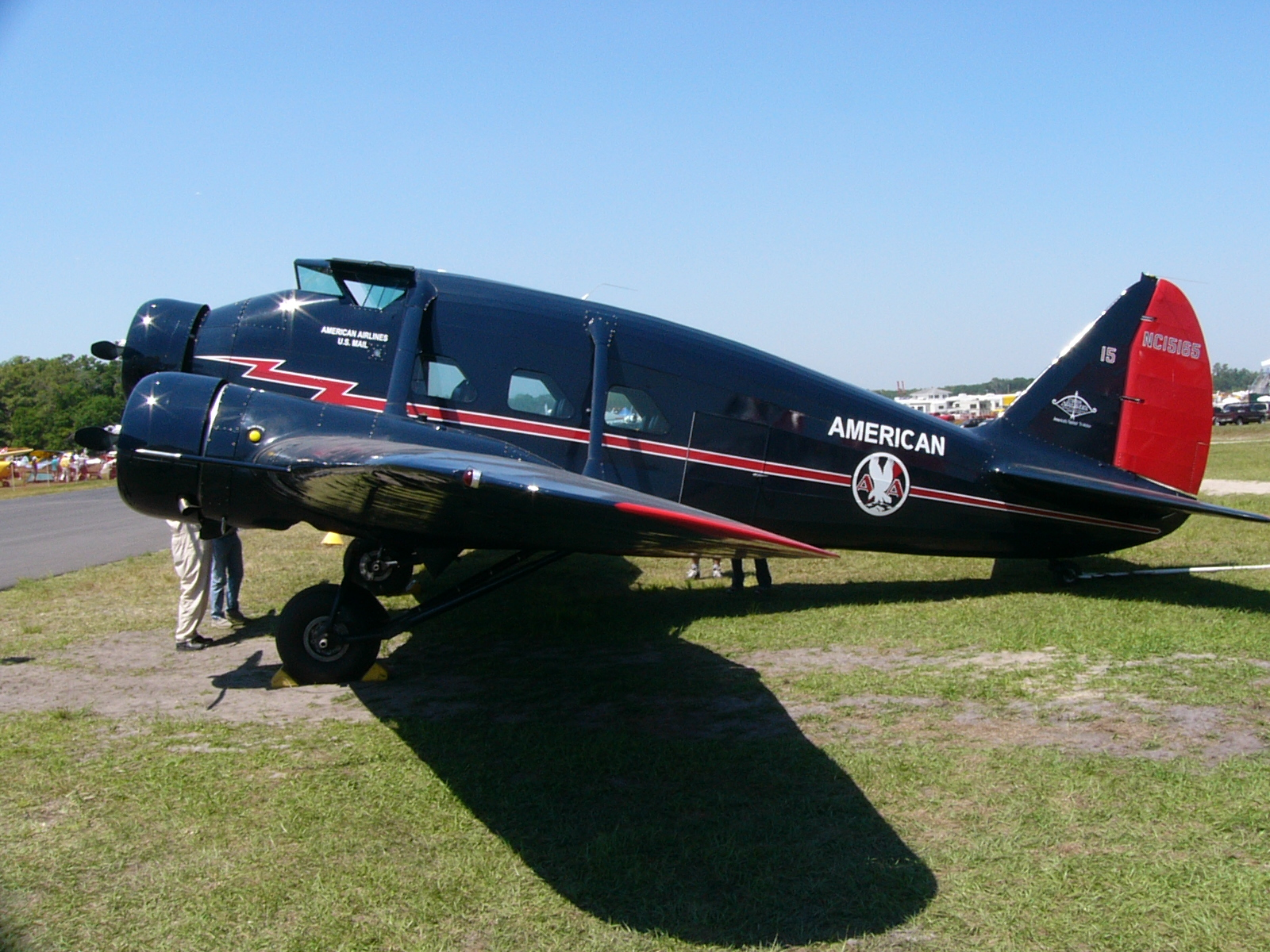
1936 model Stinson Model A at Sun 'n Fun 2006.

The Stinson Model A was a moderately successful airliner of the mid-1930s. It was one of the last commercial airliners designed in the United States with a fabric-covered steel tube fuselage, before the introduction of stressed skin aluminum construction.

== Design and development ==
A total of 30 Stinson Model As were built until production ceased in 1936. It was one of many promising designs, the commercial success of which was cut short by the introduction of the stressed-skin Boeing 247 and Douglas DC-2.

== Operational history ==
=== Australia ===
Because the waiting lists for either the new Boeing or Douglas aircraft were already too long Airlines of Australia (AOA) ordered three Stinson Model As in January 1936. Those aircraft were VH-UGG Lismore (arrived per S.S. City of Winchester on 27 March), VH-UHH Brisbane (arrived per S.S. Wichita on 22 June) and VH-UKK Townsville (arrived 22 July in the S.S. City of Manilla). All three were quickly reassembled and entered the Sydney - Brisbane service, proving so successful that in August AOA ordered a fourth example VH-UYY Grafton – the very last Stinson Model A to be built – which arrived at Sydney on board s.s. Port Alma on 14 December.

With posturing from both AOA and Australian National Airways (ANA) to cut into each other's turf by late 1936, early efforts by ANA to gain a controlling interest in AOA failed, until the tragic losses of VH-UHH Brisbane in the McPherson Ranges on 19 February 1937, and VH-UGG Lismore on 28 March, halved AOA's main-line fleet. A merger took effect in March 1937, although the two companies retained separate identities until AOA was formally absorbed into ANA on 1 July 1942. The two surviving Stinsons were then renamed VH-UKK Binana and VH-UYY Tokana, in conformity with ANA nomenclature.

During World War II spare parts for the Stinsons' aging Lycoming R-680 engines were impossible to obtain in Australia and it was decided to re-engine both aircraft with a Pratt & Whitney R-1340 Wasp engine on each wing and eliminate the engine on the nose. The additional power allowed both aircraft to fly faster and carry heavier loads, although fuel dumps had to be fitted to allow them to remain under their maximum landing weight of 10,750 lb (4,876 kg) in case of an emergency necessitating a landing shortly after take-off.

On completion at Essendon, Victoria in May 1943, Binana returned to the Brisbane-Cairns, Queensland run, while Tokana was similarly converted and re-entered service in October on the run between Melbourne (Essendon), Kerang, Victoria, Mildura, Victoria and Broken Hill, New South Wales. Binana was later transferred to the Melbourne-Tasmania service.

On the morning of 31 January 1945 Tokana was on the Essendon to Kerang leg of its regular service when the port wing separated in flight between Redesdale and Heathcote, 50 miles (80 km) north of Melbourne. The aircraft then plunged to the ground, killing both crew and all eight passengers. An investigation revealed that metal fatigue had developed in the lower main spar boom attachment socket of the wing, the actual failure possibly being instigated by the aircraft encountering a particularly heavy gust of wind. It was the first known occurrence of that type of accident in an aircraft anywhere in the world, but it was to become a problem all too common in later years, when progressively larger aircraft would be built from lightweight alloys that were more susceptible to that metallurgical phenomenon. It was assumed that the same problems could occur in Binana, so its certificate of airworthiness was cancelled and the old aircraft was subsequently broken up.

A non-flying scale replica was built for a 1987 television movie account of the 1937 McPherson Ranges disaster, The Riddle of the Stinson, in which two survivors of the crash were rescued by Bernard O'Reilly.

=== Outside Australia ===
Outside Australia, examples of the Stinson Model A remained in service for some years in such far-flung corners of the globe, such as Korea and Alaska. One example still survives, having crashed in Alaska in 1947. Recovered, and rebuilt in 1979, it passed to the Alaska Aviation Heritage Museum in 1988 and then to Greg Herrick's Golden Wings Flying Museum in Minneapolis, Minnesota. The aircraft is now located at the Mid America Flight Museum-Ohio Wing in Urbana, Ohio.

== Operators ==
Australia

- Airlines of Australia
- Australian National Airways

India

- Tata Airlines - acquired five aircraft secondhand from Marquette Airlines in 1941

United States

- American Airlines
- Delta Air Lines
- Marquette Airlines
- Pennsylvania Central Airlines

== Specifications ==
Data from General Dynamics Aircraft and their Predecessors

General characteristics

- Crew: 2 (pilot and co-pilot)
- Capacity: 8 passengers
- Length: 36 ft 10 in (11.23 m)
- Wingspan: 60 ft 0 in (18.29 m)
- Height: 11 ft 6 in (3.51 m)
- Wing area: 500 sq ft (46 m^{2})
- Empty weight: 7,200 lb (3,266 kg)
- Gross weight: 10,200 lb (4,627 kg)
- Fuel capacity: 220 US gal (183 imp gal; 833 L)
- Powerplant: 3 × Lycoming R-680-5 9-cylinder air-cooled radial piston engine, 260 hp (190 kW) each
- Propellers: 2-bladed propellers

Performance

- Maximum speed: 180 mph (290 km/h, 160 kn)
- Cruise speed: 163 mph (262 km/h, 142 kn) at 5,000 ft (1,500 m)
- Range: 490 mi (790 km, 430 nmi)
- Service ceiling: 17,000 ft (5,200 m)
- Rate of climb: 980 ft/min (5.0 m/s)
