= Maxwell Dunn =

Australian writer and radio producer

Maxwell Dunn (Note: He is not to be confused with the poet, Maxwell Dunn.) (1916-1965) was an Australian writer and producer of radio, films and prose.

Dunn was born in Launceston, Tasmania. He did a variety of jobs, including as an insurance agent and began writing for radio.

Dunn became production manager for the Macquarie network where he wrote and adapted numerous plays, serials and documentaries.

In 1951, Dunn left Australia to become Programme Director of Film Television with the United Nations Organisation. He worked for ten years in New York and New Delhi then returned to Australia shortly before his death in 1965.

Dunn's papers are at the University of Queensland.

== Select credits ==
- Jungle Drums (1937)- radio serial
- Light Sinister (1938) - radio play
- Stateroom One (1939) - radio play
- There are Three Sisters (1939) - radio play
- Dishonour Be My Destiny (1940) - radio play about Thomas Morton
- The Rats of Tobruk (1944) - narration
- When You Come Home (1946)
- Secret Assassin (1948) - radio documentary
- Sons of Matthew (1949) - screenplay
- How They Made Sons of Matthew (1949) - book
- Native Tongue (1951) - radio documentary
- A Tale of Two Islands (1951) - radio documentary
- A window on the sky : a microphone play
- Brief candle : a play for the microphone
- Circumstantial evidence
- Cross roads to nowhere
- Front page lady
- Leave it to the girls
- Satan's quests
- Shadow at my shoulder
- Stateroom One
- The acid test
- The Broken Hill
- The Closed Door
- The Highest Conman
- The sins of the fathers
