= The Riddle of the Stinson =

- Directed by: Chris Noonan
- Written by: Tony Morphett
- Produced by: George Miller; Doug Mitchell; Terry Hayes
- Starring: Jack Thompson
- Cinematography: Geoffrey Simpson
- Edited by: Frans Vandenburg
- Music by: Jim Conway
- Production company: Kennedy Miller Productions
- Distributed by: Network Ten
- Release date: 25 July 1988
- Running time: 109 minutes
- Country: Australia
- Language: English

The Riddle of the Stinson is a 1987 Australian television film about the 1937 Airlines of Australia Stinson crash at Lamington, Queensland, Australia and the rescue of its survivors by local Queenslander Bernard O'Reilly (played in the film by Jack Thompson).

== Plot ==
Queensland, 1937. A Stinson Model A airliner takes off from Brisbane in stormy weather with two crew and five passengers on board, bound for Sydney via Lismore. The aircraft vanishes en route. Officials assume that the pilot had flown east towards the coast to avoid the bad weather, most likely crashing into the ocean and the search efforts focus there. But Bernard O'Reilly, who lives in the McPherson Range, has another theory.

The Stinson, caught in the severe downdrafts from the top of the mountains, has crashed into a thickly forested valley in the McPherson Range. Both of the air-crew and two of the passengers were killed in the crash. Of the three surviving passengers, John Proud has a severely injured leg whilst the others, Joe Binstead and Englishman Jim Westray, have escaped unhurt. Westray volunteers to walk through the valley to get help and he tries to raise Proud's morale by pretending that a town is visible from a nearby look-out and that he will not have to venture far to raise the alarm. Binstead stays with Proud and he finds an intact thermos flask in the wreckage of the aircraft and carries it some distance down the slope to where he can fill it up at a small waterfall and take it back up to Proud, keeping him alive. But Binstead soon grows weak with hunger and fatigue and he cannot keep making trips to fetch water indefinitely.

Ten days after the crash, O'Reilly, an experienced bushman with knowledge of the local weather conditions and the perilous downdrafts, hears a claim from a local who saw the Stinson pass low overhead, obviously struggling in the severe weather. O'Reilly ventures alone into the Range to try to locate the wreckage, not believing that he will find anyone still alive. After trekking for a day, he arrives at a crest above the valley and sees a small patch of brown amongst the trees on the opposite side. Although it would most likely be a small burnt area caused by a lightning strike, O'Reilly nonetheless struggles through the thick undergrowth of the valley floor to reach the location. He finds Proud and Binstead, cold and starved, but alive. O'Reilly carries water to the two men, builds a fire and leaves all of his food and then begins the hike back to fetch help. En route, he discovers the corpse of Westray who had fallen on slippery rocks and had died of his injuries. O'Reilly makes it out of the valley and alerts the local community. He leads a large rescue party back to the crash site and the two survivors are carried out to safety. O'Reilly is praised for his heroism but he says that the real credit should go to Westray and Binstead. Uncomfortable with his newfound celebrity status, O'Reilly, with his wife, watches a newsreel of the rescue. He leaves the theatre early before anyone can recognise him.

== Cast ==
- Jack Thompson as Bernard O'Reilly
- Helen O'Connor as Viola O'Reilly
- Norman Kaye as Binstead
- Richard Roxburgh as Proud
- Huw Williams as Westray
- Dennis Miller as Flight Captain Rex Boyden
- Mark Lee as Co-Pilot Bert Shepherd
- Susan Lyons as Jean Batten
- Frank Wilson as Robinson
- Esben Storm as Meissner

== Production ==
Jim Conway wrote a memorable harmonica music score. According to one critic "the harmonica overlays shots of the mist-shrouded rainforest, personalising the bush, giving it a haunting, threatening quality, and a sense of isolation." Conways brother, Mic Conway has a short walk on walk off role early in the film. Both Conways found fame in the seventies in their off beat band Capt Matchbox.

The movie marked a return to leading roles in Australian films for Jack Thompson.

== Reception ==
The show earned 26 ratings points on its premiere, coming second on its night to a John Farnham Age of Reason concert at World Expo. According to The Sydney Morning Herald "this was an excellent performance by the Stinson, which had been widely regarded in the industry as flying against impossible odds."
