= Mount French (Queensland) =

Mountain in the country of Australia

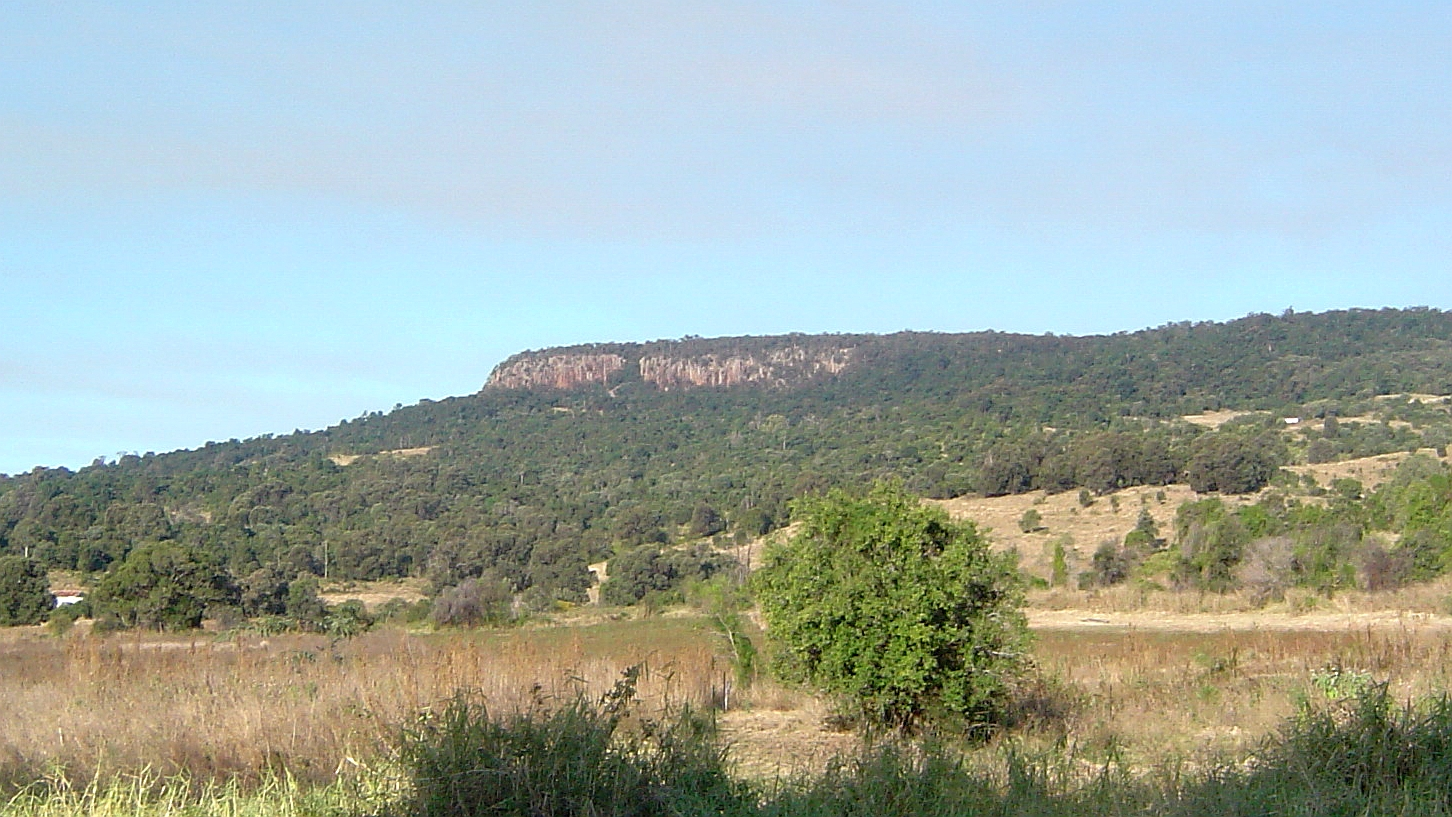
- Frog Buttress cliff, 2011

Highest point
- Elevation: 579 m (1,900 ft)
- Coordinates: 28°00′S 152°37′E

Geography
- Location within Queensland
- Location: Queensland, Australia
- Parent range: Moogerah Peaks

Geology
- Rock age: 22 million years
- Mountain type: Volcanic plug

Mount French is a mountain in South East Queensland, Australia. The mountain rises 579 m above sea level and is part of the Moogerah Peaks National Park. It lies approximately 100 km west of Brisbane in the locality of Mount French west of the town of Boonah in the Scenic Rim Region. Other prominent peaks in the Scenic Rim group of mountains include Mount Edwards, Mount Moon and Mount Greville.

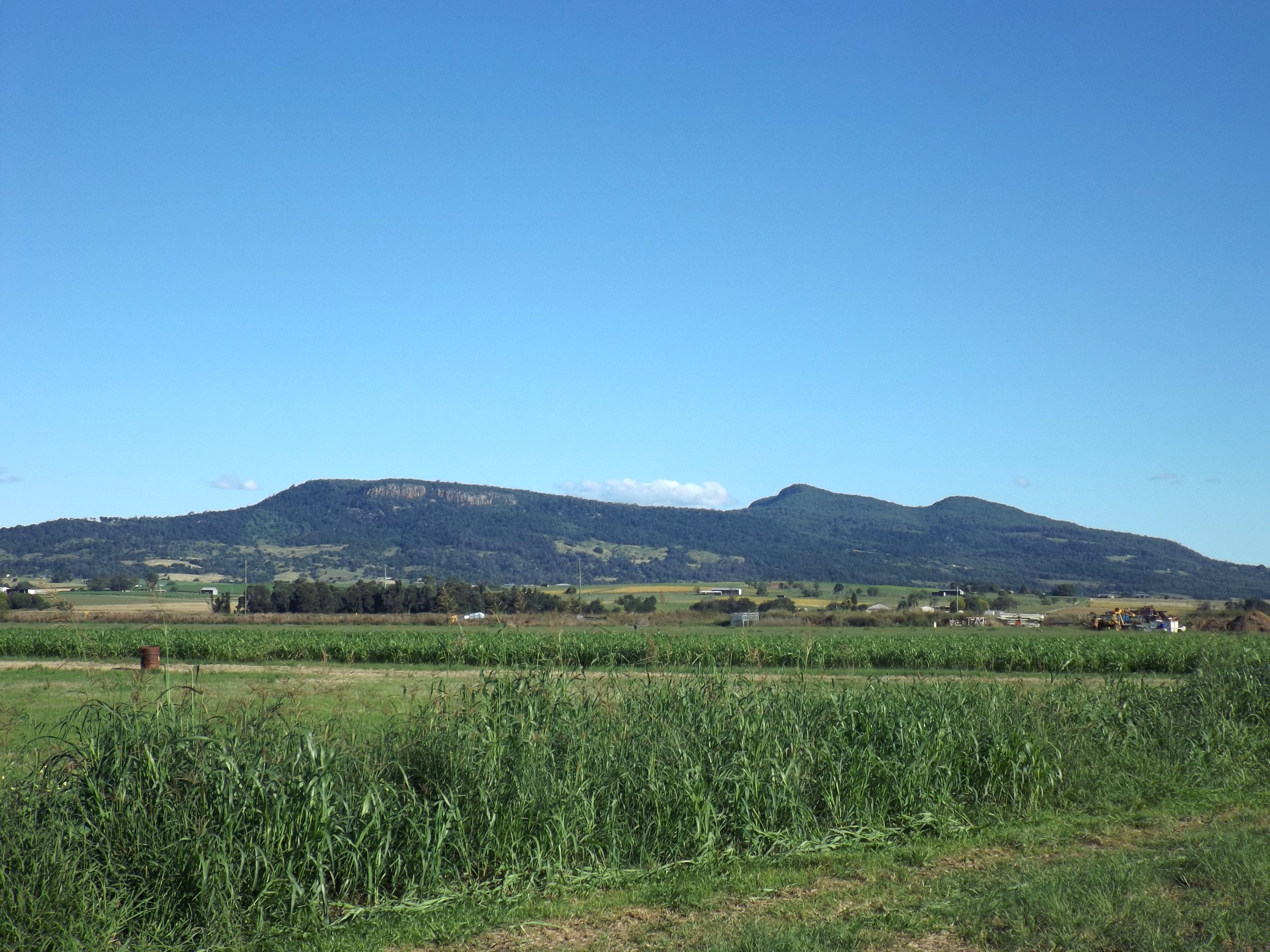
View from Kents Lagoon, 2015

The traditional owners of the mountain, the Ugarapul people, named the two peaks Punchagin (the southern peak) and Mee-bor-rum (the northern peak).

In 1827, Patrick Logan named the peak Mount Dumaresq. The name was changed after Allan Cunningham named another mountain with the same name, coincidentally on the same day.

It is best known as a popular destination for rockclimbers and is the home of Frog Buttress. It was first developed by Rick White and company during the late 1960s and 1970s. There are also some easy walks around the top of the cliffs from the picnic area. One track leads to the constructed lookout called Logans Lookout which overlooks the Fassifern Valley.

Access to the mountain top is via sealed road. There are numerous self-registration camping sites, barbecues places, picnic tables, a single block of toilets, a car park and tap water is provided.

== See also ==
- List of mountains in Australia
