= Clunie (disambiguation) =

Clunie is a small Scottish settlement.

Clunie may also refer to:

- Clunie (surname)
- Loch of Clunie, Scotland
- Clunie Water, a river of Aberdeenshire, Scotland
- Mount Clunie, Mount Clunie National Park, New South Wales, Australia

== See also ==
- Cluny (disambiguation)
