= Mount Greville =

Mountain in the country of Australia

- Meebatboogan
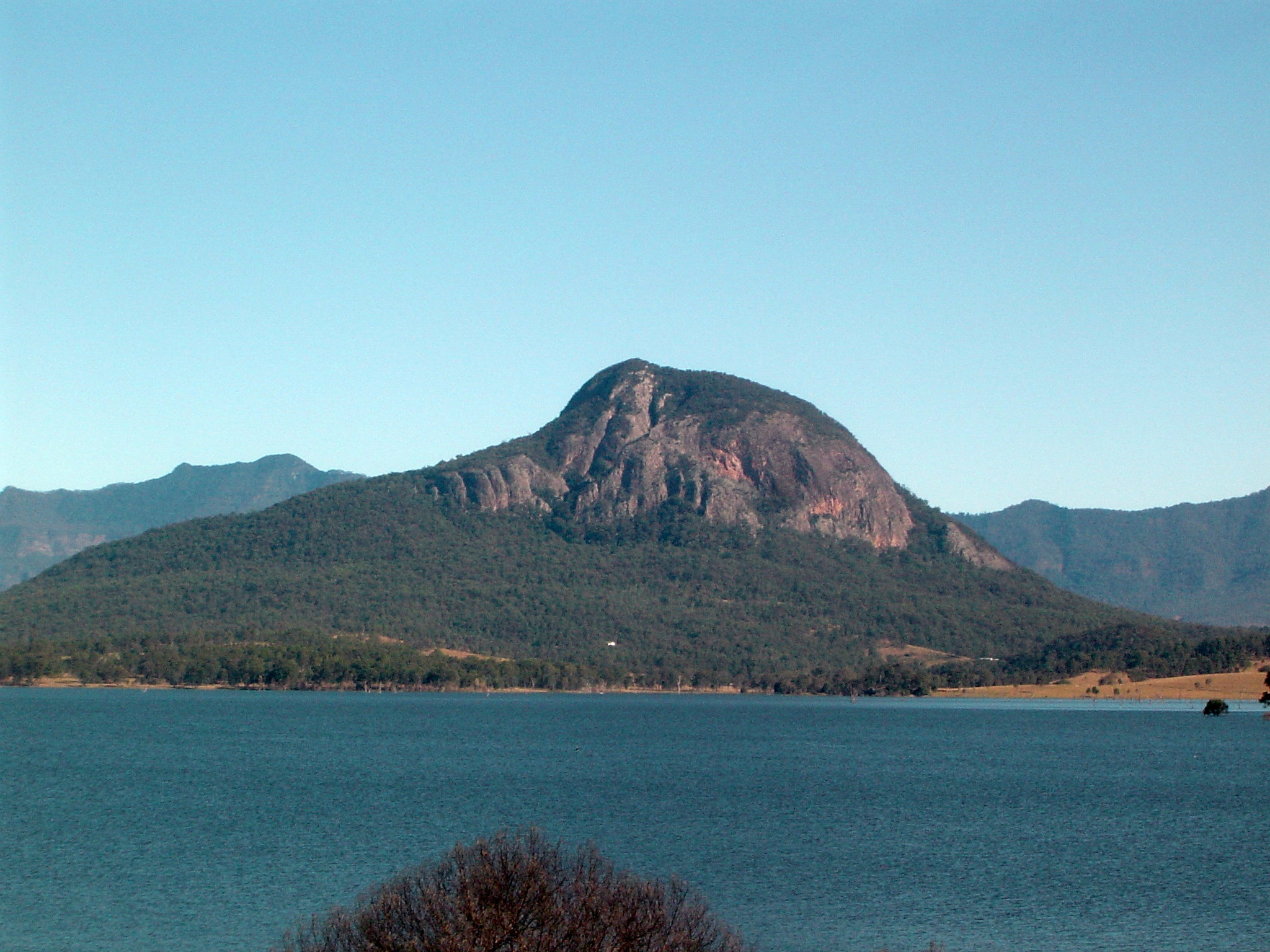
- Mount Greville viewed from Lake Moogerah

Highest point
- Elevation: 772 m (2,533 ft)
- Listing: Mountains of Australia
- Coordinates: 28°04′28″S 152°30′10″E

Geography
- Location within Queensland
- Location: Queensland, Australia
- Parent range: Moogerah Peaks

Geology
- Rock age: 23 million years
- Mountain type: Volcanic plug

Climbing
- Easiest route: South-east track

Mount Greville is a cone-shaped and deeply fissured mountain in South East Queensland, Australia. The mountain rises 720 m above sea level and is part of the Moogerah Peaks National Park. It lies approximately 100 km (62 mi) south west of Brisbane just outside the town of Boonah. Other prominent peaks in this Scenic Rim group of mountains includes Mount Edwards, Mount Moon and Mount French.

The local Uragapul people call this mountain, Meebatboogan, meaning place where the eagles rest. In 1828, the mountain was named after the Scottish botanist Robert Kaye Greville by the European explorer Allan Cunningham.

Palm Gorge is situated on Mount Greville. This narrow gorge contains a nearly pure stand of Piccabeen Palms.

The easiest path to the summit is via the south-eastern track which passes through stands of Eucalyptus dura at higher altitudes. After rain, climbing the mountain can be dangerous due to slippery rocks and the path's proximity to sheer cliffs.
