= Mount Edwards (Queensland) =

Mountain in the country of Australia

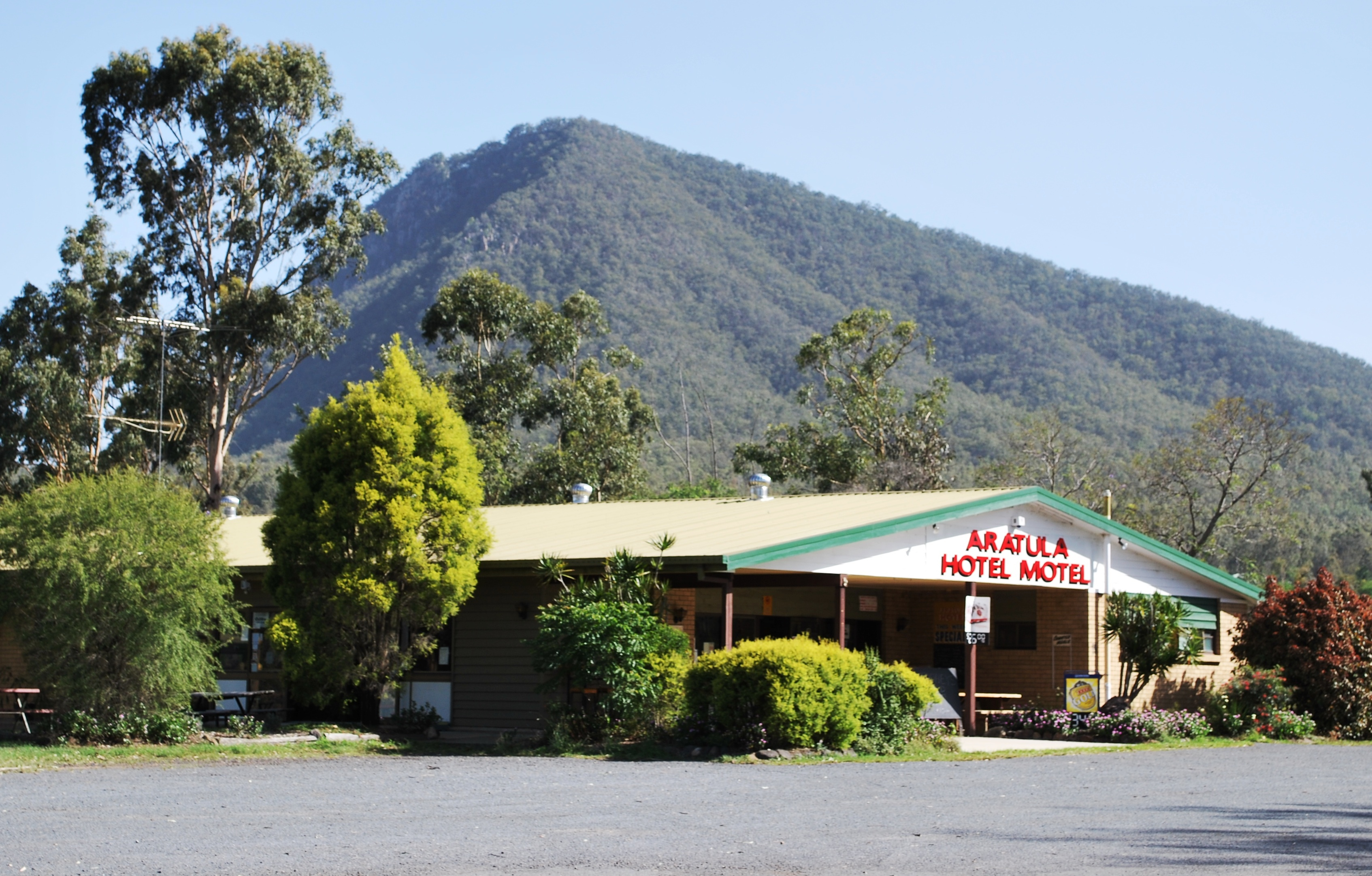
- Mount Edwards behind the Aratula Hotel

Highest point
- Elevation: 634 m (2,080 ft)
- Coordinates: 28°00′59″S 152°33′00″E

Geography
- Location within Queensland
- Location: Queensland, Australia
- Parent range: Moogerah Peaks

Geology
- Rock age: 23 million years
- Mountain type: Volcanic plug

Climbing
- Easiest route: Walking track

Mount Edwards is a mountain in South East Queensland, Australia.

== Geography ==
The mountain rises 634 metres (2,080 ft) above sea level and is part of the Moogerah Peaks National Park. It lies within its namesake locality Mount Edwards, approximately 100 km south west of Brisbane approximately 17 km (10.5 mi) from the town of Boonah. The mountain is the closest of the Moogerah Peaks to the Cunningham Highway and is 9 km south of Aratula. Other prominent peaks in this Scenic Rim group of mountains includes Mount French, Mount Moon and Mount Greville.

== History ==
Explorer John Oxley named the mountain Mount Banister in 1824. Later renamed in 1828 by Alan Cunningham after Lieutenant George Edwards.

The Indigenous name, given by the Yugara people, is Wummun.

== Accessing the summit ==
The summit is accessed by walking track that starts across the Moogerah Dam wall. The 2.7 km walk to the top affords views across Fassifern Valley.

=== Reynolds Creek ===
Between Mount Edwards and Little Mount Edwards (363 m) to the east, is Reynolds Creek which flows through a steeply sloped gorge.

== See also ==
- List of mountains in Australia
