= Clooney =

Clooney may refer to:

== People ==
- Clooney (surname)

== Places ==
- Clooney, Bunratty Upper, a civil parish and townland in the Barony of Bunratty Upper, County Clare, Ireland
- Clooney, Corcomroe, a civil parish and townland in the Barony of Corcomroe, County Clare, Ireland
- Clooney, Kilcronaghan civil parish, a townland in County Londonderry, Northern Ireland

== See also ==
- Cluny (disambiguation)
