= Moogerah Peaks National Park =

National park in Queensland, Australia

- IUCN category II (national park)
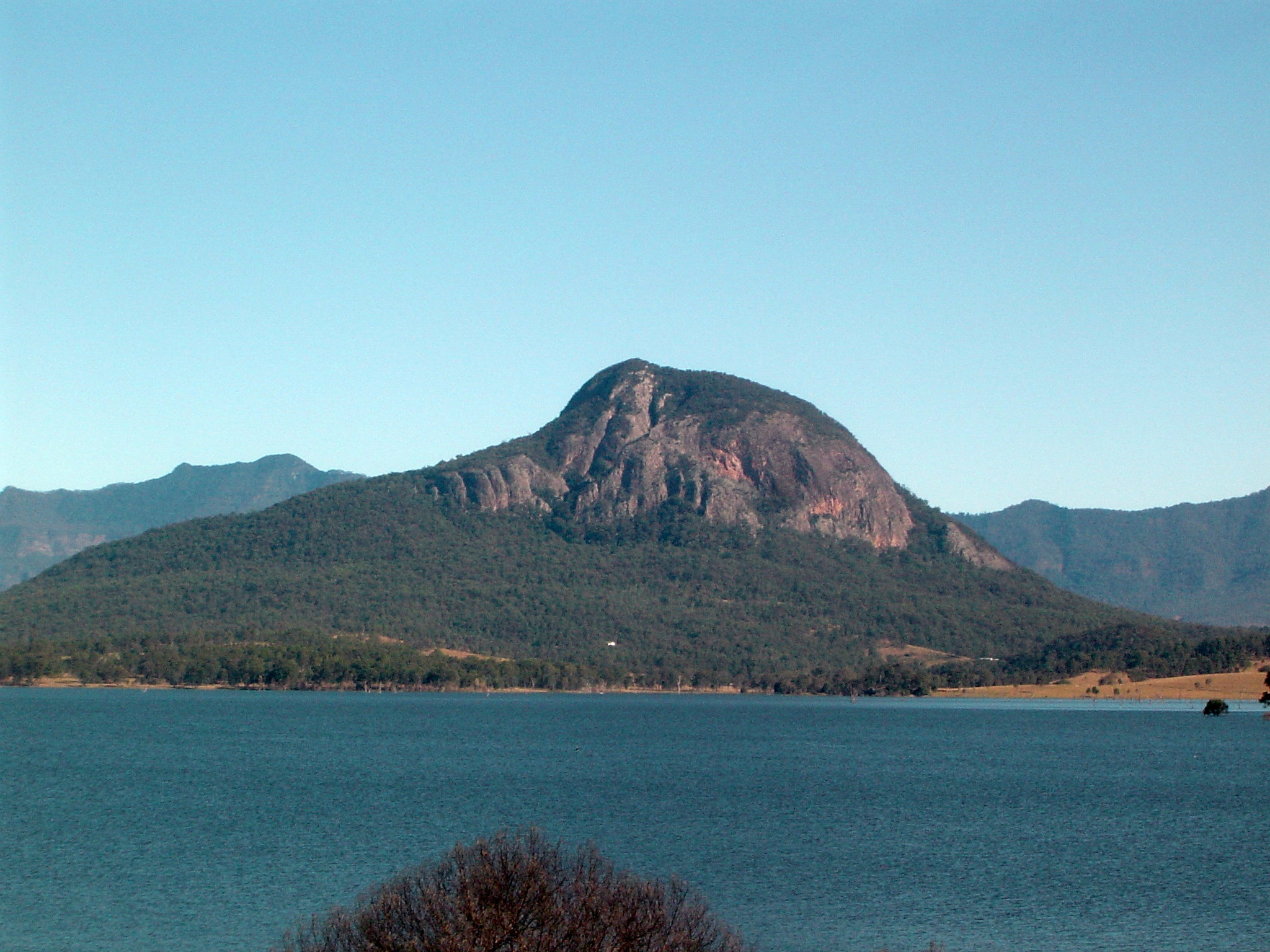
- Mount Greville and Lake Moogerah, 2011

- Location within Queensland
- Location: Queensland
- Coordinates: 27°59′04″S 152°37′05″E
- Area: 9.27 km^{2} (3.58 sq mi)
- Established: 1982
- Governing body: Queensland Parks and Wildlife Service
- Website: Official website

Moogerah Peaks is a National Park in the Fassifern Valley of South East Queensland, Australia, located approximately 70 km south west of the state capital Brisbane. The 676-hectare park consists of four separate protected areas which surround volcanic peaks and rocky cliffs near Moogerah Dam.

== Environment ==
Because the peaks are relatively inaccessible the natural vegetation of the area has remained intact. The vegetation is mostly open eucalypt forest with montane heath on exposed rock faces. In sheltered areas there are some patches of rainforest. The park is part of the Scenic Rim Important Bird Area, identified as such by BirdLife International because of its importance in the conservation of several species of threatened birds.

== Moogerah Peaks ==
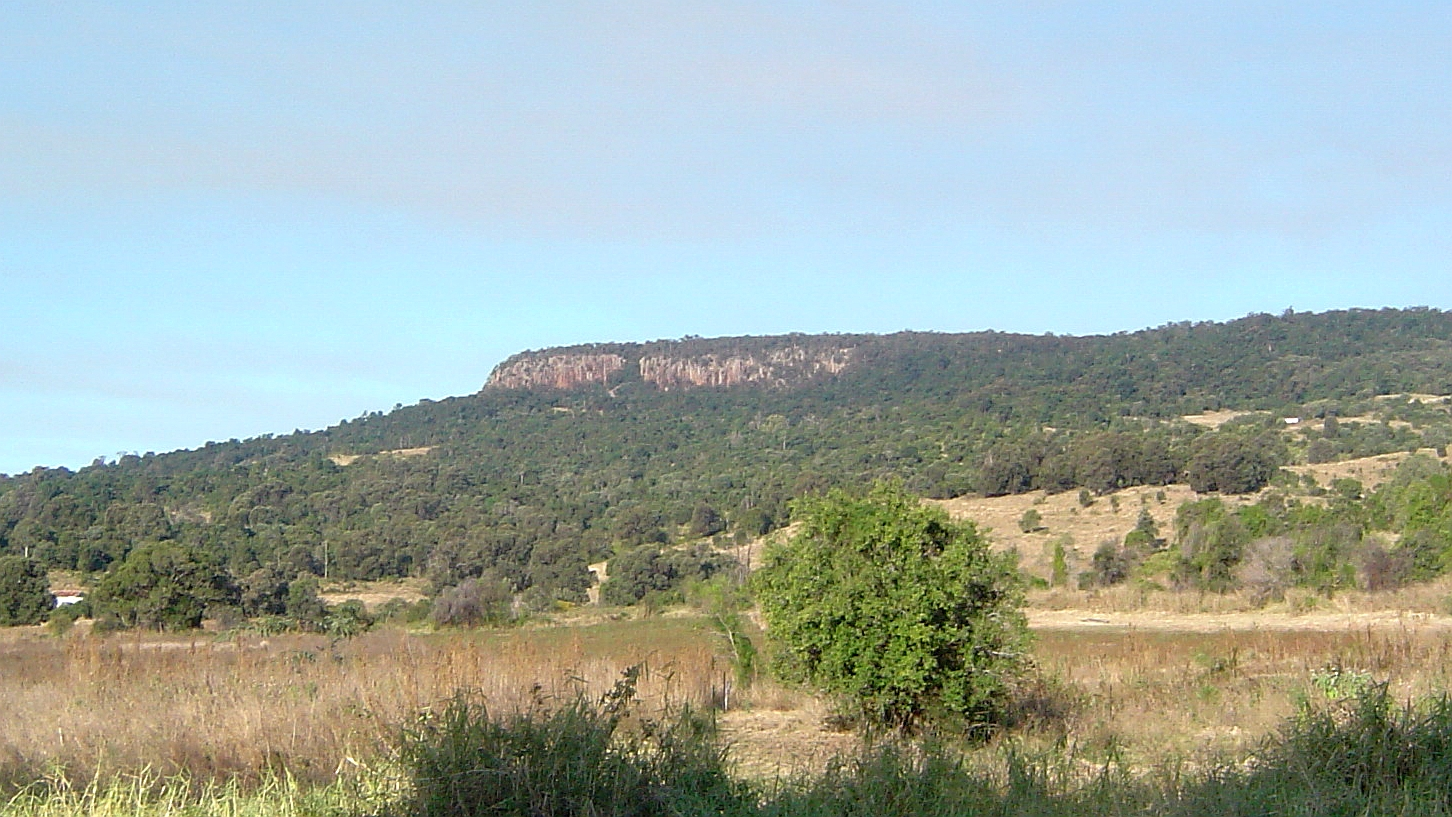
Frog Buttress cliff on Mount French, 2011

The Moogerah Peaks are a small set of mountains with a volcanic origin. The summits of Mount French, Mount Edwards, Mount Moon and Mount Greville are each contained within four separate sections of the park.

On Mount French the cliffs at Frog Buttress are one of the state's most popular areas for rockclimbers. The National Park surrounds Lake Moogerah, and access to the Mount Edwards portion of the park can be had across the dam wall and spillway of the lake.

Palm Gorge is situated on Mount Greville. This narrow gorge contains a nearly pure stand of Piccabeen Palms. To the west and south of this park lies the Main Range National Park preserving part of the Scenic Rim. The flora of the peaks is diverse including rainforests, sclerophyll woodlands and montane heath in the rocky exposed areas. Endemic vegetation species occur on the peaks that can be found nowhere else on earth, such as the Moogerah Peaks Leionema and Mount Greville Reed Grass.

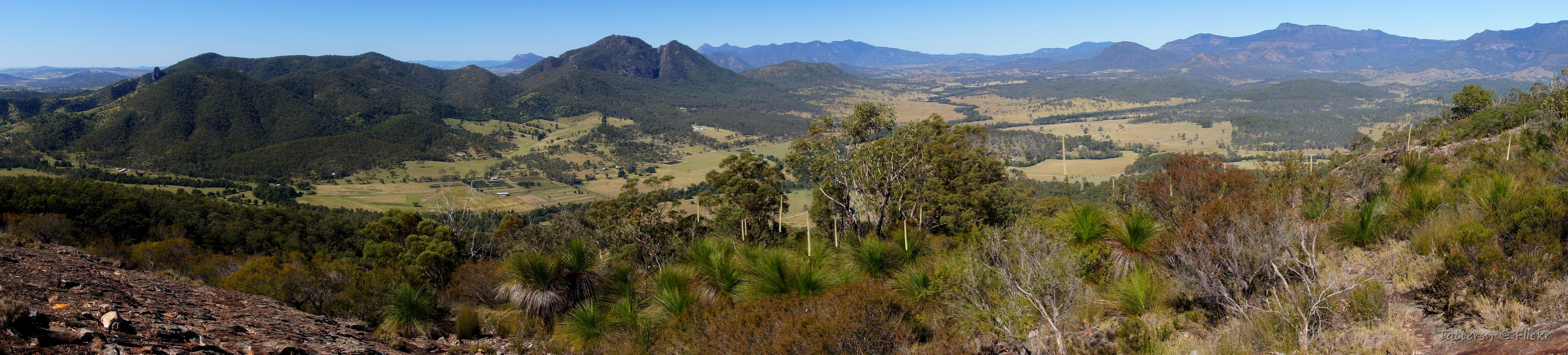
View from Mount Greville

== See also ==
- Protected areas of Queensland
