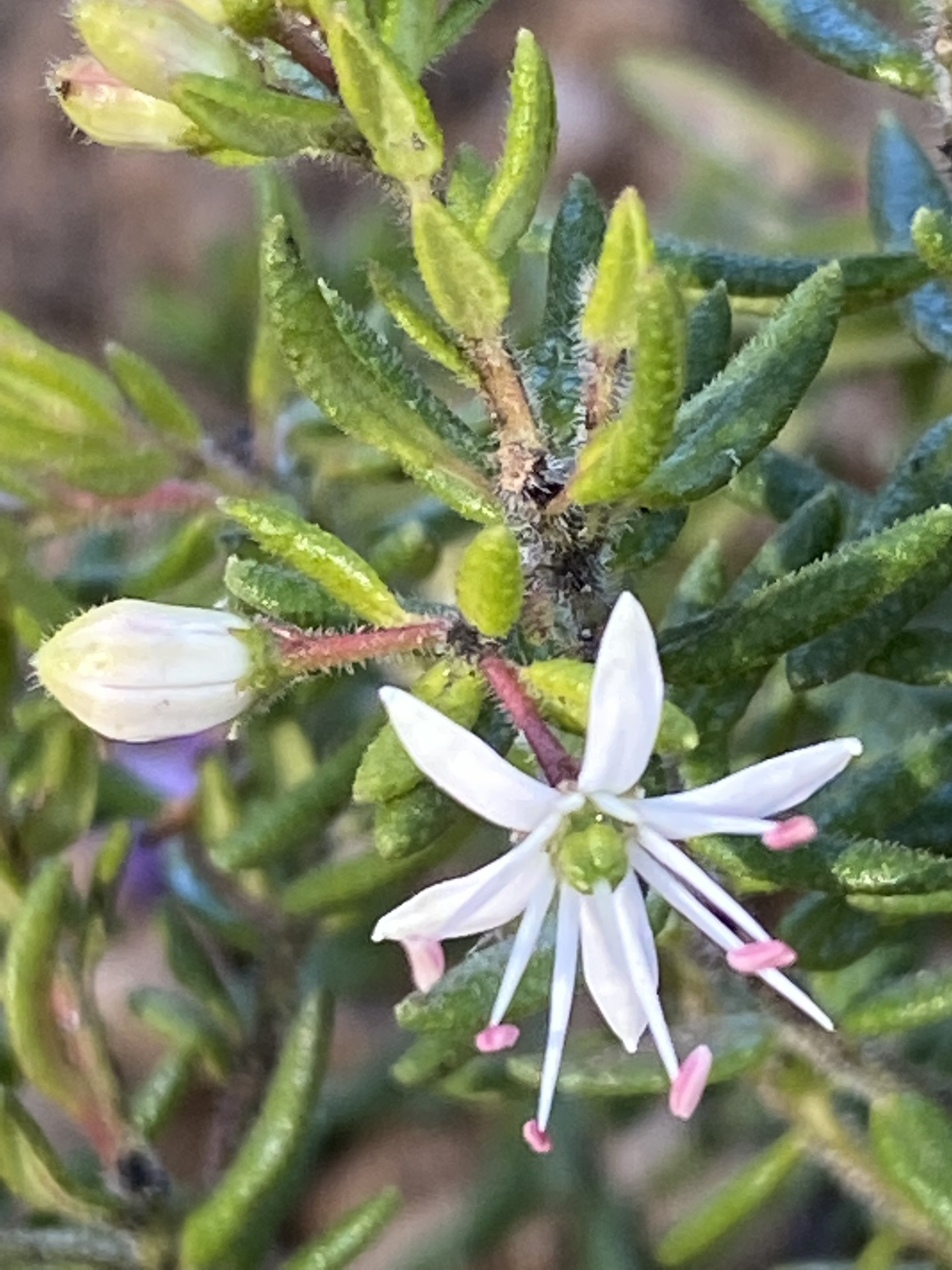

Scientific classification
- Kingdom: Plantae
- Clade: Tracheophytes
- Clade: Angiosperms
- Clade: Eudicots
- Clade: Rosids
- Order: Sapindales
- Family: Rutaceae
- Genus: Leionema
- Species: L. gracile

Binomial name
- Leionema gracile (C.T.White) Paul G.Wilson

= Leionema gracile =

Mt Greville phebalium

Species of shrub

Leionema gracile, commonly known as Mt Greville phebalium, is a shrub species that is endemic to Queensland, Australia. It is a small shrub with spreading leaves, white petals and flowers from autumn to spring.

== Description ==
Leionema gracile is a small shrub to 1.5 m (4 ft 11 in) high, branchlets warty, more or less terete or marginally angular with separated, soft, thin hairs between the ribs. The leaves are a spreading formation, mostly smooth, oval to elliptic-oval, 5–10 mm (0.20–0.39 in) long, 1.5–2.5 mm (0.059–0.098 in) wide, edges smooth and slightly rolled under, leathery, and blunt or rounded at the apex. The single flowers are borne in the highest branches in leaf axils on mostly smooth pedicel about 0.5 mm (0.020 in) long. The small bracts are hair-like about 0.5 mm (0.020 in) long and fall off early. The calyx lobes are triangular shaped and smooth. The white flower petals are spreading, narrowly oval, 5 mm (0.20 in) long and sharply pointed at the apex, stamens similar length of petals. The fruit are about 4 mm (0.16 in) long ending with a short beak. Flowering occurs from autumn to spring.

== Taxonomy and naming ==
Mt Greville phebalium was first formally described as Phebalium gracile, but the name was changed to Leionema gracile in 1998 by Paul G. Wilson and the description was published in the journal Nuytsia. The specific epithet (gracile) is from the Latin gracilis meaning thin or slender.

== Distribution and habitat ==
This species has a restricted distribution found growing at higher altitudes on Mount Moon and Mount Greville in south-eastern Queensland on rocky outcrops.
