= Frog Buttress =

Cliff in Queensland, Australia

Coordinates: 27°59′02.56″S 152°37′17.48″E

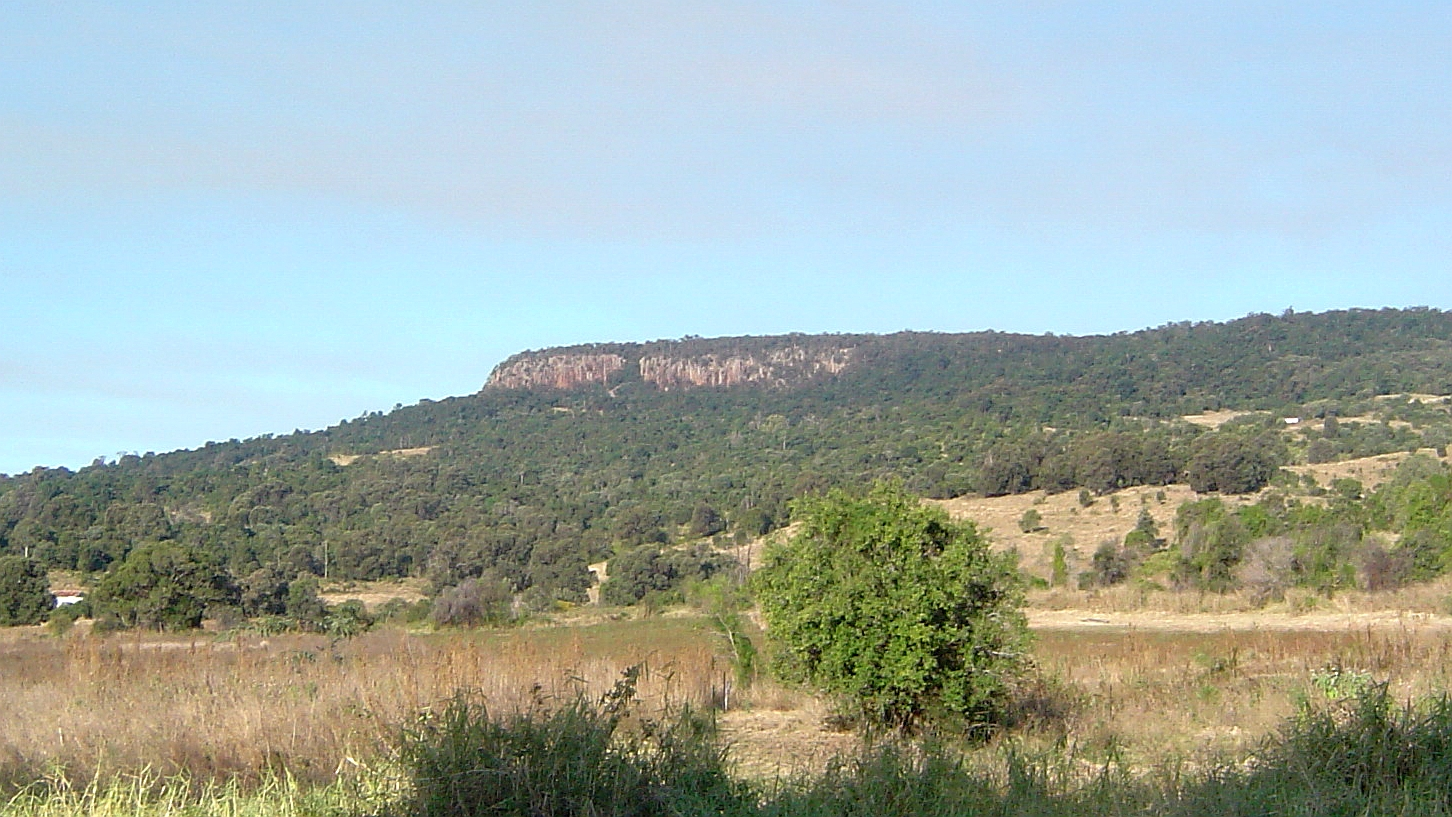
View from Lake Moogerah Road, 2011

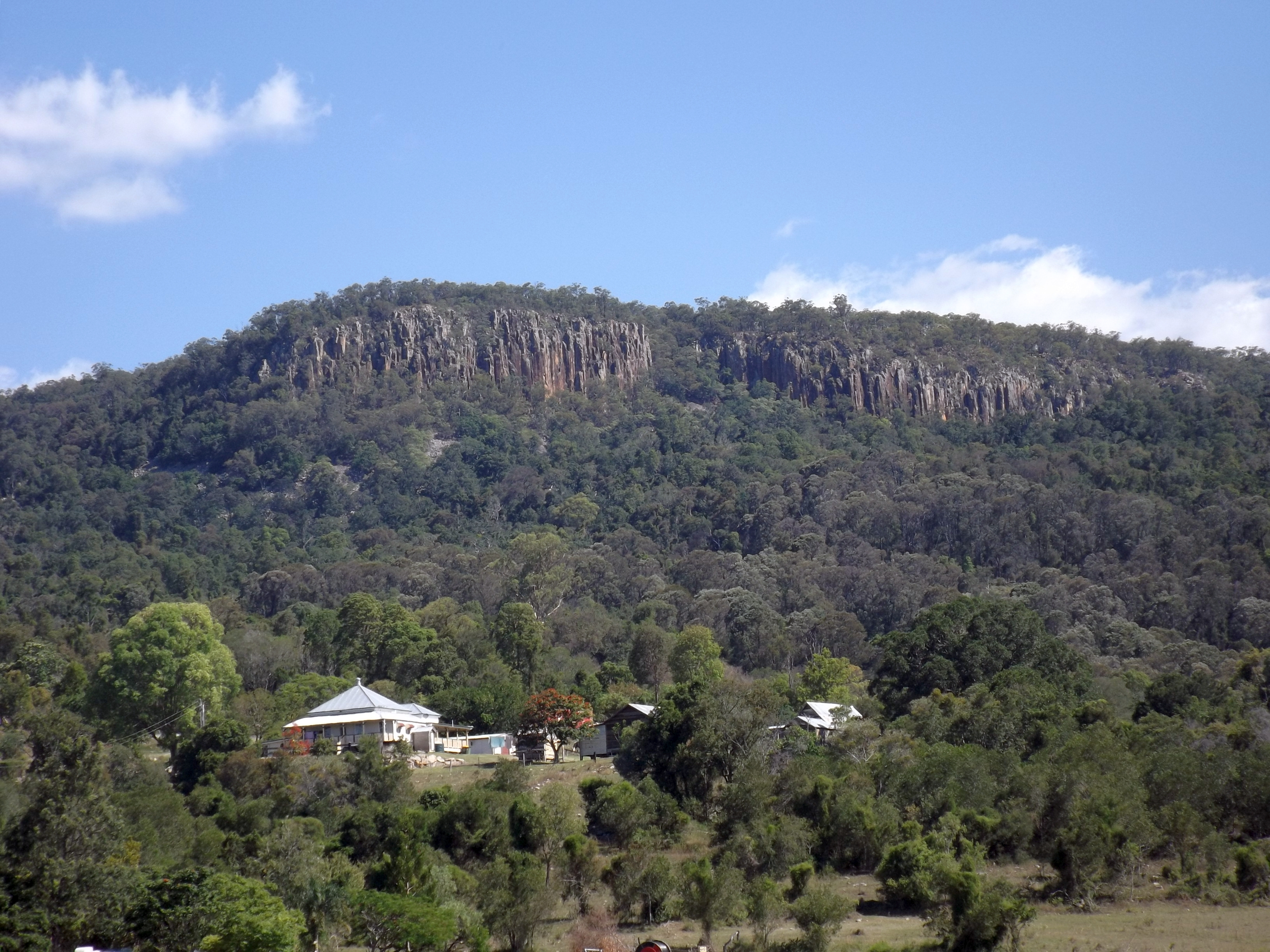
View from Templin, 2016

Frog Buttress is a cliff on the north-west side of Mount French, in the Moogerah Peaks National Park near the town of Boonah in Queensland, Australia. It became famous when local rock climbers Rick White and Chris Meadows discovered it in 1968. Since then, 400 routes have been established by climbers including Henry Barber, Kim Carrigan and Tobin Sorenson.

The buttress is small by world climbing standards: 400m wide, 50m high in the middle, and 20m at its ends. However, it is formed of rhyolite columns, with superb climbing up the many cracks, corners and aretes between them. Most of the cracks are smooth sided and parallel, necessitating the use of many spring-loaded camming devices and efficient crack climbing technique.

There are now over 400 documented routes with grades ranging from 4 to 32 on the Ewbank Scale. The style of climbing is staunchly traditional using natural protection, with very few sport routes. There are bolts on faces and arêtes and in most cases climbers need to bring their own brackets. Top-roping is difficult due to the fragile clifftop and is considered somewhat unethical at this largely 'purist' crag. Historically, some climbs were initialled at the bottom for easy route-finding, although this practice is now discouraged.

Climbing is best in winter, as during the summer months it quickly becomes too hot to spend much time on the rock, and midday climbing is not recommended. A good strategy is to get in a morning climb, and then head off to the Dugandan Pub, about 9 kilometres away in Boonah, for food and beer.

There are (showerless) camping facilities above the cliff for $4.85 per night, but one needs to book ahead.

== History ==
The area was first developed by Rick White and Chris Meadows in 1968. The first climb done at the cliff was Corner of Eden (21). The name "Frog Buttress" refers to some condom packets they found at the top - at the time "French Letters" was a common euphemism. Local climbers including White, Meadows, Ted Cais, Robert Staszewski, Ian Thomas, Ron Collett and Ian Cameron ascended many routes over the next few years, often with the use of aid. Odin (19) was the testpiece, and Black Light (22) was a great achievement.

When Henry Barber visited Australia in 1975, he arrived in Brisbane and missed his flight to Sydney. He spent his time making free ascents of many routes, and put up the crag classics Conquistador (21) and Child in Time (22). The locals were inspired by his free climbing talent, and repeated many of his routes in the next few years.

John Allen and Tobin Sorenson visited in the late 1970s, and made some typically bold ascents.

Climbers from Victoria put up many harder routes in the 1980s. Brown Corduroy Trowsers (28) remains the outstanding hard trad route.

== Routes ==
Easier routes for the newcomer include:

Name	Ascent	Rating	Notes
Witches Cauldron	17m	12	Nice easy lift-shaft.
Electric Mud	10m	13	A relaxing corner.
Shit Heap	10m	14	This is the route for jamming practice.
Theory	25m	14	A nice and varied longer route.
Electronic Flag	40m	14	A long pitch requiring varied technique.
Mechanical Prune	18m	15	An open chimney.

It is widely considered that the high quality routes lie in the 19 to 23 grade range. Most beginners will find 'easy' routes very hard for the grade, but at the low 20s up, most routes are quite reasonable for the grade.
