= Cluny (disambiguation) =

Cluny is a commune in the Saône-et-Loire department in the region of Bourgogne in eastern France.

Cluny may also refer to:

- Abbey of Cluny, a Benedictine monastery in Cluny, department of Saône-et-Loire, France
- Cluny, Alberta, a hamlet in Canada
- Cluny, Mauritius, a village in the district of Grand Port, Mauritius
- Cluny, Fife, a small settlement 7 km (4 ½ miles) north-west of Kirkcaldy, Fife, Scotland.
- Cluny, Aberdeenshire, 15 km (9 miles) south-west of Inverurie, near Sauchen, Scotland
  - Cluny Castle, in the parish of Cluny, 3 km (2 miles) north-north-west of Sauchen, Aberdeenshire
- Cluny Harbour, Buckie, Moray, as well as the Cluny Square, the central square in Buckie, containing the Cluny Hotel
- William Douglas of Cluny (1430-1475), Scottish nobleman
- Loch Cluanie and its eponymous dam, Northwest Highlands, Scotland
- The MacPherson of Cluny, the chief of Clan MacPherson
- The Cluny, a live music venue and pub in Newcastle upon Tyne, England
- The Cluny Museum in Paris
- Cluny the Scourge, an anthropomorphic rat and antagonist in the novel Redwall
- Cluny–La Sorbonne station, a metro station in the 5th arrondissement of Paris, named for the Hôtel de Cluny

== See also ==
- The Cluny (disambiguation)
- Henry Cluney (born 1957), American guitarist with Stiff Little Fingers
- Johanna Drew Cluney (1895–1978) American Hawaiian featherworker, collector
- Clooney (disambiguation)
