= The Cluny (disambiguation) =

Cluny or The Cluny may refer to:

- The Cluny, a live music venue and pub in Newcastle upon Tyne, England
- Cluny, a commune in the Saône-et-Loire department in the region of Bourgogne in eastern France
- Cluny Abbey, a Benedictine monastery in Cluny, department of Saône-et-Loire, France
- Musée de Cluny, a museum of medieval art in Paris, France
