= Moogerah Dam =

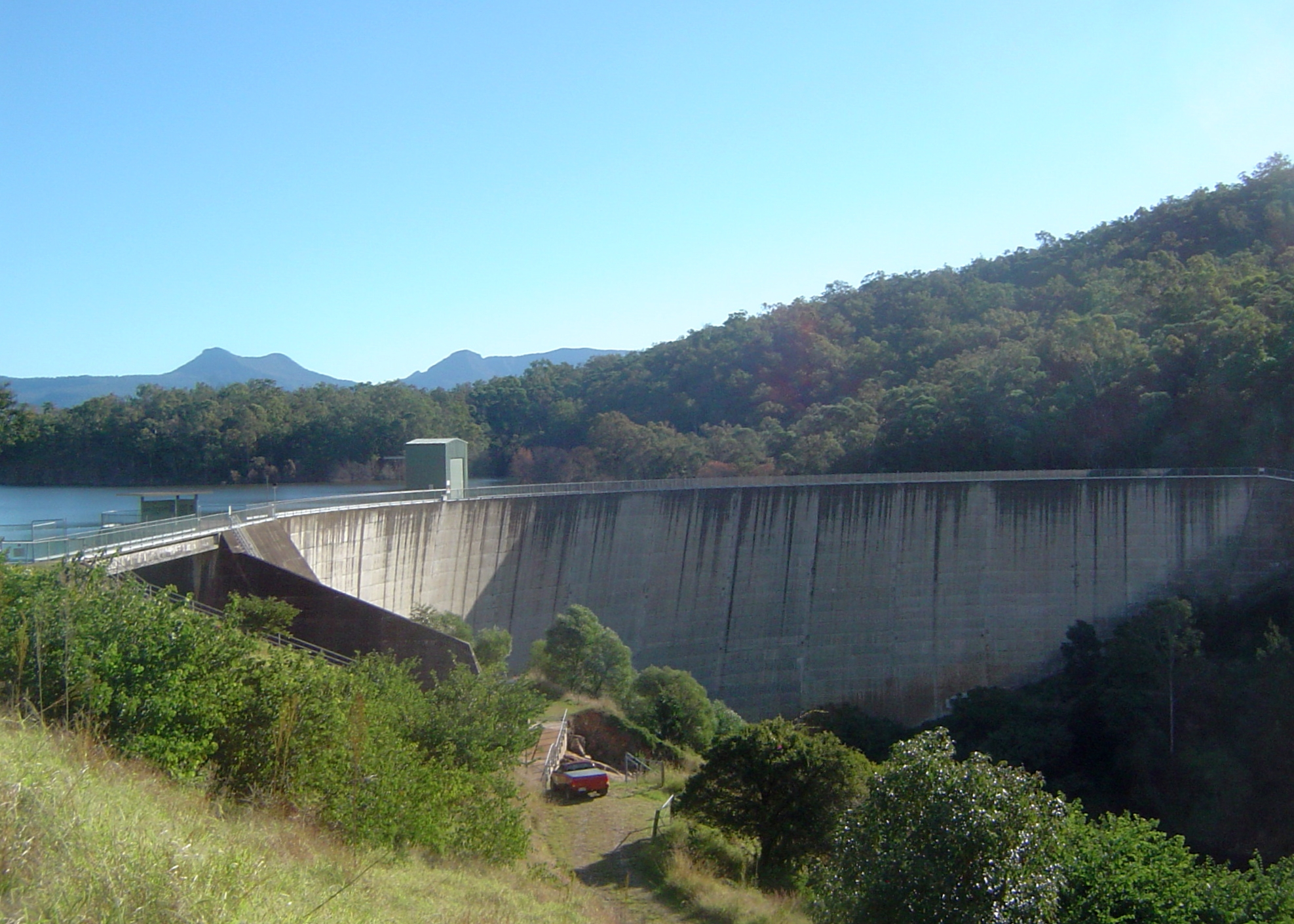
- The Moogerah Dam wall, in 2011

- Location of the Moogerah Dam in Queensland
- Country: Australia
- Location: South East Queensland
- Coordinates: 28°1′48″S 152°32′56″E
- Purpose: Irrigation; Potable water supply
- Status: Operational
- Construction began: 1959
- Opening date: 1961
- Operator: SEQ Water

Dam and spillways
- Type of dam: Arch dam
- Impounds: Reynolds Creek
- Height: 38 m (125 ft)
- Length: 219 m (719 ft)
- Dam volume: 23×10^{3} m^{3} (810×10^{3} cu ft)
- Spillway type: Uncontrolled
- Spillway capacity: 740 m^{3}/s (26,000 cu ft/s)

Reservoir
- Creates: Lake Moogerah
- Total capacity: 83,700 ML (1.84×10^{10} imp gal; 2.21×10^{10} US gal)
- Catchment area: 228 km^{2} (88 sq mi)
- Surface area: 827 ha (2,040 acres)
- Normal elevation: 154.91 m (508.2 ft) AHD
- Website www.seqwater.com.au

The Moogerah Dam is a mass concrete double curvature arch dam with an un-gated spillway across Reynolds Creek in South East Queensland, Australia, now within the locality of Moogerah in the Scenic Rim Region. The main purposes of the dam are for irrigation in the Reynolds Creek district and for supply of potable water to Warrill Creek and farmers in the Warrill Valley. The impounded reservoir is called Lake Moogerah.

The name Moogerah is derived from an Aboriginal word meaning thunder.

== Location and features ==
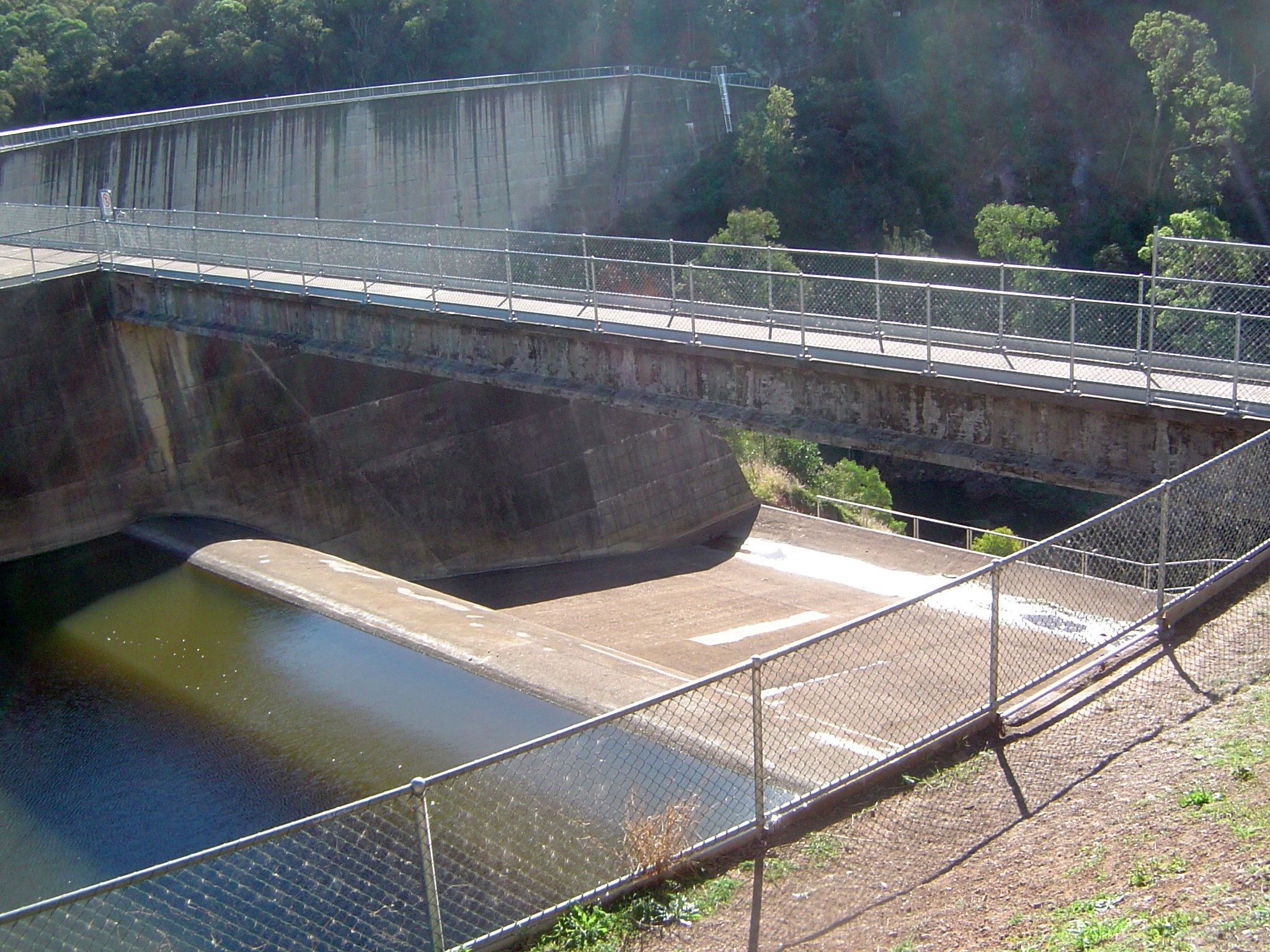
Spillway

The dam is located above the Fassifern Valley, approximately 60 kilometres (37 mi) southwest of Ipswich. Aratula is the nearest town, approximately 11 kilometres (6.8 mi) from the dam and the nearest major centre is Boonah. The primary inflow of the reservoir is the Reynolds Creek, a tributary of the Bremer River.

Construction on the dam began in 1959, although land for the project was resumed as early as 1916. Completed in 1961 as the central catchment of the Warrill Valley Water Supply Scheme, the concrete dam structure is 38 metres (125 ft) high and 219 metres (719 ft) long and allows access to Mount Edwards in Moogerah Peaks National Park. The 315-thousand-cubic-metre (11.1×10^{6} cu ft) dam wall holds back the 83,765-megalitre (1.8426×10^{10} imp gal; 2.2128×10^{10} US gal) reservoir when at full capacity. From a catchment area of 228 square kilometres (88 sq mi) that includes much of the north–eastern slopes of the Main Range, the dam creates Lake Moogerah, with a surface area of 827 hectares (2,040 acres). The uncontrolled spillway has a discharge capacity of 740 cubic metres per second (26,000 cu ft/s). Initially managed by SunWater, management of the dam was transferred to Seqwater in July 2008 as part of a water security project in the South East Queensland region, known as the South East Queensland Water Grid.

The dam supplies drinking water to the towns of Boonah and Ipswich, although the main user is the Swanbank Power Station. It also supplies irrigation water to small crop farms in the Fassifern Valley. SunWater is undertaking a dam spillway capacity upgrade program to ensure the continued safety of the dam. During the 1995 drought dam levels declined to a low of 1% total capacity. The dam reached 100% capacity due to rainfall associated with the 2010–2011 Queensland floods, with water flowing over the spillway for the first time since 1991 on 6 December 2010.

== Recreation ==
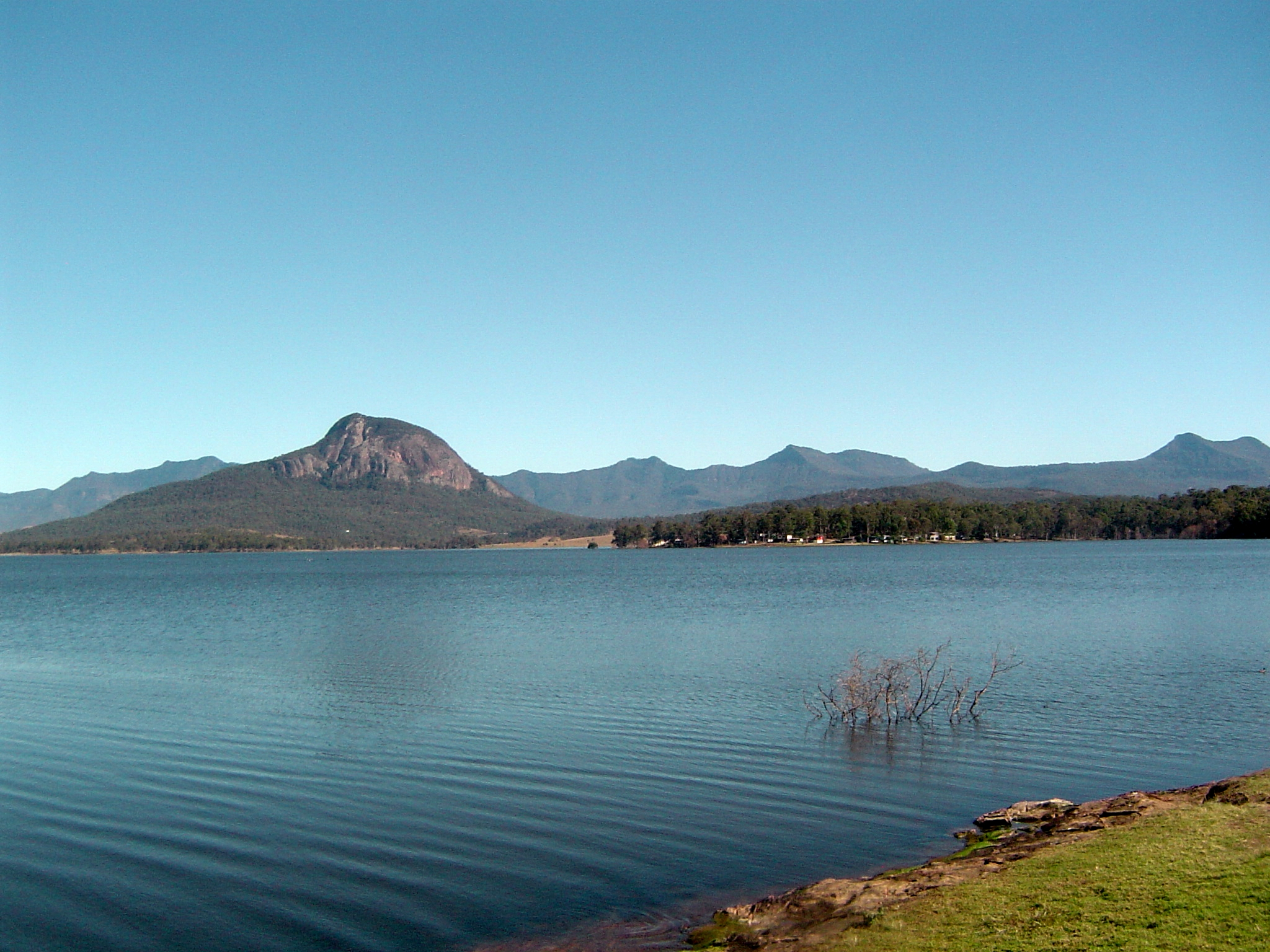
Lake Moogerah at 99.5% capacity

Amenities adjacent to the dam and reservoir include such places as Moogerah Lakeside Bush Retreat which was previously a church campground but is now a locally owned and operated lakeside camping destination offering standard camping options as well as bunkhouses sleeping up to 12 people each, and self-contained cottage accommodation. Activities available at the retreat include fishing, boat hire, kayak hire, as well as a variety of bushwalks.

In addition to this, Camp Moogerah is on the eastern shore of the lake, offering cabin accommodation and outdoor activity camps for schools, churches, youth groups, sports clubs etc. On the western shore are School Camps Queensland and Camp Laurence which offer group accommodation camps with educational and adventure activities for school students, family and church groups. On the southern shore is the privately owned and used, Brisbane Grammar School Pepperina Hill Campsite, which is primarily used for grade 8–10 camps throughout the year, and where the school owns a boatshed for kayaking on the lake.

Barbecues and picnic areas at Haig Park. This side also provides access to the dam wall. Across the wall is Mount Edwards which has several walking trail and hiking paths. The road uphill behind the old kiosk (now a house) leads to a lookout and downhill to a further picnic area and playground at the bottom of the wall on the banks of Reynolds Creek.

School Camps Queensland operates camping and family cabins that sleep up to 12 people in each cabin during school holidays and weekends. Scenic Rim Regional Council operate a caravan park at the end of Muller Park road. It offers a variety of accommodation (powered, unpowered tent and caravan sites, overnight cabin and house and permanent cabins). Other site facilities include electric and wood barbecues, two boat ramps, kiosk (bread, milk, ice, firewood and sundries), kayak hire and children's playground. Lake Moogerah Caravan Park is located near many of the area's attractions and activities, including wineries, national parks and Lake Moogerah itself.

In September 2014 a designated swimming area at A G Muller Park was opened to the public. Lake Moogerah is extremely popular for waterskiing and plays host to jetski and waterskiing events throughout the year.

A stocked impoundment permit is required to fish in the dam. Permits are available from the manager at Lake Moogerah Caravan Park.

== Events ==
The Moogerah Passion Play is an open-air theatre production on the shores of Lake Moogerah. It is held every Easter, with a cast of up to 80.

== See also ==
- List of dams in Queensland
