= Mount Clunie National Park =

National park in New South Wales, Australia

- IUCN category II (national park)
- Location within New South Wales
- Location: New South Wales
- Nearest city: Kyogle
- Coordinates: 28°19′27″S 152°31′12″E
- Area: 14.26 km^{2} (5.51 sq mi)
- Established: 1 January 1999
- Governing body: NSW National Parks & Wildlife Service
- Website: Official website

The Mount Clunie National Park is a protected national park in the Northern Rivers region of New South Wales, Australia. The 1,426-hectare (3,520-acre) park is situated approximately 631 kilometres (392 mi) north of Sydney and can be located via Kyogle via the Bruxner Highway and the Summerland Way. The park's north-eastern limits define the state border between New South Wales and Queensland. The average elevation of the terrain is 634 metres above sea level.

The park is part of the Focal Peak Group World Heritage Site Gondwana Rainforests of Australia inscribed in 1986 and added to the Australian National Heritage List in 2007.

The park is also part of the Scenic Rim Important Bird Area, identified as such by BirdLife International because of its importance in the conservation of several species of threatened birds.

== See also ==
- Protected areas of New South Wales
