= Clooney (surname) =

Clooney is a surname. Notable people with the surname include:

- Amal Clooney (born 1978), Lebanese-British lawyer and wife of George
- Francis Xavier Clooney (born 1950), American academic and Roman Catholic priest
- George Clooney (born 1961), American actor
- Nick Clooney (born 1934), American TV host and journalist, father of George
- Rosemary Clooney (1928–2002), American singer and actress, aunt of George
