= Teviot Range =

Mountain range in Queensland, Australia

Teviot Range is a mountain range in the Scenic Rim Region, Queensland, Australia.

== Geography ==
The principal peaks in the Teviot Range are:

- Mount Moon (Indigenous name: Kibbobum): (28.1144°S 152.5503°E)
- Mount Alford (Indigenous name: Teenaryvilla): (28.0817°S 152.5383°E)
