= Rick White (climber) =

Australian rock climber and mountaineer

Rick White (1946 – 26 November 2004) was an Australian rock climber, best known for discovering and developing rock climbing on the north cliffs of Mt French, the so-called Frog Buttress, near Boonah in Queensland, Australia. This roughly 50m high cliff, composed of rhyolite columns, is a bastion of 'trad' crack climbing. White's natural ability shone, with many first ascents recorded as 'Second unable to follow'.

As quality rock climbing equipment was extremely difficult to obtain in Australia, Rick White founded Rick's Mountain Shop to import gear from the states and sell to the small local climbing community. This later became Mountain Designs. which had its head office, a factory manufacturing soft goods, and a retail shop in Fortitude Valley. This building now houses Rocksports Indoor Climbing.

White was the first person to solo Ball's Pyramid, and did so with a time of 1 hour and 45 minutes.

Rick White's mountaineering ascents included:

- 1973 - First Australian ascent of El Capitan, Yosemite, USA.
- 1974/5 - North face of Fitzroy, Patagonia with Rob Staszewski.
- 1979 - Andes, Patagonia with Greg Child, Paul Edwards, Ken Joyce.
- 1982 - Shivling, India with Greg Child, George Bettemburg (FR), Doug Scott (UK).
- 1985 - Mustagh Ata with Steve McDowell.

In his later years, White developed a muscle wasting disease, inclusion body myositis, which gradually prevented him from climbing. With a lasting passion for the sport, he remained active in the climbing scene mentoring a number of young competitive climbers including Cass Crane, Peter Crane, Thomas Farrell and Libby Hall.

He died in Winchester Hospital in the United Kingdom while seeking natural treatment for an aggressive brain tumor. His ashes were scattered from the top of the first route he did at Frog Buttress, 'Corner of Eden'.
