= Clunie (surname) =

Clunie is a surname. Notable people with the surname include:

- David Clunie (1948–2025), Scottish footballer
- James Clunie (1889–1974), British politician
- Jim Clunie (1933–2003), Scottish footballer
- Michelle Clunie (born 1969), American actress
- Robert Clunie (1895–1984), Scottish-American artist
- Thomas J. Clunie (1852–1903), American politician
