= Scenic Rim =

Group of mountain ranges in Australia

Coordinates: 28°07′22″S 153°11′22″E

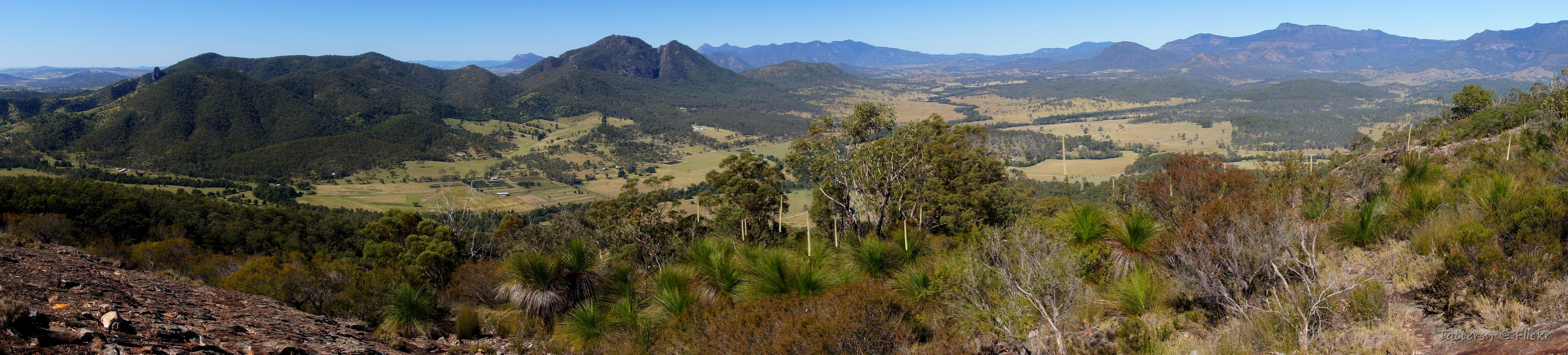
Moogerah Peaks National Park

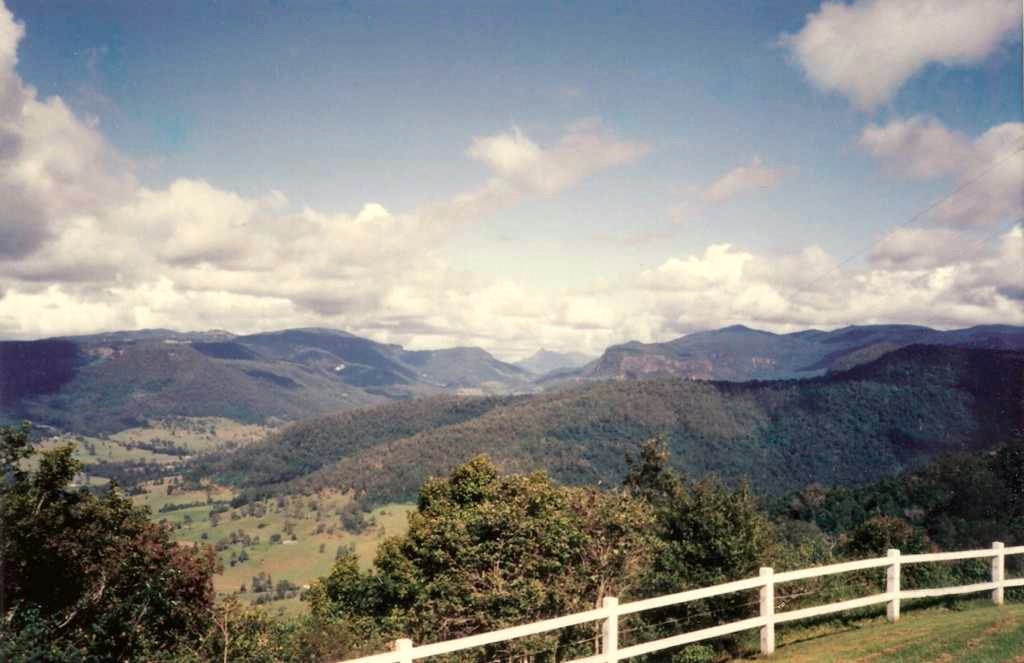
Numinbah Valley and surrounding plateaus form part of the eastern rim.

The Scenic Rim is a group of forested mountain ranges of the Great Dividing Range, located south of Brisbane agglomeration, straddling the border between south-eastern Queensland and north-eastern New South Wales, Australia. In 2021, the Scenic Rim was named as a Lonely Planet top destination for 2022.

== History ==
Yugarabul (also known as Ugarapul and Yuggerabul) and Yugembah (also known as Yugumbir, Jugambel, Jugambeir, Jugumbir, Jukam, Jukamba) are Australian Aboriginal languages of the Scenic Rim, South-East Queensland.The Yugarabul language region includes the landscape within the local government boundaries of Brisbane City Council, Ipswich City Council and the Scenic Rim Regional Council. The Yugembah language areas include Gold Coast, Logan, Scenic Rim, Tweed River Valley, Albert River, Beaudesert, Beenleigh, Coolangatta, Coomera, Logan River, Pimpama and Tamborine, within the local government boundaries of the City of Gold Coast, City of Logan, Scenic Rim Regional Council and the Tweed River Valley.

== Description ==
The Scenic Rim has been described as one of Queensland's great natural treasure troves. The landscape is visually stunning. The topography is varied and rainfall fairly high, especially in the east. In the west dryer conditions lead to distinct vegetation types, such as dry eucalyptus forest, dominating. The Scenic Rim lies in a zone where tropical, temperate and western species overlap in a biodiversity hot spot. Biologists refer to this region as the Macleay-McPherson Overlap.

The mountainous landscape forms a quarter circle ridge positioned roughly from south of Toowoomba around to Springbrook. Tamborine Mountain, Lever's Plateau and the Lamington Plateau are part of the rim formation. The scenic rim is considered part of the Gold Coast hinterland. Parts of the rim are well developed, crossed by highways with facilities for tourists like Cunninghams Gap, others are privately owned agricultural properties and rural villages such as Beechmont and Tamborine Mountain. Much of the rest is protected in national parks and nature reserves.

== Ranges and Valleys ==
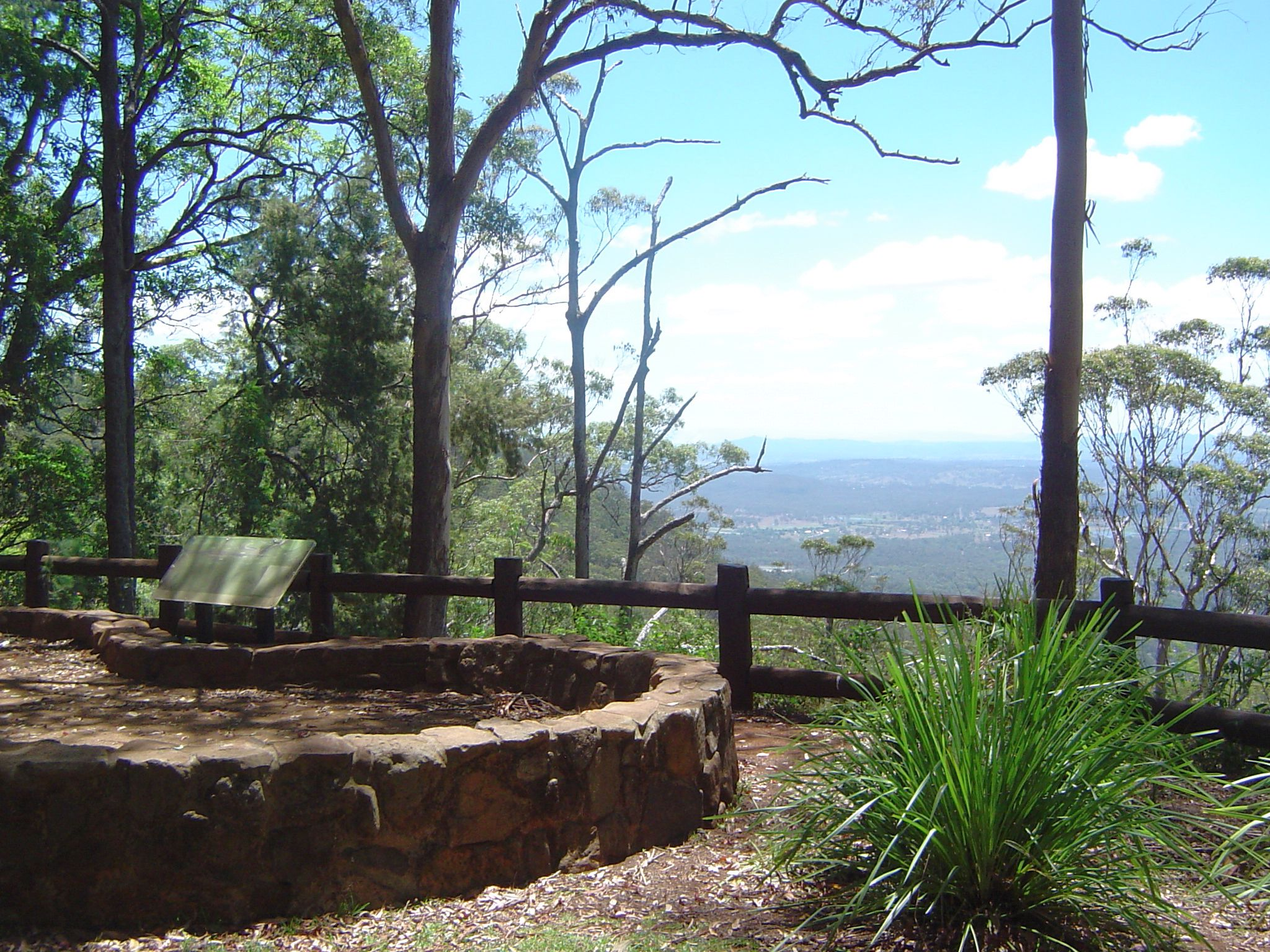
View north from Tamborine Mountain

The ranges include the Little Liverpool Range, Main Range, Mistake Mountains, McPherson Range, Teviot Range and the Tweed Range. Valleys of the Scenic Rim include Laidley Creek, Christmas Creek, Lockyer Valley, Fassifern Valley, Numinbah Valley, the Albert River, Logan River, Coomera River and the Bremer River.

== Environment ==
The geology and landscape of the Scenic Rim is largely volcanic in origin, deriving from the prehistoric Tweed Volcano, including the Mount Warning shield volcano, and the Focal Peak and Main Range volcanic rocks. Some areas of sedimentary origin include parts of Mount Barney and eastern Lamington national parks. The deeply weathered, mainly basaltic, soils support rainforest and vine thicket ecosystems, as well as rare eucalypt and grassland communities. The area has a subtropical climate with (at the lowest altitudes) average minimum winter temperatures of 6 °C (43 °F), average maximum summer temperatures of 29 °C (84 °F), and average annual rainfall of 1,555 mm (61.2 in).

== Protected areas ==
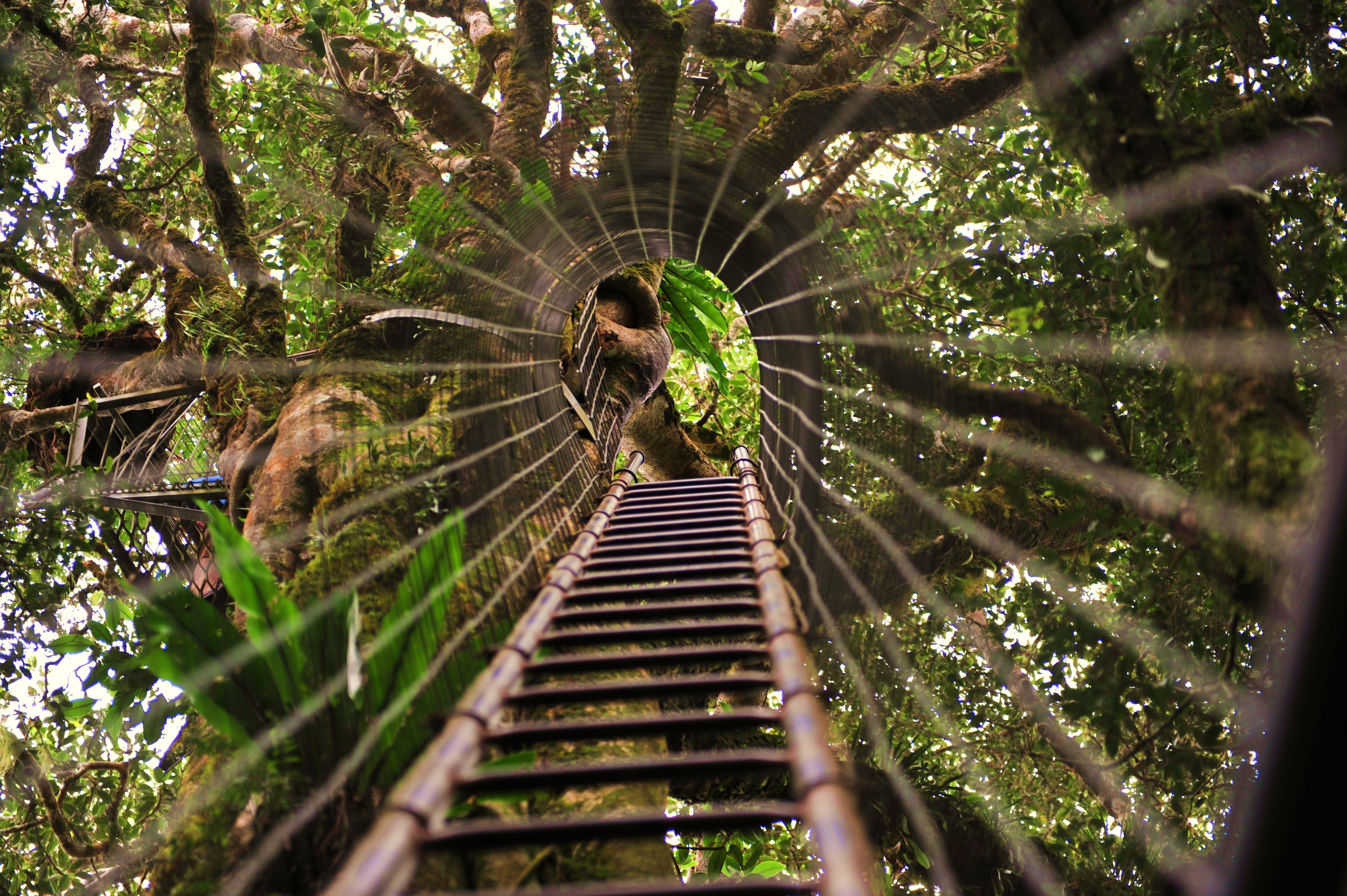
The treetops walk at Lamington National Park

Areas protected in national parks and other conservation reserves include the Border Ranges National Park, Glen Rock Regional Park, Koreelah National Park, Lamington National Park, Limpinwood Nature Reserve, Main Range National Park, Mebbin National Park, Moogerah Peaks National Park, Mount Barney National Park, Mount Chinghee National Park, Mount Clunie National Park, Mount Nothofagus National Park, Mount Warning National Park, Numinbah Nature Reserve and Springbrook National Park. Parts of the Scenic Rim, Gondwana Rainforests, are listed as a World Heritage Site, and some are designated Wilderness Areas.

== Important Bird Area ==
A 1,351 km^{2} (522 sq mi) area encompassing the Scenic Rim has been identified by BirdLife International as an Important Bird Area (IBA) because it supports populations of endangered eastern bristlebirds, black-breasted button-quails, rufous scrub-birds, Albert's lyrebirds, pale-yellow robins, paradise riflebirds, green catbirds, regent bowerbirds and Australian logrunners. There are also historical and recent sight records of the critically endangered Coxen's fig parrot. Migratory cuckoos can be seen and heard from Spring to Summer.

== Tourism ==
There are many recreational activities for day-trippers, rockclimbers, hikers and nature lovers on the ranges. The concept of the Scenic Rim was first described by Arthur Groom and Romeo Lahey in the 1920s. They were campaigning for the protection of the forests from Main Range to the Lamington Plateau. At about the same time the Binna Burra Lodge and O'Reilly's Guesthouse were established as the popularity of the area grew with tourists.

== See also ==
- List of mountains of Australia
- Tourism in Australia
