= Mount Moon =

Mountain in Queensland, Australia

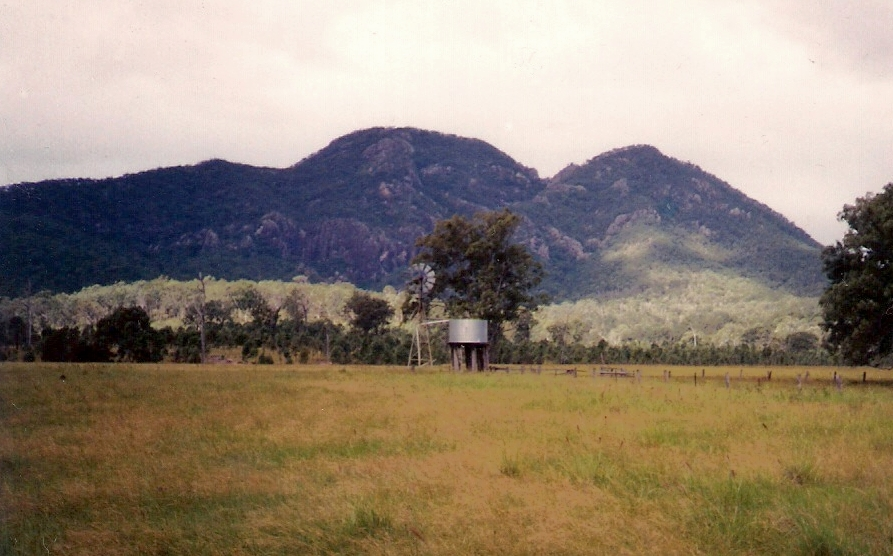
Mount Moon, 2010

Mount Moon is a lightly timbered, dome-shaped mountain in the Scenic Rim, Queensland, Australia (28.1144°S 152.5503°E). Its Indigenous name is Kibbobum. The mountain rises 784 metres (2,572 ft) above sea level and is part of the Teviot Range and is within the Moogerah Peaks National Park. It is within the locality of Croftby in the Scenic Rim Region local government area.

It lies approximately 100 km south west of Brisbane just outside the town of Boonah.

The mountain was established as a national park in 1953.

The peak is a rhyolite plug. The rise features a craggy landscape dominated by a prominent fracture that has been enlarged by erosion. Access to the mountain is via private property only, for which permission must be obtained.

== See also ==
- List of mountains in Australia
