= WISS =

WISS or Wiss may refer to:

== As an initialism ==
- Western International School of Shanghai
- WISS (AM), radio station (1100 AM) licensed to Berlin, Wisconsin, United States
  - WISS Trivia Contest, long-running contest run by WISS

== As a surname ==
- Alain Wiss (born 1990), Swiss footballer
- Benno Wiss (born 1962), Swiss cyclist
- Jarkko Wiss (born 1972), Finnish footballer and manager

== Other uses ==
- Wiss, brand of scissors and snips from Apex Tool Group
- Wiss, character from the recurring skit The Land of Gorch
- Wiss Brothers Store, heritage-listed shopping centre in Kalbar, Queensland, Australia
- Wiss House, heritage-listed detached house in Kalbar, Queensland, Australia
- Wiss Platte, mountain in the Rätikon range of the Alps
