= Fassifern Valley =

Place in Queensland, Australia

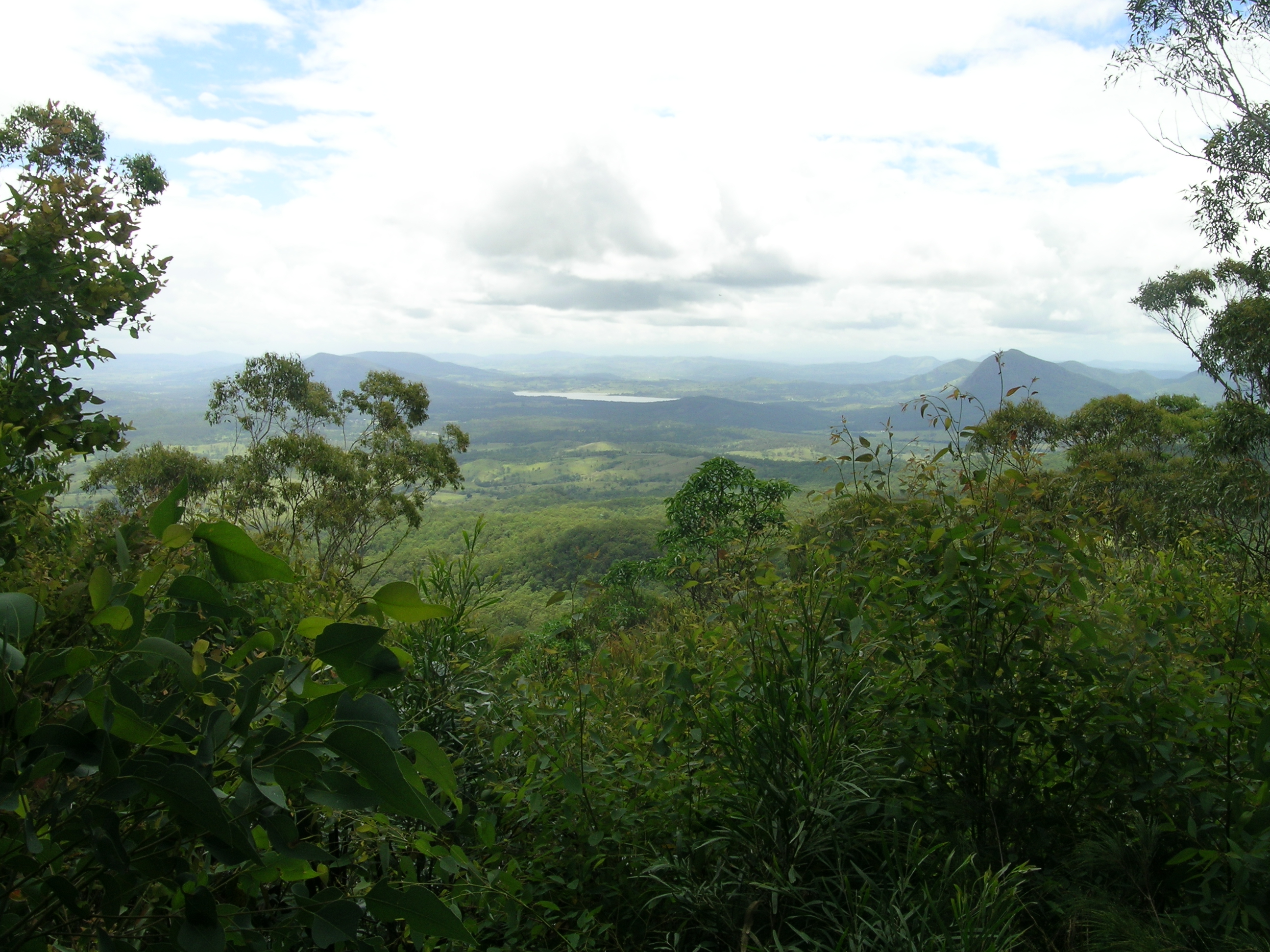
- Fassifern Valley and Lake Moogerah viewed from the Main Range National Park

Geography
- Location: Australia, Queensland, South East Queensland
- Coordinates: 27.8109°S 152.6651°E
- Interactive map of Fassifern Valley

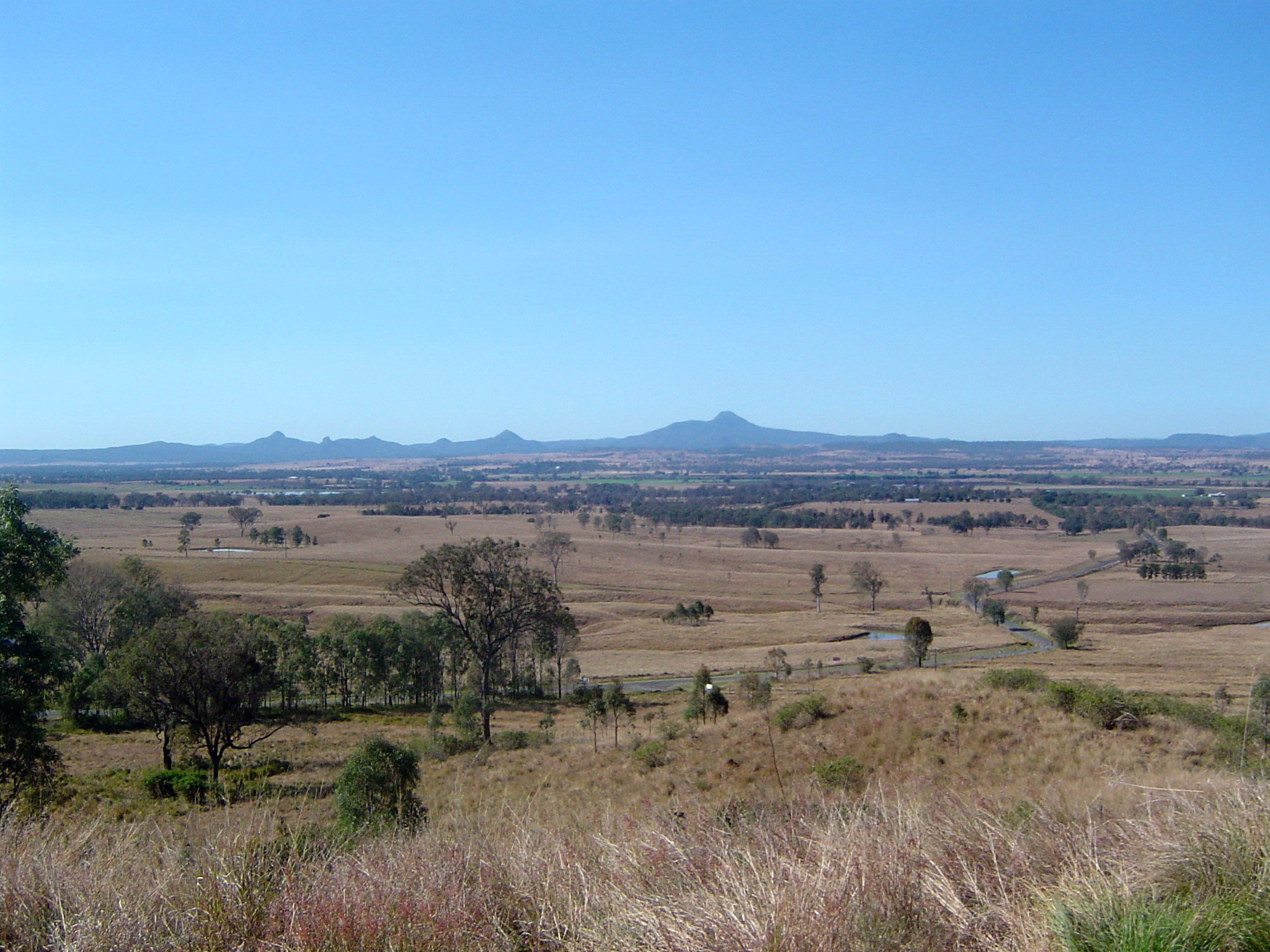
Fassifern Valley and Flinders Peak Group, 2011

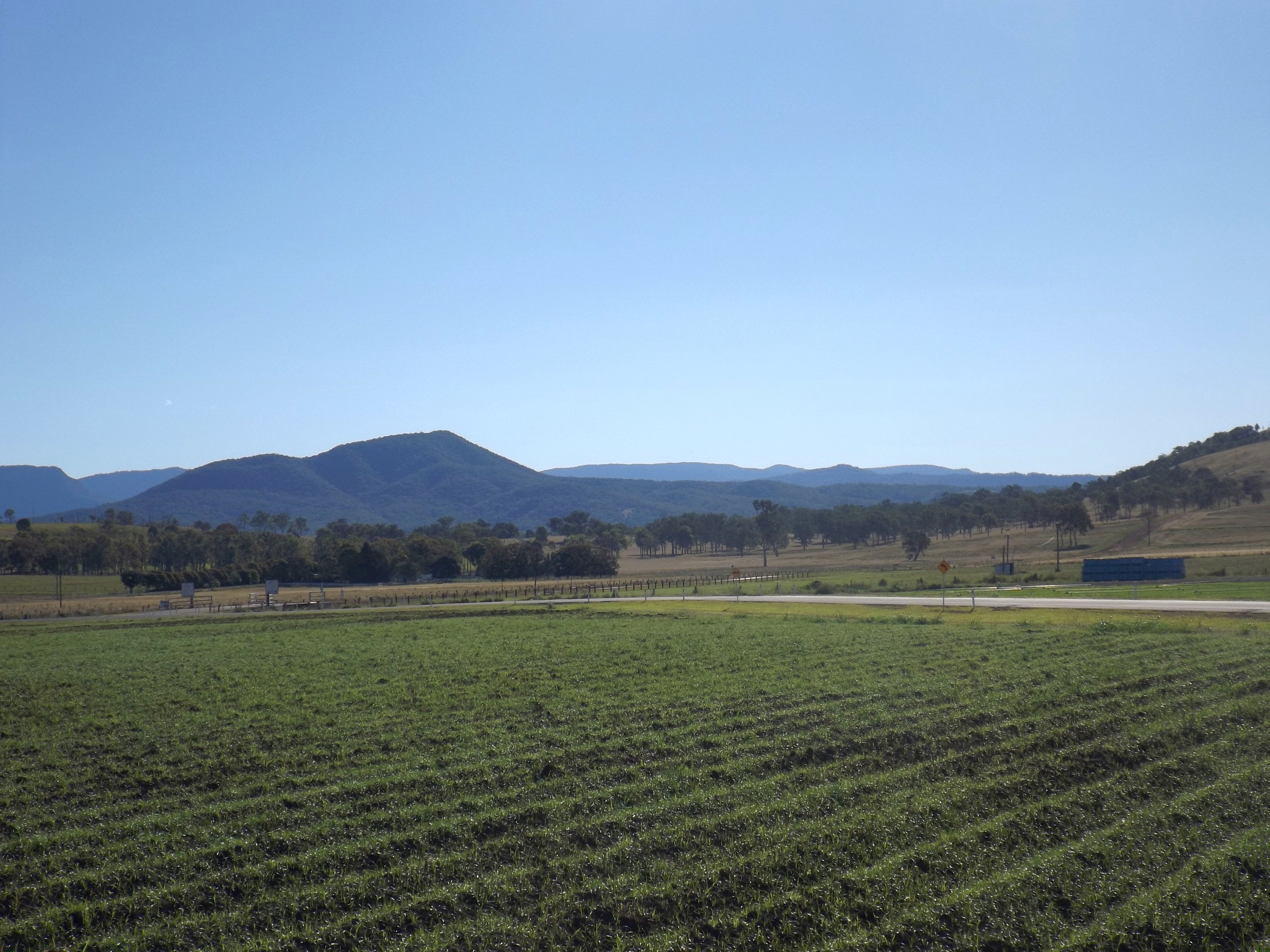
Crops at Frazerview, 2015

Fassifern Valley is a valley of the Scenic Rim in South East Queensland. Towns found in the valley include Harrisville, Kalbar, Roadvale, Warril View and Aratula. Fassifern Valley is known as a carrot-producing area, as well as for growing potatoes, onions, pumpkins and melons. It is one of four vegetable-producing regions in southern Queensland, the others being the Lockyer Valley, the eastern Darling Downs and the Granite Belt.

The Cunningham Highway passes through the town of Aratula and along ridges in the upper valley towards Cunninghams Gap, Mount Mitchell and parts of the Main Range National Park. The Moogerah Peaks are a series of mountain peaks in the southeast of the catchment.

To the east lies the valleys of the Logan River. Further to the west is the dry catchment of Laidley Creek and Lockyer Creek in the Lockyer Valley while Amberley is located just to the north of the valley.

== History ==
Jagara (also known as Jagera, Yagara, Yugarabul, Yuggera and Yuggerabul) is one of the Aboriginal languages of South-East Queensland. There is some uncertainty over the status of Jagara as a language, dialect or perhaps a group or clan within the local government boundaries of Ipswich City Council, Lockyer Regional Council and the Somerset Regional Council.

Captain Patrick Logan was the first European to explore the valley in 1827, during which he climbed Mount French. The valley was first settled by pastoralists during the 1840s. The first settlers in the area where John Cameron and his brother-in-law Robert Coulson. The pair had arrived on the Darling Downs only to find all the best land already taken up. They eventually established themselves in the Fassifern Valley where number of other pastoral runs were established in the following decades, nearly all with familial connections to John Cameron. Cameron named the valley Fassefern which was a Scottish name. Many of the sheep and cattle stations names from the 19th century became the names of villages and towns in the valley, such as Moogerah, Bromelton and Dugandan which was later to become known as Boonah.

In September 1887, the Dugandan railway line was opened connecting Dugandan to the main line in the north. Timber-cutting served at least five sawmills in the area.

The Mount Edwards railway line, a branch line of the Dugandan railway, serviced a number of towns in the valley between 1922 and 1960.

== Agriculture ==
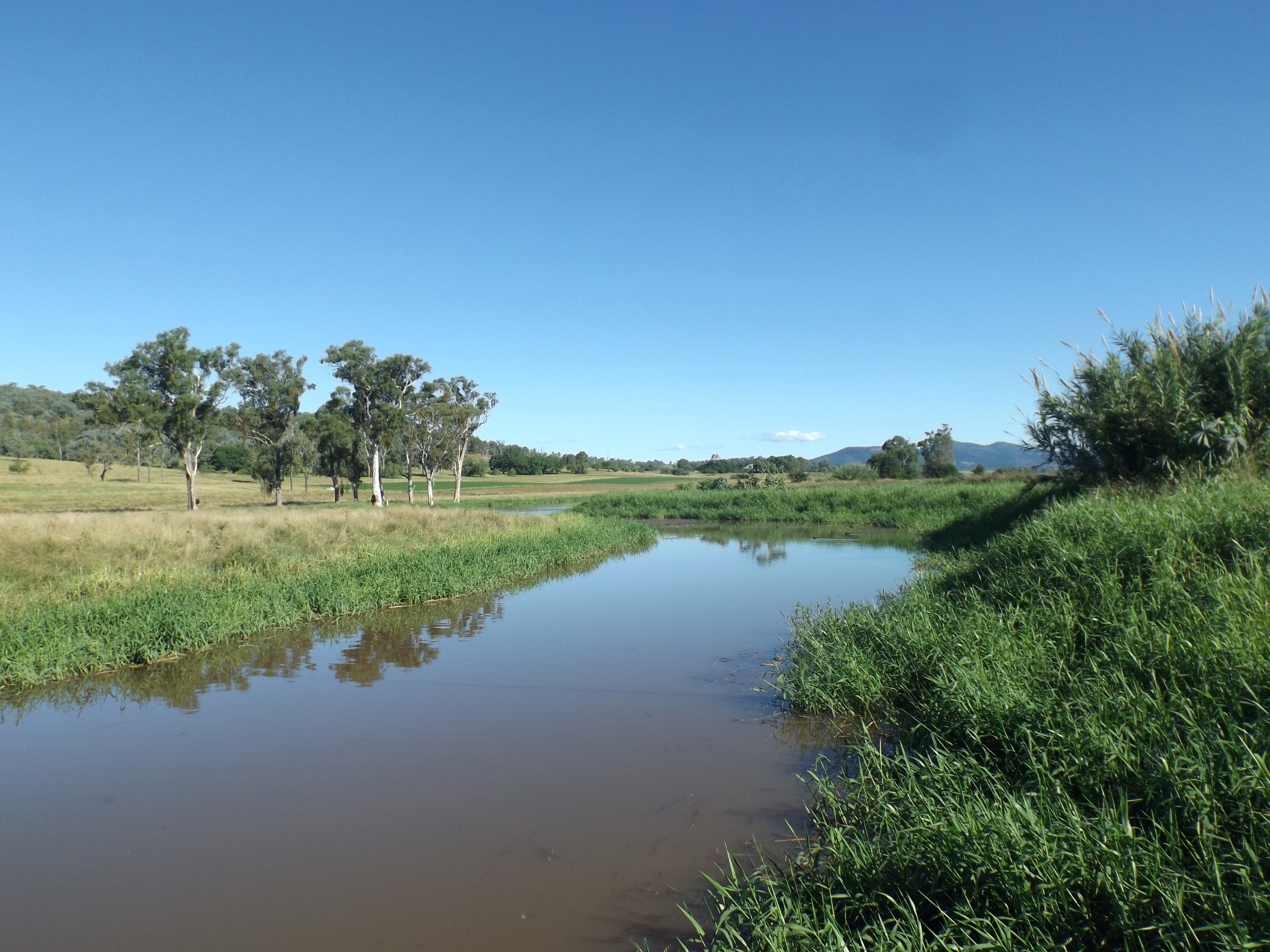
Kents Lagoon, 2015

Warril Creek provides a reliable water source for irrigated crop vegetables. A weir has been constructed at Kents Lagoon. A cattle tick clearing facility is located in Silverdale. In the aftermath of Cyclone Oswald severe flooding in the valley removed top soil from lands which may take a decade to recover from.

== Moogerah Dam ==
Lake Moogerah was built on Reynolds Creek which runs into Warril Creek a tributary of the Bremer River which drains the slopes to the west of Fassifern Valley. Irrigation allowed local farmers to diversify crops after dairy farming declined in the 1960s.

== See also ==
- List of valleys of Australia
- Numinbah Valley
- Samford Valley
