= Fassifern Homestead =

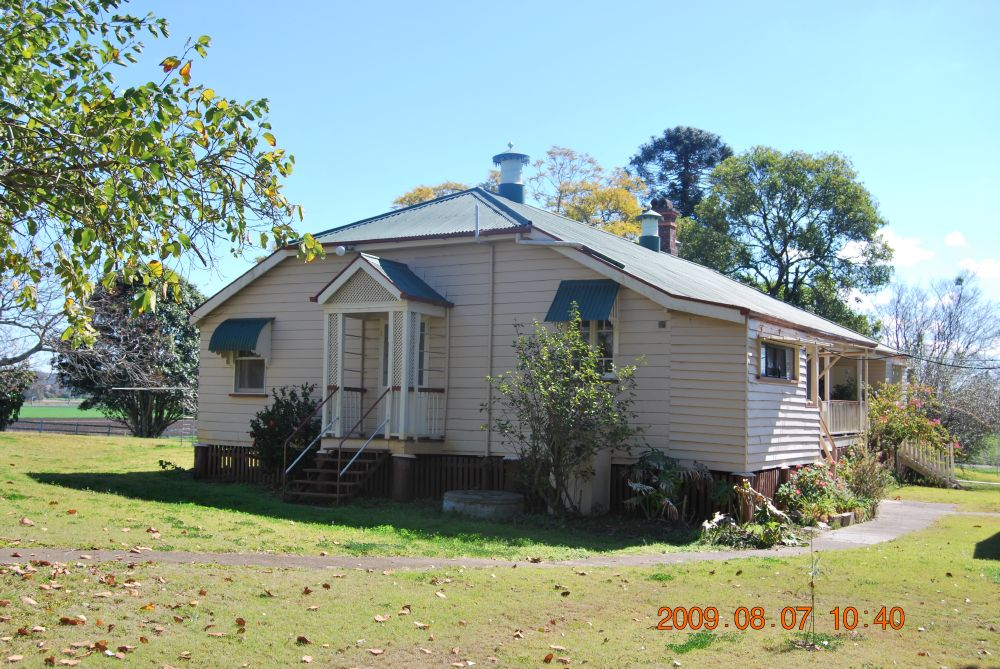
- Fassifern Homestead, 2009

- Location within Queensland Location within Australia
- 27.9596°S 152.5967°E
- Location: 1008B Boonah-Fassifern Road, Kalbar, Scenic Rim Region, Queensland, Australia

History
- Design period: 1940s - 1960s (post-World War II)
- Built: circa 1880

Queensland Heritage Register
- Official name: Fassifern Homestead
- Type: state heritage (built)
- Designated: 13 November 2008
- Reference no.: 602675
- Significant period: 1841 onwards
- Significant components: residential accommodation - main house, garden/grounds, trees/plantings, burial/grave

Fassifern Homestead is a heritage-listed homestead at 1008B Boonah-Fassifern Road, Kalbar, Scenic Rim Region, Queensland, Australia. It was built circa 1880. It was added to the Queensland Heritage Register on 13 November 2008.

== History ==
Fassifern Homestead is a single-storeyed timber residence erected c. 1880 to replace an earlier homestead on the same site. The Fassifern run, first taken up by John Cameron in 1841–1842, was one of the earliest licensed runs in the Moreton pastoral district, which was proclaimed on 10 May 1842. In 1857 Fassifern became part of the Wienholt family's complex and ultimately extensive Queensland pastoral empire and in 1869 was amalgamated with the adjacent runs of Moogerah and Tarome as the consolidated Fassifern run. Although from the 1870s used principally to fatten cattle from the Wiehnolt family's western Queensland properties, Fassifern was renowned also for its Clydesdale horse stud.

The Fassifern district is located in south-east Queensland, south of Flinders Peak, between the Great Dividing Range and the Teviot Range. In late 1841/early 1842 John Cameron occupied about 50,000 acres (20,000 ha) here centred on the junction of Warrill and Reynolds creeks and which he named Fassifern. In 1844 his brother-in-law Robert Coulson took up Kingbah (later Moogerah) - about 46,800 acres (18,900 ha) on the Reynolds Creek watershed, to the south of Fassifern; and in 1845 another brother-in-law, William Turner Beverley, took up an adjacent run to the west, which he called Cunningham's Gap (later Tarome) - about 41,500 acres (16,800 ha) on the Warrill Creek watershed. On each run a head station and a number of subsidiary out-stations were established. By May 1848 John Cameron had transferred the lease of Fassifern to William Kent.

In the mid-nineteenth century four young Wienholt brothers, sons of a wealthy London merchant, arrived in Australia: Arnold c. 1847, Edward and Arthur in 1853, and Daniel c. 1854. In 1849, backed by family money, Arnold Wienholt Sr purchased the lease to Strathmillar run (which he renamed Maryvale) on the Darling Downs. In 1852 he acquired the neighbouring run, Gladfield, which he incorporated into Maryvale. These runs were situated on the southern Downs on the western side of the Main Range. In 1853 Edward and Arthur Wienholt acquired Moogerah Station south-west of Fassifern, on the eastern side of the Dividing Range from Arnold's Maryvale run. The two Wienholt runs were linked via the new road over Spicer's Peak that the Downs squatters had constructed following Henry Alphen's "discovery" of a gap in the Main Range in 1847. In the early 1850s this was the preferred route between Ipswich and Warwick for teamsters.

In 1857 Edward and Arthur Wienholt acquired the Fassifern lease from William Kent, establishing a connection between Fassifern and the Wienholt family and their substantial Queensland pastoral empire, which was sustained for over half a century.

In 1859 Edward relinquished his interest in Fassifern and entered into partnership with William Kent in Rosalie Plains run on the Darling Downs. About this time, or possibly as early as 1858, Kent and Edward Wienholt also leased Jondaryan station from Robert Tooth, and in February 1863 purchased both the leasehold and the freehold. Jondaryan became the showpiece of the Kent and Weinholt/Wienholt family pastoral acquisitions. By 1876, 48 Queensland pastoral runs were leased by Edward Wienholt, Wienholt Brothers, J W E A & A Wienholt, or Kent and Wienholt. By 1877, Edward Wienholt and the trustees of William Kent were the largest owners of freehold land in Queensland and Jondaryan was the largest freehold run. Edward Wienholt further took advantage of the Exchanged Land Act 1879 whereby pastoralists could exchange agricultural land taken up as pre-emptive right for twice the amount of pastoral country.

17,700 acres (7,200 ha) were resumed from the Fassifern pastoral run and offered for selection on 19 April 1877.

Edward Wienholt, who served as Member of the Queensland Legislative Assembly for the Western Downs 1870–1873 and for the Darling Downs 1873–1875, is generally recognised as the driving force in the creation of the family's pastoral empire. By 1888 he and his partners held 289,966 acres (117,345 ha) in the Moreton and Darling Downs districts alone, and in 1889 The Wienholt Estates Company of Australia Ltd was formed to manage the Wienholt family's Queensland acquisitions. Their land dealings were complex, extensive, and largely managed from outside Australia. Arnold Wienholt retired to Switzerland in the late 1870s. Arthur Wienholt returned to England with his family in the 1870s, as did Edward Wienholt with his family in 1880. However, Edward continued to make regular trips to Australia to oversee the family's property interests.

In 1860 William Kent and Edward Wienholt re-purchased Fassifern Station from Arthur Wienholt but Arthur soon entered into partnership with John Hardie as lessees of Fassifern, Moogerah and Tarome runs. In November 1861 they acquired a pre-emptive purchase of 53 acres (21 ha) around the Fassifern head station on Reynolds Creek. Hardie was the senior partner, and in the early 1860s appears to have been resident at Fassifern, where he accrued substantial debt. In 1864 Hardie and Wienholt were declared insolvent, with the liquidation of their assets resulting in Fassifern Station (including about 1,300 acres (530 ha) of freehold) being acquired by their mortgagees, the Bank of Australasia. In January 1865 title to the pre-empted Fassifern head station passed to the Bank.

In June 1868 the Bank applied for the runs of Fassifern, Moogerah and Tarome to be consolidated under the provisions of The Crown Lands Alienation Act of 1868, the consolidation to be known as Fassifern. At this period most of the improvements were located on the original Fassifern run, and comprised the Fassifern Head Station and adjacent cultivation paddocks, four out-stations, a wash pool, wash pool paddock, and bull paddock. The Tarome improvements comprised a head station and two out-stations; and on Moogerah improvements included the head station, three out-stations, and an inn near Spicer's Peak.

The nature of the association between the Bank of Australasia and the Wienholt family in connection with Fassifern is not clear. Arthur Wienholt and his family appear to have been residing at Fassifern in the late 1860s and early 1870s. Early in 1873 the Bank transferred the lease of the consolidated Fassifern run to William, John, Edward, Arnold and Arthur Wienholt. Title to pre-emptive portion 1a, the Fassifern Head Station, was issued to the Wienholt brothers in March 1874.

From 1875 the Queensland government began resuming land for closer settlement from the consolidated Fassifern run, and during the 1870s and 1880s the Wienholts took advantage of this to gradually transform Fassifern into a freehold estate of about 44,000 acres (18,000 ha), stocked with shorthorn cattle, including a stud herd, and a stud of Clydesdale horses. In 1889 Fassifern was included among the Wienholt family's pastoral properties floated as The Wienholt Estates Company of Australia Limited with a company capital of £500,000. Other properties in this conglomerate included Maryvale near Warwick, Warenda near Boulia, and Saltern Creek and Katandra in south-west Queensland.

From at least the late 1880s and until his death in March 1893, Fassifern was managed by the Wienholt's cousin, Henry Edward Hill. A sketch of the Fassifern Station Homestead, which appeared in the 1889 Brisbane publication The Jubilee History of Queensland, shows the homestead in the same form as its present L-shaped configuration with its two chimneys, but with what appears to be a shingled roof, and separately-roofed verandahs. Whether the residence was erected for HE Hill has not been established, but the core fabric suggests a c. 1880 construction date.

Photographs of Fassifern Homestead dated c. 1899 and c. 1903 indicate that by the turn of the nineteenth and twentieth centuries the residence had been renovated but the essential form had been retained. The earlier roof had been replaced with the present hipped, bungalow-style roof of corrugated iron, extending over the verandahs. The southern end of the roof of the north-south wing had been truncated as a half-hip, and a small covered porch had been created centrally in this elevation. All the present stairs to the verandahs were extant by this period, as were the curved window hoods with the decorative timber infill to the sides, over the double-hung sashes.

Following HE Hill's death in 1893 John Daniel Wienholt (only son of Daniel Wienholt) took over management of Fassifern, residing at the head station. Renovations to the main residence may have occurred during his occupancy in the late 1890s.

In the late nineteenth century the Wienholt family began to rationalise its Queensland interests. Arthur had died in England in 1892 and Arnold in Switzerland in 1895. By this period the huge freeholds that pastoralists such as the Wienholts had amassed under earlier selection Acts (via various "peacocking" and "dummying" practices), and which tied up much valuable agricultural land, were proving expensive to sustain. Under the provisions of the Agricultural Lands Purchase Act 1894, pastoralists were encouraged to relinquish land through repurchase by the government for re-sale as farm selections. By 1902 the Wienholt Estates Company of Australia Ltd retained Fassifern, Katandra, Maryvale and Stamfordham stations, and the Jondayran Estates Company of Australia Ltd had been formed to hold Degilbo, Jondaryan, Rosewood and Tarampa.

From early 1902 to mid-1904 Daniel Wienholt (eldest son of Arthur Wienholt) took on the management of Fassifern, taking up residence at the head station. He left in mid-1904, prior to the Fassifern freehold of 41,406 acres (16,756 ha) being offered for sale by public auction on 8 August 1904. At this time the Fassifern freehold comprised 3 blocks: Kent's Lagoon (2,361 acres (955 ha) (955 hectares (2,360 acres))); Fassifern (37,351 acres (15,115 ha); and Moogerah (1,694 acres (686 ha) - the whole divided into 32 paddocks "with a good homestead and out Station, besides outbuildings and yards". Like Maryvale, for many years Fassifern had been used for fattening cattle from the Wienholt family's western stations, and was noted for its Clydesdale horse stud.

Very little of the Fassifern freehold was sold at the August auction and in September 1904 the Wienholt Estates Company offered the Fassifern Estate to the Queensland government for repurchase. The Land Commissioners who inspected the property in May 1905 found the estate well-suited to agricultural settlement, being close to the railway, with good soil, the fences in good repair, well watered, and free of noxious weeds and ticks. The manager resided in a "good building" (i.e. Fassifern Homestead) seven miles from the rail head at Munbilla.

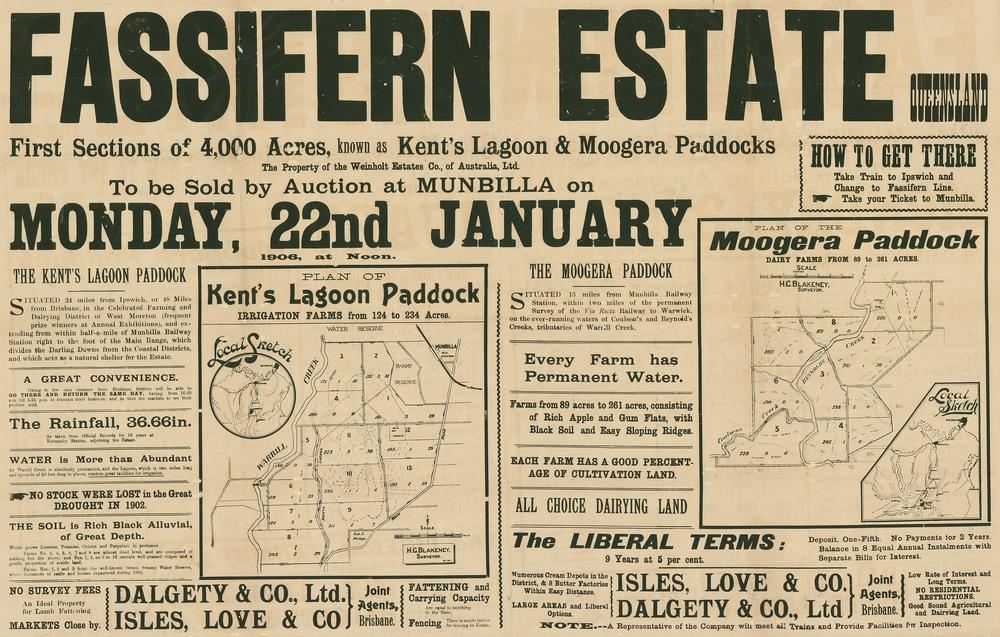
Estate map of Fassifern Estate including Moogera Paddocks and Kents Lagoon, Fassifern, Queensland, 1906

Despite the favourable report the Queensland Government took no action. In January 1906 the Wienholt Estates Company again put up the Kent's Lagoon and Moogerah paddocks for sale at auction, and offered the balance of the estate to the government at £3 per acre. Again, the estate proved difficult to sell at auction to farmers who believed that the bulk of the estate would be repurchased soon, and again the government took no action in this matter. Finally, in December 1908 a deputation of MLAs in support of the Fassifern repurchase approached the Minister for Lands (Digby Denham), but in January 1909 the Queensland government wrote to the Wienholt Estates Company firmly rejecting the offer.

In 1908 the Queensland government did repurchase the Wienholt's Maryvale estate and the manager of Maryvale for nearly 40 years, Edward Ormond Waters Hill, then took up the management of Fassifern. EOW Hill was another Wienholt cousin and brother of HE Hill who had managed Fassifern in the 1880s and early 1890s; he was also a shareholder in and director of The Wienholt Estates Company.

Also in 1908, Arnold Wienholt (son of Edward Wienholt) and his cousin Daniel Wienholt (son of Arthur Wienholt) were appointed respectively General Manager and Company Secretary of The Wienholt Estates Company of Australia Ltd, with instructions to oversee the winding up of the Company's estates in Queensland. In September 1909 they offered the bulk of the Fassifern estate for sale at auction, at which time EOW Hill acquired the Fassifern Homestead on 457 acres (185 ha), together with about 3,000 acres (1,200 ha) of grazing land.

In 1916 the homestead, located on Reynolds Creek about 4 miles (6.4 km) from Engelsburg (later Kalbar), was described as having "replaced the original house some years ago" and as "a comfortable wooden building, with water and gas laid on. It is surrounded with lawns and flower- beds, and has an orchard, vineyard, and vegetable garden attached" (Fox 1919:325).

EOW Hill resided at Fassifern Homestead until c. 1921. In 1927 title to the homestead on about 316 acres (128 ha) was transferred to Timothy Dwyer. Changes to the homestead made during Mr Dwyer's occupancy include the removal c. 1930s of an adjacent early kitchen and staff building and the extension of the south-east corner of Fassifern Homestead to accommodate an internal kitchen. Following Mr Dwyer's death in 1939, the property passed to his son, Patrick Francis Dwyer, who with his wife Joie ran a grazing farm from Fassifern Homestead until his death in 1980. Patrick was buried in the Fassifern Homestead yard. Until 2014, the house, on a substantially reduced parcel of land of just over 6,000 sq.m, remained the property of his widow, Joie Elwyn Dwyer (a former long-term Boonah Shire Councillor).

During the 1970s changes were made to the north-facing wing of the house. The timber arch dividing its two rooms was removed to create one long room and the entire corresponding length of northern verandah was enclosed. The French doors opening out onto this verandah were removed and replaced with timber-framed sliding doors with large single lights. The interior spaces were lined with fibrous-cement sheeting, but the original timber linings were retained beneath this. Other changes to the house made by Patrick and Joie Dwyer include later linings to other rooms in the house; the enclosure of part of the western verandah on the north-south wing as a bathroom and laundry; the enclosure of the north-east corner of the verandahs as an office; and the insertion of an ensuite in one of the bedrooms.

== Description ==
Fassifern Homestead on an allotment of approximately 6,000 sq m is sited on an area of slightly elevated land on the western bank of Reynolds Creek, approximately 2 kilometres (1.2 mi) south of where it joins Warrill Creek. About 1.5 kilometres (0.93 mi) to the west of the homestead, the Boonah-Fassifern Road branches off from the Cunningham Highway, very near to where the town of Fassifern had been surveyed in 1856. The small extant townships of Kalbar and Boonah lie to the north-east and east respectively. To the south-east the escarpment of Mount French and the volcanic landscape of the northern section of the Moogerah Peaks National Park overlook the site.

Built to an L-shaped plan the outer faces of which are oriented to the north and east, Fassifern Homestead has a bungalow-style hipped roof clad in corrugated iron. The southern projection of the L ends in a half-hip centred beneath which is a small gabled porch with timber framing, later lattice infill, and timber stairs. Two brick chimneystacks (one of which is a double chimney) pierce the roof ridge running parallel with the north-facing wing of the house. Four decorative sheet metal roof ventilators straddle the two roof ridges, two along each line. They consist of two cylinders surmounted by an overhanging low-pitched cone with a highly decorative edge and capping piece. Timber-framed, with exterior walls clad variously with two widths of chamferboard and weatherboards, the house is raised off the gently sloping ground on ant-capped timber stumps. The spaces between the perimeter stumps have been in-filled with painted, slatted timber screens.

The earliest discernible plan of the homestead provided for two perpendicular wings of single rooms bordered by verandahs approximately two and a half metres wide. Over time the verandahs were enclosed at various locations. A small room was enclosed on the southern corner of the north-facing wing on its western end opposite what is known as the maid's or governess' room; leaving a narrow gap to allow access between the remaining verandah spaces, which are accessed by timber stairs and bounded by balustrades consisting of top and bottom rails and dowel balusters. The verandah on the western side of the southern projection was enclosed; making what is now a laundry and bathroom that are separated from the original outer face of the house by a narrow corridor less than a metre wide. Extensive changes have been made to the north-facing wing of the house. Its two rooms focused on each fireplace are now one long room and the entire corresponding length of verandah is enclosed.

The patchwork of exterior wall cladding also gives some indication of how the house has been altered over time. The larger chamferboards, approximately 20 centimetres (7.9 in) wide, mostly line what were the exterior wall faces and are visible on the eastern verandah looking to Reynolds Creek, on the southern facade under the half-hip, and to the corridors created by the partial enclosure of the west-facing verandahs. Narrower, more recent, chamferboards clad the enclosed verandah on the north-facing wing of the house. Elsewhere there are a number of facades finished with weatherboards: on the exterior walls of the small room on the westernmost projection of the north-facing wing of the house, along the western elevation of the wing projecting south, and to the kitchen on the eastern side.

A number of original exterior French doors and windows remain in the house; these were timber-framed double doors with low waists and upper lights, and timber-framed double-hung sash windows. The double doors opening out onto the length of enclosed verandah facing north have been removed and replaced with timber-framed sliding doors with large single lights. The double doors at either end of this space have been removed, the openings widened and similar timber-framed sliders inserted. Original double doors open out of the two central rooms sandwiched between the north-facing wing and the end room of the southern projection of the plan, but there is evidence that some have been moved from their original locations. Over the remaining double-hung sashes are a number of decorative curved hoods, the sides of which are formed by timber boards with rounded ends pierced with small holes.

Inside there are three rooms where the original beaded tongue-in-groove timber wall and ceiling lining is visible: at the end of the southern projection of the plan and beside this to the north, as well as in the small room formed at the joint of the two wings of the house. The first two rooms are painted, while the third is not. It is reputed to be the lumber room and would have provided access between the western length of verandah and the formal living and dining rooms of the north-facing wing. Where the original lining remains there are simple timber cornices and picture rails, however later lengths of timber beading have replaced the skirting boards. The wall and ceiling linings are largely fibrous cement sheeting in the private and utilitarian rooms, with an area of more recent vertical timber tongue-in-groove boarding to the west-facing laundry and bathroom. The rooms changed during the 1970s renovation are lined with unpainted sheeting held within a framework of flat metal. The floors are lined with carpet, vinyl or tiles. Only on the unenclosed verandahs is the original timber boarding visible. The ceiling on the western verandah is unlined.

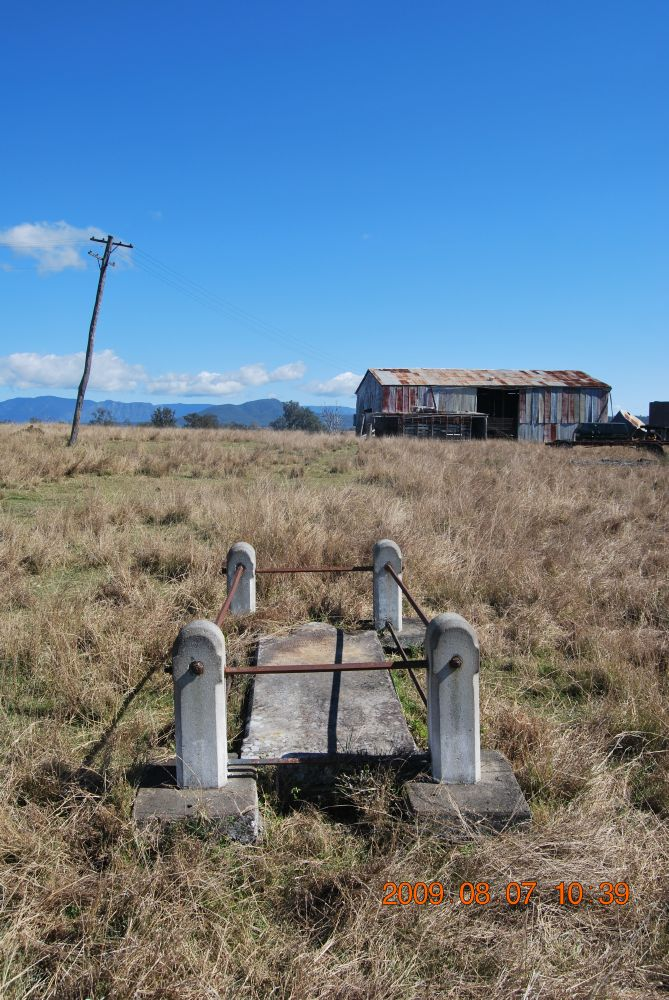
Grave, 2009

The homestead is centrally located within the allotment, the boundary of which is marked on all sides except the northern one with a low, painted post-and-rail fence. The block is grassed and features a number of mature trees, as well as more recent shrubs, mostly around the perimeter, and a number of garden beds close to the house, most particularly in front of the east-facing verandah. In the garden bed adjacent to the northern elevation of the house is an early grape vine, which possibly dates to the early 1900s. On the northern edge of the site, toward the western corner of the block, is a bunya pine (Araucaria bidwillii), which is one of three visible in a number of photographs dating from the late nineteenth and very early twentieth centuries. In the south-west corner is the grave of Patrick Dwyer marked with a stone/concrete memorial and surrounded by a number of trees. There are two garages sited at the edges of the allotment: one entered off the easement near the grave and another near the south-eastern corner of the house accessed from the east. Both have gable roofs; one is clad with vertical timber boarding and the other with vertical steel cladding. The latter garage is later and is not considered to be of cultural heritage significance. There is a fenced pool in the north-east corner of the site (also not of cultural heritage significance). Four painted iron gates open through the perimeter fence line: a wide double one near the north-western corner of the site, two single ones that align with the doors opening out of either end of the north-facing wing of the house and the respective verandah stairs, and another that aligns with the south-facing porch. The single gate that opens through the eastern boundary fence sits near a large stand of mature bougainvillea, which is on an adjoining allotment. The 1846 grave of Margaret Coulson, marked with an engraved headstone, is located approximately 15 metres (49 ft) to the south of the single gate that opens through the southern boundary fence, again on a separate allotment to the homestead block.

== Heritage listing ==
Fassifern Homestead was listed on the Queensland Heritage Register on 13 November 2008 having satisfied the following criteria.

The place is important in demonstrating the evolution or pattern of Queensland's history.

Fassifern Homestead, constructed by the late 1880s with late 1890s renovations, is important in demonstrating the pattern of pastoral consolidation in Queensland as pastoral lessees gradually gained freehold title to large blocks of prime grazing and agricultural land, especially in southern Queensland. The simply-adorned but substantially-constructed timber residence replaced an earlier Fassifern Homestead on the same site (established by 1846) and demonstrates the transformation from the mid-1870s of the consolidated Fassifern run, established under occupation license in the 1840s as the runs of Fassifern, Moogerah and Tarome, into a substantial freehold of approximately 44,000 acres (18,000 ha).

The place has a special association with the life or work of a particular person, group or organisation of importance in Queensland's history.

From 1857 the Fassifern run was associated with the prominent Wienholt family (pastoralists, business persons and politicians) and became an integral element in a chain of Queensland pastoral properties acquired by them and their business partners from 1849. From the 1870s the consolidated Fassifern run was used principally to fatten cattle from the family's western Queensland properties, and along with the neighbouring Maryvale run on the Darling Downs (the first of the Wienholt acquisitions in Queensland), was renowned for its Clydesdale horse stud. As the principal residence on an extensive freehold estate, Fassifern Homestead has a special association with the Wienholt family's consolidation of their wealth in Queensland. Of the 48 Queensland runs held by the family by 1876, Fassifern was situated closest to Brisbane, and was home to a number of the Wienholt family over two generations, and to their cousins, Henry Edward Hill and Edward Ormond Waters Hill, who managed Fassifern and Maryvale stations for many years.
