= Dugandan railway line =

Railway line in Queensland, Australia

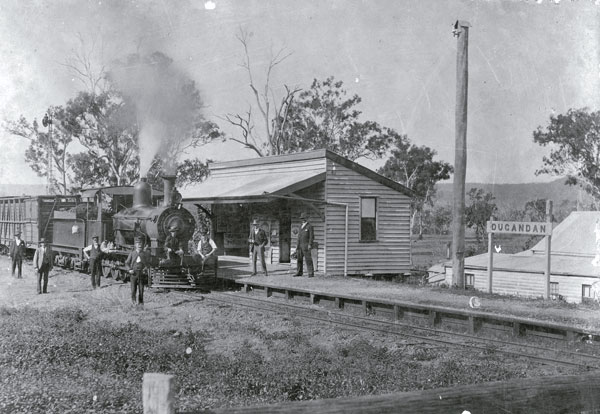
- Dugandan Railway Station, near Boonah, circa 1930

Overview
- Other name(s): Fassifern railway line Churchill branch railway
- Locale: Queensland, Australia

History
- Opened: 1882
- Closed: 1964

Technical
- Line length: 35 miles 28 chains (56.9 km)

The Dugandan railway line was a branch railway in the Scenic Rim region of South East Queensland, Australia. It was also known as the Fassifern railway line. It operated from 1882 to 1964.

== Geography ==
The line began west of Ipswich station on the Main Line 39 km west of Brisbane and proceeded generally southward for approximately 50 km to the locality of Dugandan now part of the urban settlement of Boonah.

== History ==
Residents in the Fassifern Valley petitioned the Queensland Government to build a railway line to their district, and the first section was opened on 10 July 1882 as far as Harrisville. This is considered to be Queensland's first branch railway. The branch was extended to Dugandan on 12 September 1887.

The Mount Edwards branch line branched off the Dugandan line at Munbilla. The Mount Edwards line opened to Kalbar on 17 April 1916 and to Mount Edwards on 7 October 1922. The Mount Edwards line closed in 1960.

During its life, the Dugandan branch carried mixed traffic, including goods trains, mixed trains and rail motors.

The Dugandan branch was closed beyond the Churchill railway station on 30 June 1964 due to increasing competition from road transport. The small remaining section was known as the Churchill branch railway.

== Route ==
Stations and other points of interest on the route
Distance	Name	Coordinates	Altitude	Notes
24 miles 07 chains (38.8 km) from Brisbane, 0 miles 0 chains (0 km) from Ipswich	Ipswich railway station	27.6131°S 152.7606°E	62 feet (19 m)	
	Fassifern Junction where the Dugandan line splits from the Main Line railway	27.61551°S 152.74947°E		
1 km from Ipswich	Shillito & Sons siding			
1 km from Ipswich	Spanns siding			
25 miles 31 chains (40.9 km) from Brisbane	Little Ipswich railway station	27.6216°S 152.7504°E	97 feet (30 m)	
2 km from Ipswich	Noble Vale No 6. Colliery siding			
3 km from Ipswich	Cattle siding			
26 miles 21 chains (42.3 km) from Brisbane	Churchill railway station	27.6356°S 152.7486°E	77 feet (23 m)	
29 miles 28 chains (47.2 km) from Brisbane	Loamside railway station	27.6711°S 152.7364°E	155 feet (47 m)	
13 miles 78 chains (22.5 km) from Brisbane	Hampstead railway station	27.69364°S 152.73846°E	118 feet (36 m)	
32 miles 14 chains (51.8 km) from Brisbane	Purga railway station	27.71008°S 152.73864°E	162 feet (49 m)	
34 miles 0 chains (54.7 km) from Brisbane	Goolman railway station	27.7365°S 152.7416°E	137 feet (42 m)	
34 miles 74 chains (56.2 km) from Brisbane, 10 miles 57 chains (17.2 km) from Ipswich	Hillside railway station	27.7497°S 152.7367°E	154 feet (47 m)	
11 miles 687 chains (31.5 km) from Ipswich	Rockton railway station	27.7639°S 152.7380°E	155 feet (47 m)	
12 miles 73 chains (20.8 km) from Ipswich	Peak Crossing railway station	27.7789°S 152.7329°E	165 feet (50 m)	
13 miles 72 chains (22.4 km) from Ipswich	Flinders railway station	27.7886°S 152.7217°E	247 feet (75 m)	
15 miles 77 chains (25.7 km) from Ipswich	Churchbank railway station	27.7891°S 152.6916°E	155 feet (47 m)	
18 miles 50 chains (30.0 km) from Ipswich	Harrisville railway station	27.8110°S 152.6666°E	179 feet (55 m)	
20 miles 54 chains (33.3 km) from Ipswich	Wilsons Plains railway station	27.8362°S 152.6556°E	188 feet (57 m)	
22 miles 09 chains (35.6 km) from Ipswich	Radford railway station	27.8541°S 152.6437°E	194 feet (59 m)	
23 miles 64 chains (38.3 km) from Ipswich	Munbilla railway station	27.8711°S 152.6561°E	278 feet (85 m)	
	Junction with Mount Edwards railway line	27.8714°S 152.6563°E		
25 miles 12 chains (40.5 km) from Ipswich	Anthony railway station	27.8836°S 152.6731°E	398 feet (121 m)	
27 miles 14 chains (43.7 km) from Ipswich	Blantyre railway station	27.9056°S 152.6832°E	543 feet (166 m)	
28 miles 05 chains (45.2 km) from Ipswich	Roadvale railway station	27.9164°S 152.6839°E	554 feet (169 m)	
29 miles 07 chains (46.8 km) from Ipswich	Kulgun railway station	27.9314°S 152.6831°E	570 feet (170 m)	
30 miles 41 chains (49.1 km) from Ipswich	Teviotville railway station	27.9472°S 152.6867°E	600 feet (180 m)	
32 miles 45 chains (52.4 km) from Ipswich	Hoya railway station	27.9706°S 152.6891°E	427 feet (130 m)	
34 miles 65 chains (56.0 km) from Ipswich	Boonah railway station	27.9969°S 152.6816°E	332 feet (101 m)	
35 miles 28 chains (56.9 km) from Ipswich	Dugandan railway station	28.0039°S 152.6777°E	299 feet (91 m)	

== Legacy ==
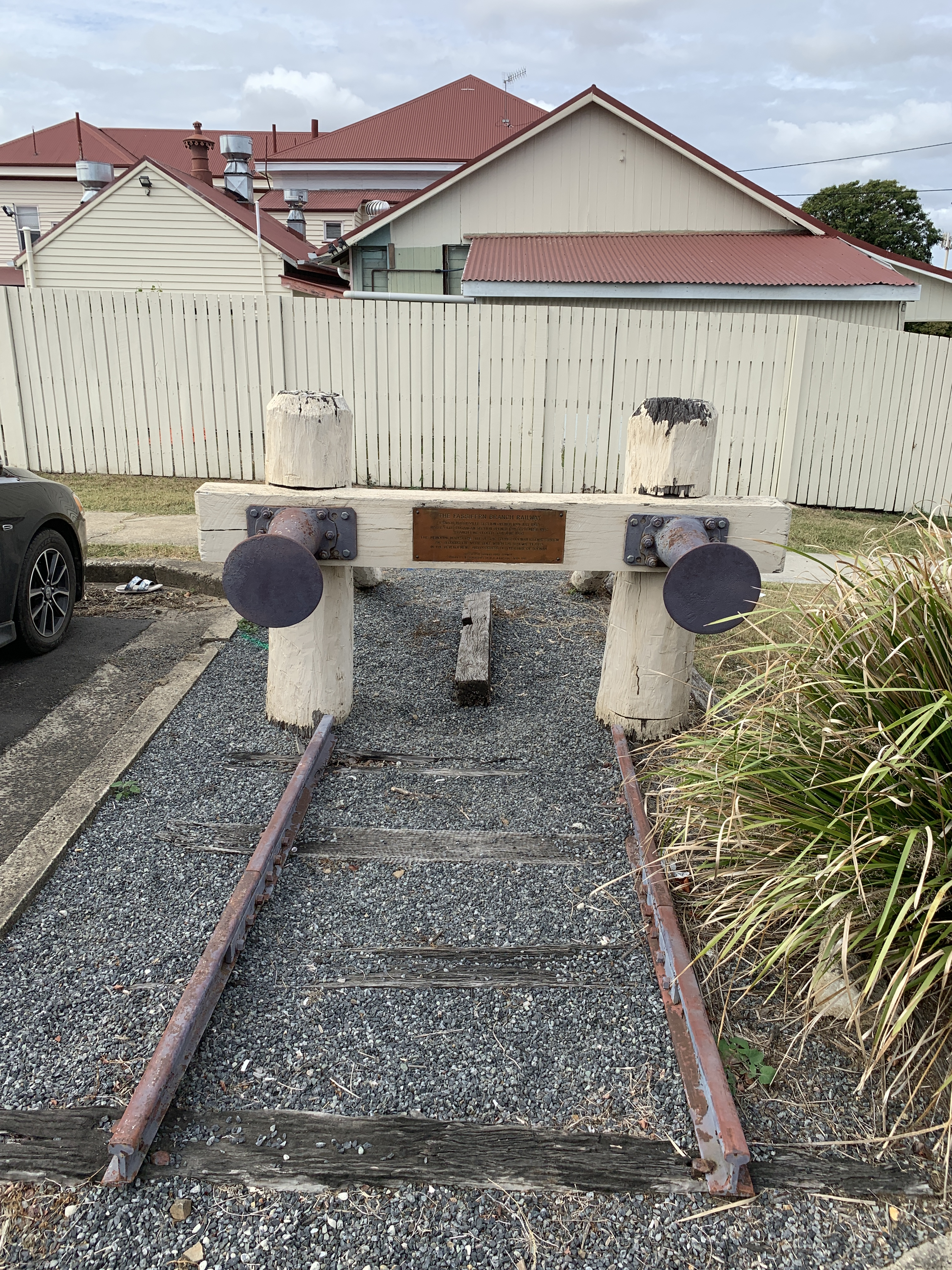
Fassifern Branch Railway Memorial, 2020

There is a memorial to the railway line in Yeates Street, Boonah at the back of the Commercial Hotel (27.99714°S 152.68176°E). The memorial is on the site of the former Boonah railway station.

Some evidence of the line's existence remains today. An embankment which carried the railway over a floodplain immediately north of Boonah is still readily visible from the Boonah-Fassifern Road. The station building at Harrisville is still intact, as is a small cutting immediately south of Harrisville station. Part of the alignment between Boonah and Dugandan along a cut-and-fill embankment is now a paved footpath through an urban park.

As of 2009, the Scenic Rim Region is developing a rail trail in partnership with the Queensland state government. The trail for the use of bushwalkers, cyclists and horse riders will follow some of the former alignment between Ipswich and Boonah.

== Gallery ==
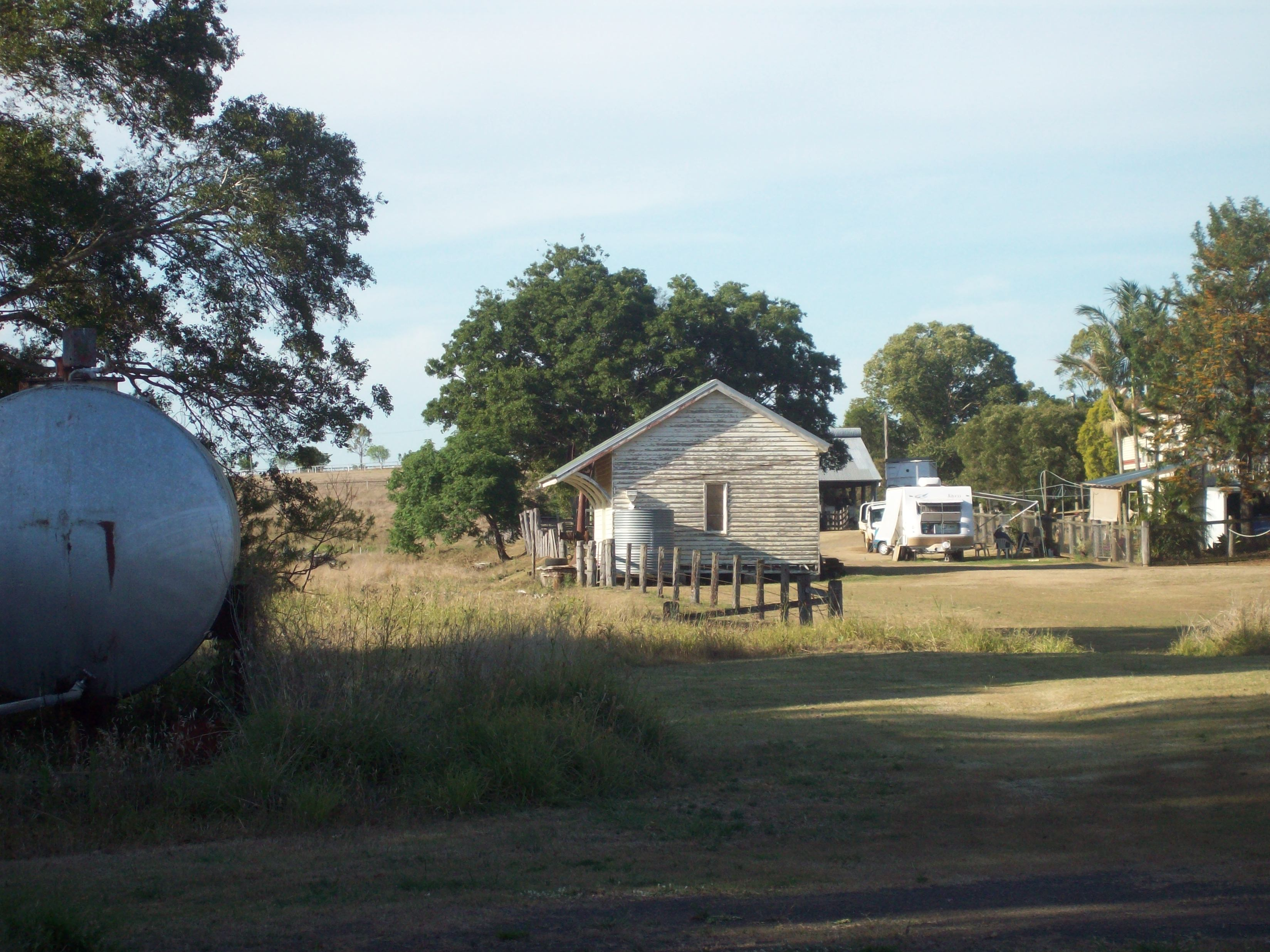
Harrisville railway station

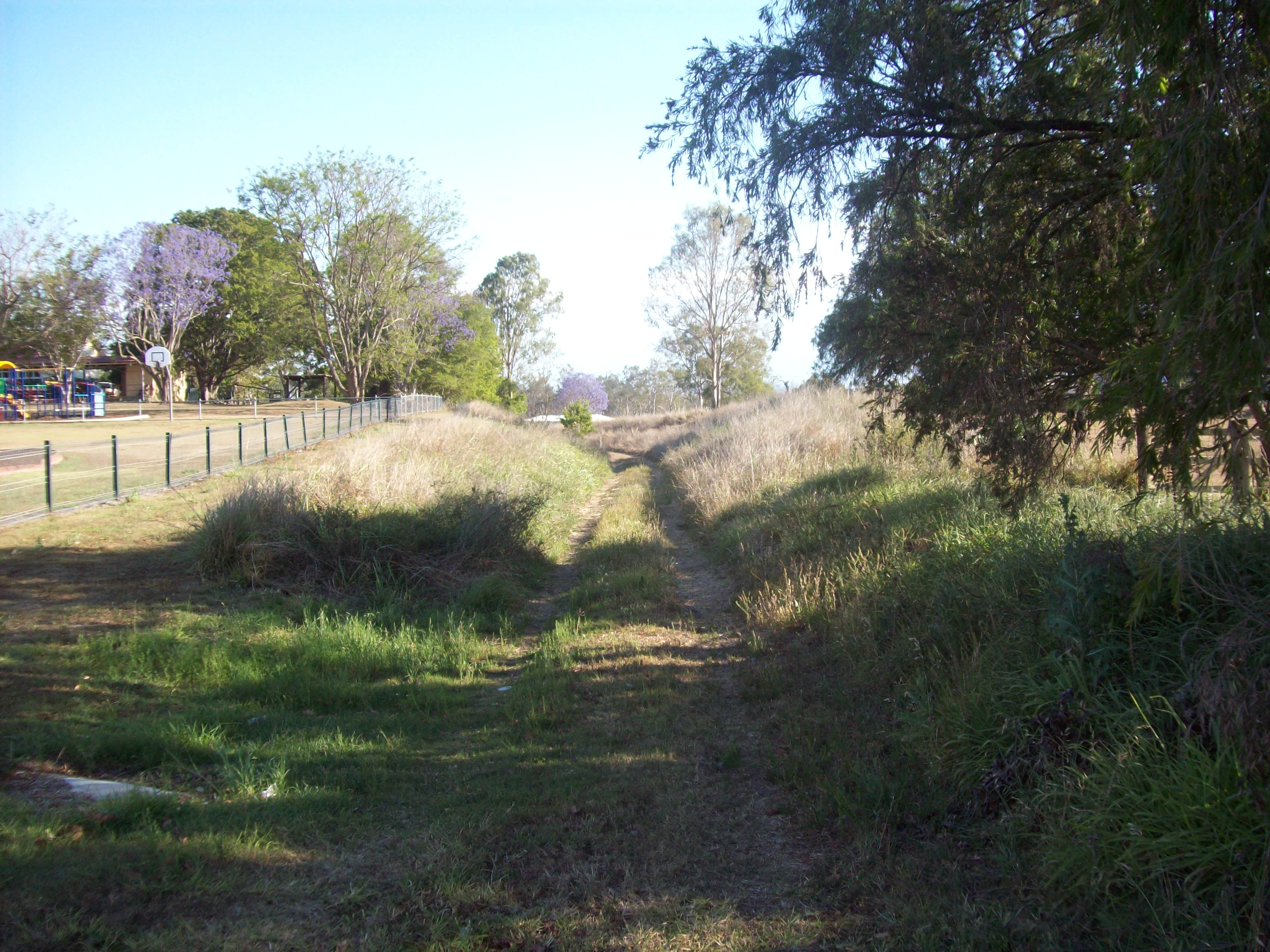
Shallow railway cutting in Harrisville

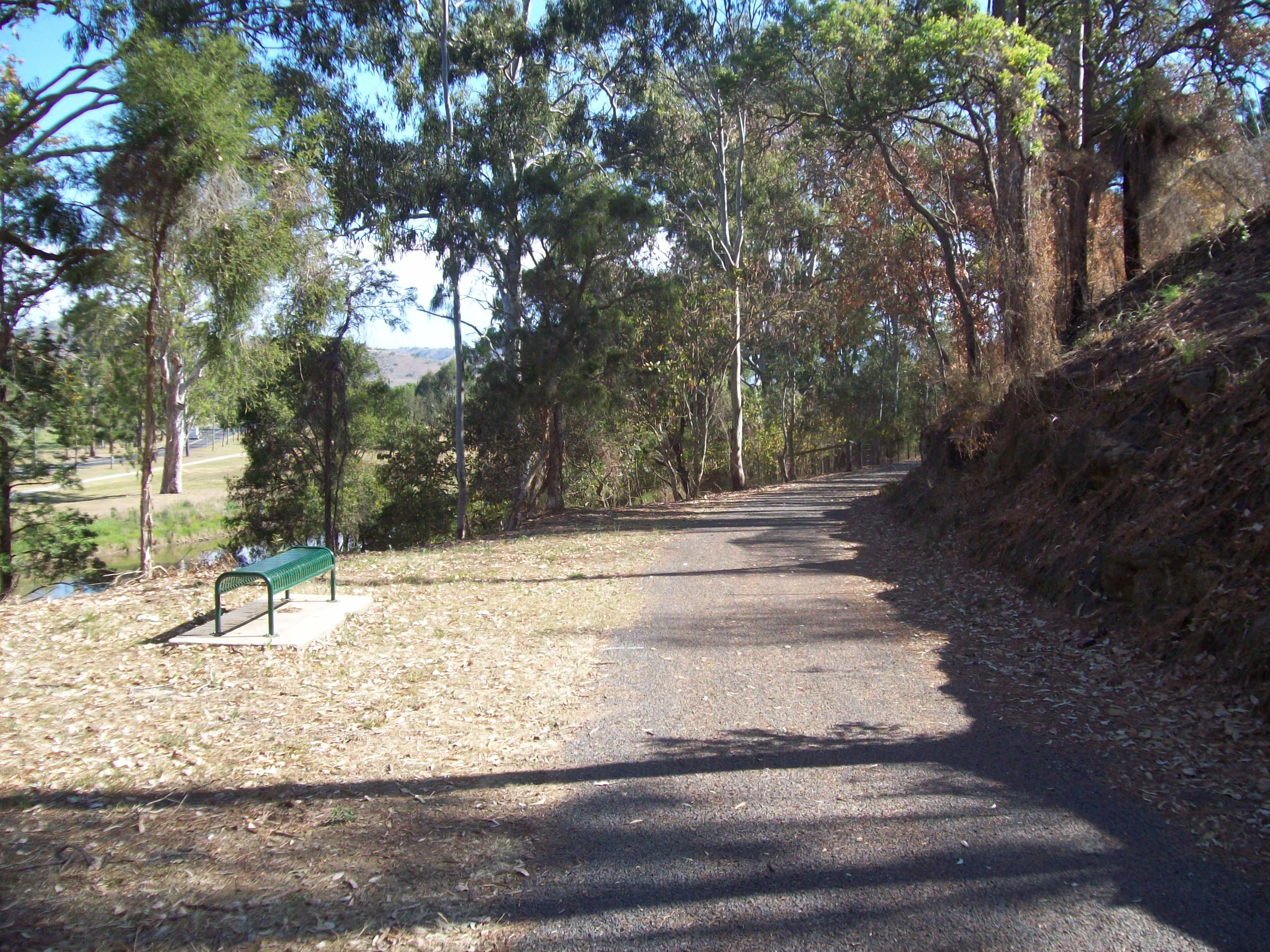
Former track formation between Boonah and Dugandan with a cutting on the right, now a footpath through a park

== See also ==
- Rail transport in Queensland
