= Kulgun, Queensland =

Kulgun
- Suburb
- Interactive map of Kulgun
- Coordinates: 27.9305°S 152.6825°E
- Country: Australia
- State: Queensland
- LGA: Scenic Rim Region
- Location: 9.7 km (6.0 mi) N of Boonah; 37.1 km (23.1 mi) W of Beaudesert; 42.0 km (26.1 mi) SSW of Ipswich CBD; 81.1 km (50.4 mi) SW of Brisbane CBD

Government
  - State electorate: Scenic Rim
  - Federal division: Wright

Area
  - Total: 4.6 km^{2} (1.8 sq mi)

Population
  - Total: 104 (2021 census)
  - Density: 22.6/km^{2} (58.6/sq mi)
- Time zone: UTC+10:00 (AEST)
- Postcode: 4309
Suburbs around Kulgun
Roadvale	Roadvale	Roadvale
Obum Obum	Kulgun	Roadvale
Teviotville	Teviotville	Teviotville

Kulgun is a rural locality in the Scenic Rim Region, Queensland, Australia. In the 2021 census, Kulgun had a population of 104 people.

== Geography ==
The principal land use is grazing with a small amount of cropping.

== History ==
The locality takes its name from its former railway station. The station was originally called Schneiders Road, but was changed by the Queensland Railway Department in 1908. Kulgun is an Aboriginal word meaning track or road.

The Fassifern railway line (Queensland's first branch railway line) opened from Ipswich to Harrisville on 10 July 1882. On 12 September 1887 the line was extended to Dugundan with Kulgun being served by Kulgun railway station on Kulgun Road (27.9314°S 152.6831°E). The line closed in June 1964.

The Siloam Baptist Church was established circa 1896. Following the opening of a new Baptist church in neighbouring Roadvale in 1947, the Siloam Baptist church was little used and, in 1951, was relocated to 4725 Cunningham Highway, Warrill View, where it continued to be used as a Baptist church until 1975, after which it was converted in a house (still extant as at 2023).

== Demographics ==
Kulgun has a population of 67 at the 2016 census. The locality contained 23 households, in which 52.2% of the population were males and 47.8% of the population were females with a median age of 38, the same as the national average. The average weekly household income was $1,583, $145 below the national average.

In the 2021 census, Kulgun had a population of 104 people.

== Education ==
There are no schools in Kulgun. The nearest government primary schools are Roadvale State School in neighbouring Roadvale to the north-east and Kalbar State School in Kalbar to the south-west. The nearest government secondary school is Boonah State High School in Boonah. to the south. There is also a Catholic primary school in Boonah.
