= Wilsons Plains =

- Suburb
- Interactive map of Wilsons Plains
- Coordinates: 27.8416°S 152.6511°E
- Country: Australia
- State: Queensland
- LGA: Scenic Rim Region
- Location: 23.8 km (14.8 mi) N of Boonah; 32.1 km (19.9 mi) SSW of Ipswich; 51.3 km (31.9 mi) NW of Beaudesert; 73.1 km (45.4 mi) SW of Brisbane CBD

Government
  - State electorate: Scenic Rim
  - Federal division: Wright

Area
  - Total: 10.8 km^{2} (4.2 sq mi)

Population
  - Total: 62 (2021 census)
  - Density: 5.74/km^{2} (14.87/sq mi)
- Time zone: UTC+10:00 (AEST)
- Postcode: 4307
Suburbs around Wilsons Plains
Warrill View	Harrisville	Harrisville
Radford	Wilsons Plains	Milora
Radford	Radford	Milora

Wilsons Plains is a rural locality in the Scenic Rim Region, Queensland, Australia. In the 2021 census, Wilsons Plains had a population of 62 people.

== Geography ==
Warrill Creek forms the north-western boundary.

The Cunningham Highway passes close to the western extremity.

== History ==
The Fassifern railway line (Queensland's first branch railway line) opened from Ipswich to Harrisville on 10 July 1882. On 12 September 1887 the line was extended to Dugundan with Wilsons Plains being served by Wilsons Plains railway station on the corner of Wilsons Plains Road and Redhill Road (27.8362°S 152.6556°E). The line closed in June 1964.

== Demographics ==
In the 2016 census, Wilsons Plains had a population of 50 people.

In the 2021 census, Wilsons Plains had a population of 62 people.

== Heritage listing ==
Wilsons Plains has the following heritage-listed sites:

- Trelawney Cheese Factory Refrigerator Shed, 422 Wilsons Plains Road (27.83875°S 152.63973°E)

== Education ==
There are no schools in Wilsons Plains. The nearest government primary schools are Harrisville State School in neighbouring Harrisville to the north and Warrill View State School in neighbouring Warrill View to the north-west. The nearest government secondary school is Boonah State High School in Boonah to the south-east. There is also a Catholic primary school in Boonah.
