= Silverdale, Queensland =

Silverdale
- Suburb
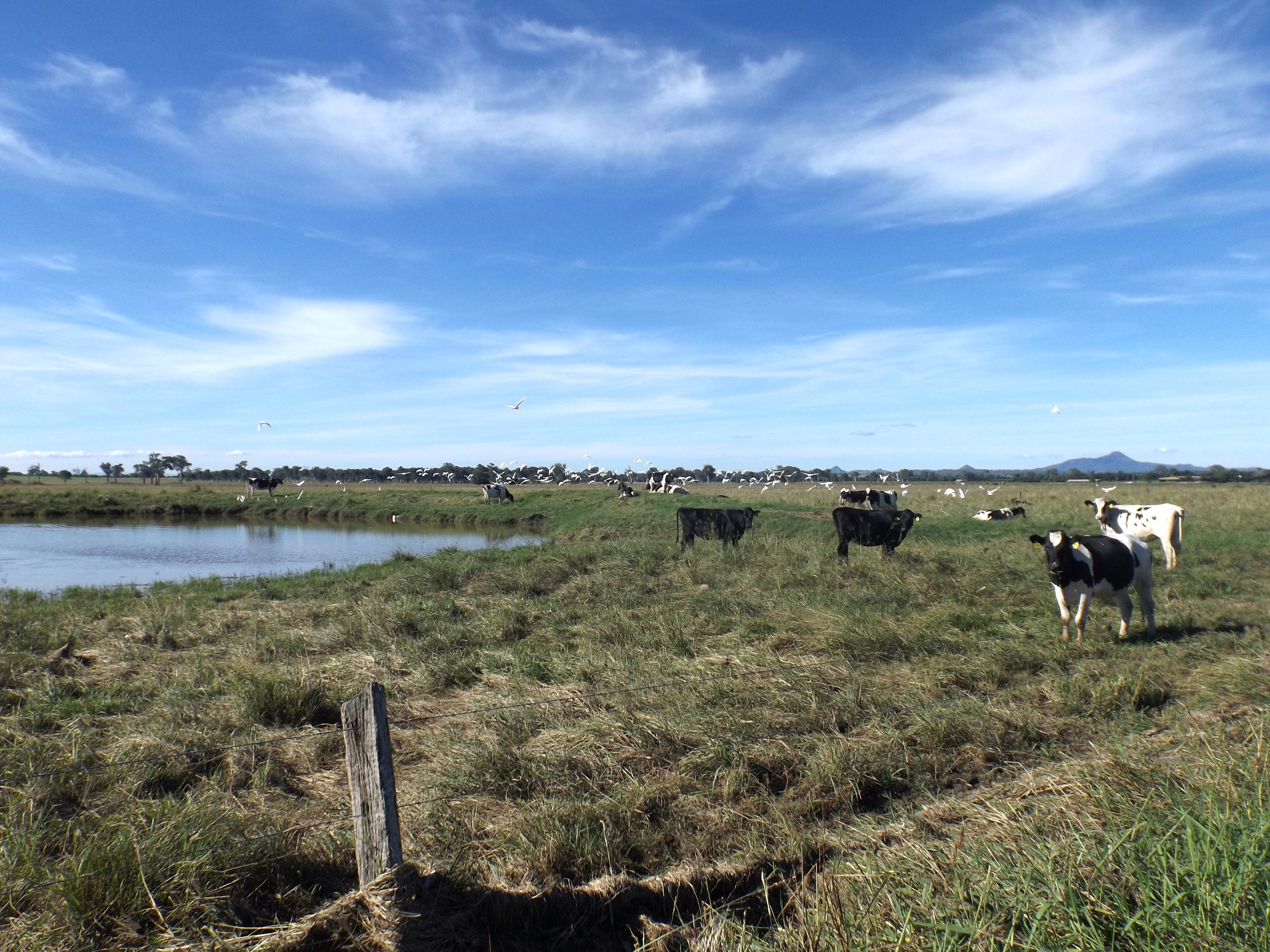
- Paddocks along Kengoon Road, 2015

- Interactive map of Silverdale
- Coordinates: 27.8880°S 152.5966°E
- Country: Australia
- State: Queensland
- LGA: Scenic Rim Region
- Location: 18.0 km (11.2 mi) NW of Boonah; 39.2 km (24.4 mi) S of Rosewood; 42.3 km (26.3 mi) SSW of Ipswich; 49.8 km (30.9 mi) WNW of Beaudesert; 81.4 km (50.6 mi) SW of Brisbane

Government
  - State electorate: Scenic Rim
  - Federal division: Wright

Area
  - Total: 38.8 km^{2} (15.0 sq mi)

Population
  - Total: 112 (2021 census)
  - Density: 2.887/km^{2} (7.48/sq mi)
- Time zone: UTC+10:00 (AEST)
- Postcode: 4307
Suburbs around Silverdale
Rosevale	Warrill View	Radford
Rosevale	Silverdale	Munbilla
Frazerview	Kalbar	Kents Lagoon

Silverdale is a rural locality in the Scenic Rim Region, Queensland, Australia. In the 2021 census, Silverdale had a population of 112 people.

== Geography ==
Silverdale is located in the Fassifern Valley. The westery boundary of the locality is Warroolaba Creek and the eastern boundary is Warrill Creek, a tributary of the Bremer River.

The Cunningham Highway enters the locality from the north (Warrill View) and exits to the south (Kalbar).

The terrain varies in elevation from 60 to 210 metres (200 to 690 ft) above sea level. There are no named peaks.

The land use is predominantly grazing on native vegetation.

== History ==
In July 1909, a public meeting was held to discuss the opening of a school in the district; the committee believed 32 students would attend the school. Tenders were called to construct the school building in November 1909; W.C. Cowell's tender for £183/15/0 was accepted in December 1909. Silverdale State School opened on 23 May 1910. It closed on 28 January 1963 and the students transferred to Engelsburg State School (now Kalbar State School) in Kalbar. The school was at 5382 Cunningham Highway (27.8875°S 152.6114°E).

== Demographics ==
In the 2011 census, Silverdale was included in the census count for Munbilla with a total population of 434.

In the 2016 census, Silverdale had a population of 120 people.

In the 2021 census, Silverdale had a population of 112 people.

== Education ==
There are no schools in Silverdale. The nearest government primary schools are:

- Warrill View State School in neighbouring Warrill View to the north
- Kalbar State School in neighbouring Kalbar to the south
- Aratula State School in Aratula to the south-west

The nearest government secondary schools are Boonah State High School in Boonah to the south-east and Rosewood State High School in Rosewood to the north.

== Facilities ==
Silverdale has one of more than 30 cattle tick clearing facilities in Queensland.

== Events ==
The locality is home to the Annual Silverdale Show and Sale of cattle.
