= Obum Obum, Queensland =

Obum Obum
- Suburb
- Interactive map of Obum Obum
- Coordinates: 27.9230°S 152.6544°E
- Country: Australia
- State: Queensland
- LGA: Scenic Rim Region
- Location: 13.4 km (8.3 mi) NW of Boonah; 40.9 km (25.4 mi) SSW of Ipswich; 43.7 km (27.2 mi) WNW of Beaudesert; 80.0 km (49.7 mi) SW of Brisbane

Government
  - State electorate: Scenic Rim
  - Federal division: Wright

Area
  - Total: 11.0 km^{2} (4.2 sq mi)

Population
  - Total: 129 (2021 census)
  - Density: 11.73/km^{2} (30.37/sq mi)
- Time zone: UTC+10:00 (AEST)
- Postcode: 4309
Suburbs around Obum Obum
Kents Lagoon	Munbilla	Blantyre
Kalbar	Obum Obum	Roadvale
Kalbar	Kalbar	Kulgun; Teviotville

Obum Obum is a rural locality in the Scenic Rim Region, Queensland, Australia. In the 2021 census, Obum Obum had a population of 129 people.

== Geography ==
The creeks that rise in the locality contribute ultimately to the Bremer River, which is a tributary of the Brisbane River which flows into Moreton Bay.

The predominant land use is grazing with some crop growing.

== History ==
Obum Obum Provisional School opened on 24 January 1899. It became Obum Obum State School on 1 January 1909. It closed in 1946 and its students were transferred to Engelsburg State School in Kalbar (later renamed Kalbar State School). It was at 210 Roberts Road (corner of Obum Obum Road, 27.91268°S 152.65588°E).

== Demographics ==
In the 2016 census, Obum Obum had a population of 131 people.

In the 2021 census, Obum Obum had a population of 129 people.

== Education ==
There are no schools in Obum Obum. The nearest government primary schools are Kalbar State School in neighbouring Kalbar to the south-east and Roadvale State School in neighbouring Roadvale to the east. The nearest government secondary school is Boonah State High School in Boonah to the south-east.
