= Mount Edwards railway line =

Former railway line in South East Queensland, Australia

The Mount Edwards railway line was a branch railway in the Scenic Rim region of South East Queensland, Australia. The lines serves a number of small towns in the Fassifern Valley. The first stage of the Mount Edwards line opened from Munbilla to Engelsburg (now Kalbar) on 17 April 1916, but the next stage to Mount Edwards was not completed until 7 October 1922. The line closed on 1 November 1960.

== Geography ==
The 25 km long line branched off the Dugandan line at the rural locality of Munbilla 38 km south of the city of Ipswich. The line then proceeded in a generally south-westerly direction to the locality of Mount Edwards near the village of Aratula.

== History ==
The line was intended to form part of a via recta (Latin, "straight route") between Brisbane and Sydney via the break-of-gauge border town of Wallangarra. Before the completion of the New South Wales North Coast Line in 1930, rail traffic between the two state capitals travelled west from Brisbane to Toowoomba then south to Wallangarra via Warwick. The via recta was to incorporate the Mount Edwards line and the Maryvale line on the other side of the Great Dividing Range to produce a direct route southwest from Brisbane to Warwick, shaving around 95 km off the interstate journey. However, the via recta was never completed.

== Route ==
Stations on the Mount Edwards railway line
Distance from Ipswich	Name	Coordinates	Altitude	Notes
	Junction with Dugundan line	27.8714°S 152.6563°E		Immediately south-west of Munbilla railway station.
26 miles 56 chains (43.0 km)	Warperta	27.90333°S 152.63278°E	247 feet (75 m)	On Munbillla Road (now in Kents Lagoon).
29 miles 39 chains (47.5 km)	Kalbar	27.93924°S 152.62090°E	262 feet (80 m)	At the western end of Railway Street in Kalbar.
31 miles 34 chains (50.6 km)	Warumkarie	27.95715°S 152.61082°E	308 feet (94 m)	On Warumkarie Road (now in the south of Kalbar).
32 miles 60 chains (52.7 km)	Fassifern Valley	27.97297°S 152.59979°E	295 feet (90 m)	On Lake Moogerah Road.
34 miles 30 chains (55.3 km)	Morwincha	27.97299°S 152.57734°E	312 feet (95 m)	On the bend in Morwincha Road.
36 miles 2 chains (58.0 km)	Aratula	27.98252°S 152.55450°E	357 feet (109 m)	At the eastern end of Sawmill Road.
39 miles 70 chains (64.2 km)	Mount Edwards	28.02136°S 152.51578°E	621 feet (189 m)	Terminus, on the southern corner of the Cunningham Highway and Lake Moogerah Road

== See also ==
- Rail transport in Queensland
