= Wiss House =

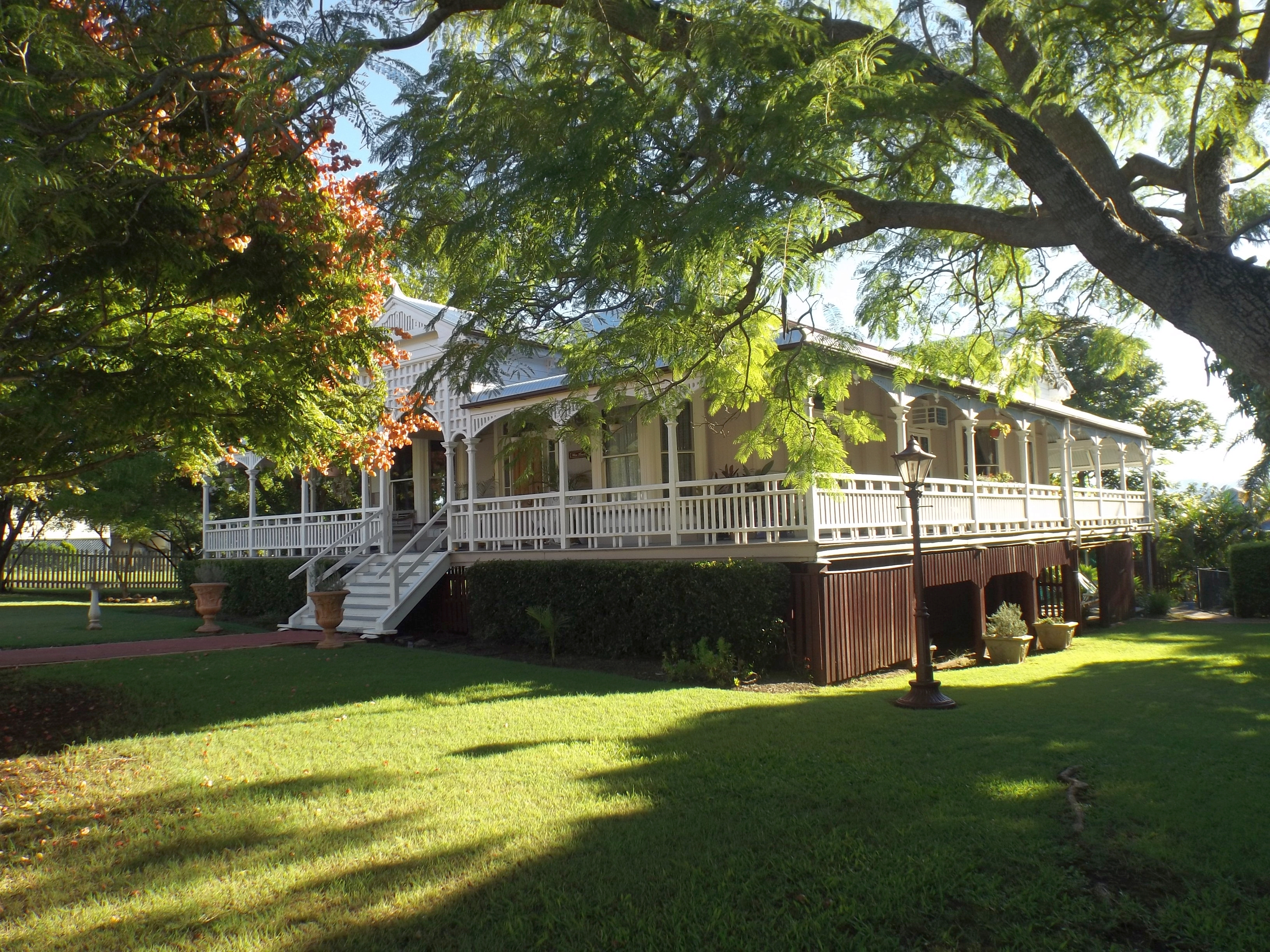
- House and gardens, 2015

- Location within Queensland Location within Australia
- 27.9408°S 152.6249°E
- Location: 7 Ann Street, Kalbar, Queensland, Australia

History
- Design period: 1900 - 1914 (early 20th century)
- Built: c. 1912 - 1940s

Queensland Heritage Register
- Official name: Wiss House (former)
- Type: state heritage (landscape, built)
- Designated: 26 August 1993
- Reference no.: 601137
- Significant period: 1910s, 1940s (fabric); 1910s-1970s (historical, social)
- Significant components: air raid shelter, trees/plantings, residential accommodation - main house, service wing

Wiss House is a heritage-listed detached house at 7 Ann Street, Kalbar, Queensland, Australia. It was built from c. 1912 to 1940s. It was added to the Queensland Heritage Register on 26 August 1993.

== History ==
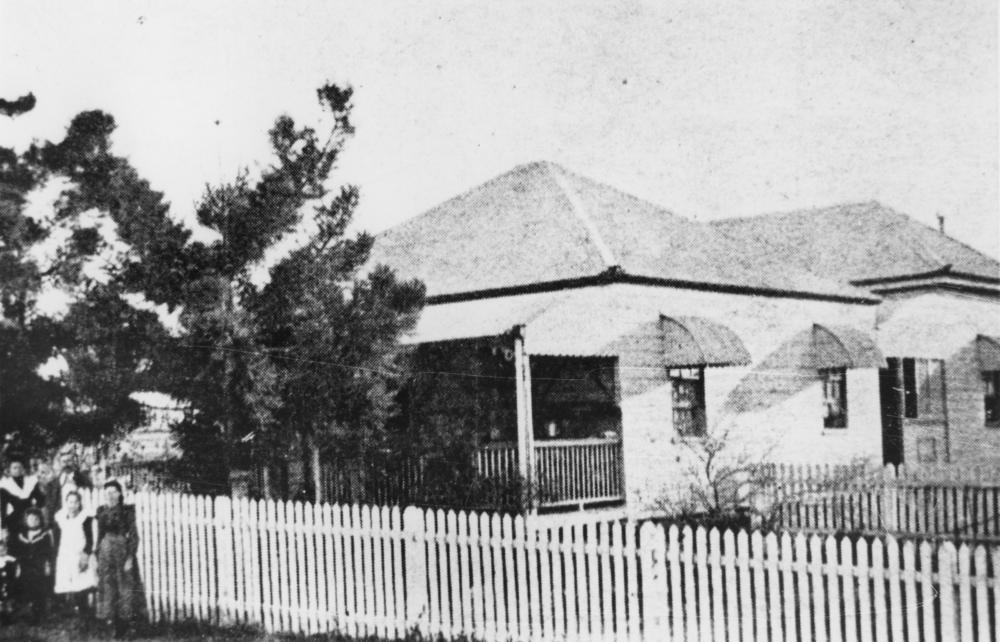
Wiss house, circa 1903

This large timber house was erected for Lionel Ainger Wiss and his family following the mid-1912 acquisition of the Ann Street site in his wife's name.

LA Wiss had arrived in Queensland from Germany with his brothers Campbell and Alfred, c.1887. They were German-born sons of English parents. After a short time in northern Queensland, Alfred returned to England and Lionel and Campbell moved to Ipswich, where they worked for grocers W Siemon & Sons for about three years.

In mid-1890 the brothers acquired an acre of land at Engelsburg, in the heart of the Fassifern Scrub district, south of Ipswich, which had been settled in the 1870s by immigrant German farmers. At this time, the township of Engelsburg comprised a general store, two saddlers, a cabinetmaker and glazier, a hotel and store, a butcher's shop, timber yard and blacksmith. The Engelsburg State School had been established in 1885. There were two Lutheran churches in the district, a Baptist church, a Primitive Methodist church, a Catholic church, and a small Salvation Army meeting hall. Much of the brigalow scrub had been cleared, and the surrounding district was dotted with small farm selections of 60, 80 or 120 acres.

On their Engelsburg property, adjacent to Heinrich Welge's Fassifern Hotel on the principal road from Ipswich to the Fassifern head station, the Wiss brothers erected a small store and adjacent dwelling. In August 1890, Ipswich architect Henry Edmund Wyman called tenders for a store and dwelling to be erected at Engelsburg, and by September 1890, a store for Lionel Wiss was being constructed there.

Lionel married Danish immigrant Maria Elise Wiuff at Ipswich in late 1890, and in the same year joined Campbell in partnership as Wiss Bros, storekeepers, at Engelsburg. Wiss Bros was one of the earliest businesses in the town, which was emerging as a district centre following the closer settlement of the Fassifern Scrub for dairying and agriculture. Campbell Wiss had left the partnership by c.1904, but the name Wiss Bros was retained.

The firm prospered, a new store was erected in 1909, and Wiss Bros became one of the most important businesses in the district. Lionel ('Daddy') Wiss was a highly respected local identity, who took a prominent role in the community and the local Methodist church. In 1910, he acquired 56 acres in the centre of Engelsburg. About half of this he subdivided in 1916 into residential allotments, thereby creating most of the western half of the town of Engelsburg (renamed Kalbar in 1916 when the railway reached the town).

Despite owning acreage on the western side of George Street, when selecting a site for a more substantial family residence, Lionel Wiss chose four allotments in Annie Krause's 1912 residential subdivision of the eastern half of Engelsburg. The site at the corner of Ann and William Streets, on the small rise overlooking the township centre, was a prime location, and the house was amongst the first erected on the hill.

Lionel Wiss died in 1932. His wife, Maria Elise, resided in the Ann Street house until her death in 1957, and his daughters Adeline and Phyllis remained there until the mid-1970s, when the property was sold. Adeline ran Wiss Bros until the business was sold in 1947.

An underground air-raid shelter was constructed in the backyard during the Second World War. It is not clear whether remnants of this are extant.

== Description ==
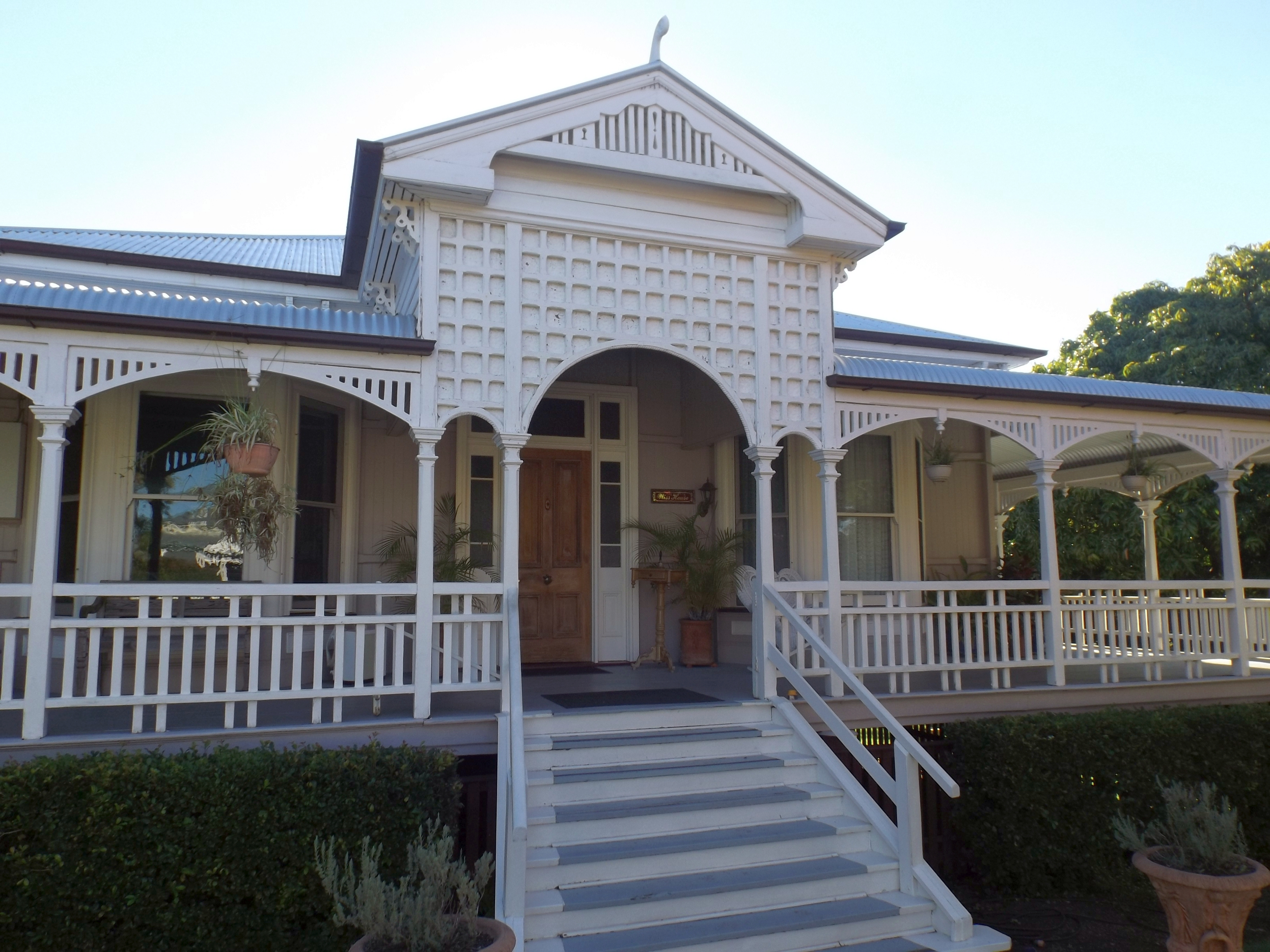
Front verandah and stairs, 2015

This single-skin timber house with chamferboard clad rear wing sits on a northwest sloping corner site and has a corrugated iron hipped roof with two projecting gables above the east entry porch and to the north. The building is almost square in plan with verandahs to three sides and a kitchen wing extending to the southwest. The building sits on timber stumps with timber batten infill.

The building is embellished by the use of decorative timber elements including eave brackets, bargeboards, batten gables, arch brackets, balustrade and tapering chamfered verandah posts. A large lattice spandrel panels to the triple arched entry porch has a pressed metal sheet backing with the arches having a rope pattern pressed metal edge.

The east elevation is symmetrical, having a central entry with sidelights and fanlight and two bays with sash windows. The north elevation has a large bay below the projecting gable and the verandahs to the kitchen wing have been enclosed. French doors with fanlights open onto the verandahs, the walls of which are single skin VJ boards. A corrugated iron stove recess is located on the western end of the kitchen wing and window hoods are located on the south.

Internally, the building has single skin VJ pine walls, cedar joinery and pressed metal and boarded ceilings. Some of the rooms, including the hallway, are unpainted hoop pine. The plan consists of a central hall with four bedrooms at the front and the drawing room and dining room towards the rear. The drawing room on the northern elevation, designed to overlook the town to the northwest, has a large bay window which is expressed as a gable in the roof.

The grounds include a fenced in-ground concrete pool to the northwest and mature trees to the northern boundary.

== Heritage listing ==
Wiss House (former) was listed on the Queensland Heritage Register on 26 August 1993 having satisfied the following criteria.

The place is important in demonstrating the evolution or pattern of Queensland's history.

The former Wiss House is important in demonstrating part of the pattern of Queensland's history, illustrating the residential expansion of Engelsburg (Kalbar) in the 1910s, and the economic growth of both the town and the Fassifern district in this period.

The place is important in demonstrating the principal characteristics of a particular class of cultural places.

The former Wiss House is important in demonstrating the principal characteristics of a substantial, largely intact, finely detailed and constructed residence of the late federation era, situated in a small country town.

The place is important because of its aesthetic significance.

The former Wiss House is important in exhibiting a range of aesthetic characteristics valued by the local community, including the building's siting and its contribution through scale, form and materials, to the townscape of Kalbar and its rural setting, the quality of the building's timber work and pressed metal details and the quality of the building's interior layout and detailing, including the relationship of the principal room to the view of the town centre and beyond, and unpainted pine walls and cedar joinery.

The place has a strong or special association with a particular community or cultural group for social, cultural or spiritual reasons.

The former Wiss House has a strong and special association with the Kalbar community, contributing to the identity of Kalbar through its physical presence and location, and as the residence of one of Kalbar's most prominent citizens of the late 19th and early 20th centuries.

The place has a special association with the life or work of a particular person, group or organisation of importance in Queensland's history.

The former Wiss House has a special association with Lionel Ainger Wiss and the Wiss family, who played an important role in the commercial, social and physical development of the Kalbar town, community and district from the 1890s to the 1940s.
