= Radford, Queensland =

Radford
- Suburb
- Interactive map of Radford
- Coordinates: 27.8502°S 152.6399°E
- Country: Australia
- State: Queensland
- LGA: Scenic Rim Region
- Location: 24.3 km (15.1 mi) NNW of Boonah; 36.1 km (22.4 mi) SW of Ipswich CBD; 55.3 km (34.4 mi) NW of Beaudesert; 74.3 km (46.2 mi) SW of Brisbane CBD

Government
  - State electorate: Scenic Rim
  - Federal division: Wright

Area
  - Total: 7.3 km^{2} (2.8 sq mi)

Population
  - Total: 31 (2021 census)
  - Density: 4.25/km^{2} (11.00/sq mi)
- Time zone: UTC+10:00 (AEST)
- Postcode: 4307
Suburbs around Radford
Warrill View	Warrill View	Wilsons Plains
Warrill View	Radford	Wilsons Plains
Silverdale	Silverdale	Munbilla

Radford is a rural locality in the Scenic Rim Region, Queensland, Australia. In the 2021 census, Radford had a population of 31 people.

== Geography ==
Warrill Creek forms the western and south-western boundaries.

== History ==
The Fassifern railway line (Queensland's first branch railway line) opened from Ipswich to Harrisville on 10 July 1882. On 12 September 1887 the line was extended to Dugundan with Radford being served by Radford railway station on Radford Road (27.8541°S 152.6437°E). The line closed in 1964.

The locality takes its name from the railway station, which was named after the town of Radford in Nottinghamshire, England.

Radford State School opened on 3 April 1933 and closed in 1946. It was on Radford Road (approx 27.8543°S 152.6407°E).

== Demographics ==
In the 2016 census, Radford had a population of 41 people. The locality contained 15 households, in which 46.9% of the population was males and 53.1% of the population was females with a median age of 50, 12 years above the national average. The average weekly household income is $1,624, $186 above the national average.

In the 2021 census, Radford had a population of 31 people.

== Education ==
There are no schools in Radford. The nearest government primary schools are Warrill View State School in neighbouring Warrill View to the north-west and Harrisville State School in Harrisville to the north-east. The nearest government secondary school is Boonah State High School in Boonah to the south.
