= Wiss Brothers Store =

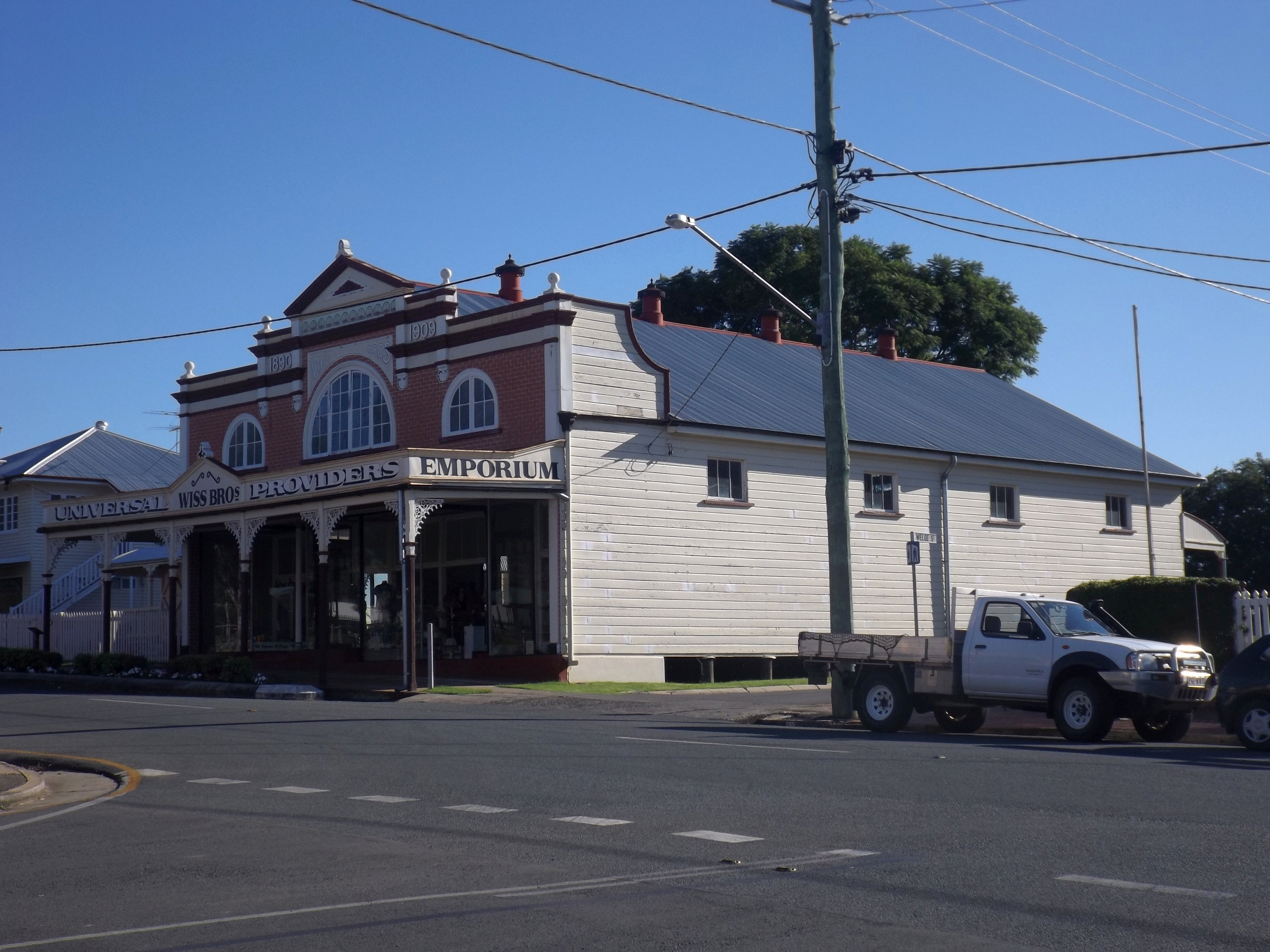
- Store in 2015

- Location within Queensland Location within Australia
- 27.9387°S 152.6236°E
- Location: 101 George Street, Kalbar, Queensland, Australia

History
- Design period: 1870s - 1890s (late 19th century)
- Built: 1890 - 1909

Queensland Heritage Register
- Official name: Wiss Brothers Store & Dwelling (former)
- Type: state heritage (built)
- Designated: 29 October 1992
- Reference no.: 601200
- Significant period: 1890s, 1900s (fabric); 1909-1966 (historical use as general store)
- Significant components: store/s / storeroom / storehouse, shop/s, residential accommodation - housing

Wiss Brothers Store is a heritage-listed shopping centre at 101 George Street, Kalbar, Queensland, Australia. It was built from 1890 to 1909. It was added to the Queensland Heritage Register on 29 October 1992. The building now houses The Emporium shopping experience, an extension of Empire Revival in Brisbane.

== History ==
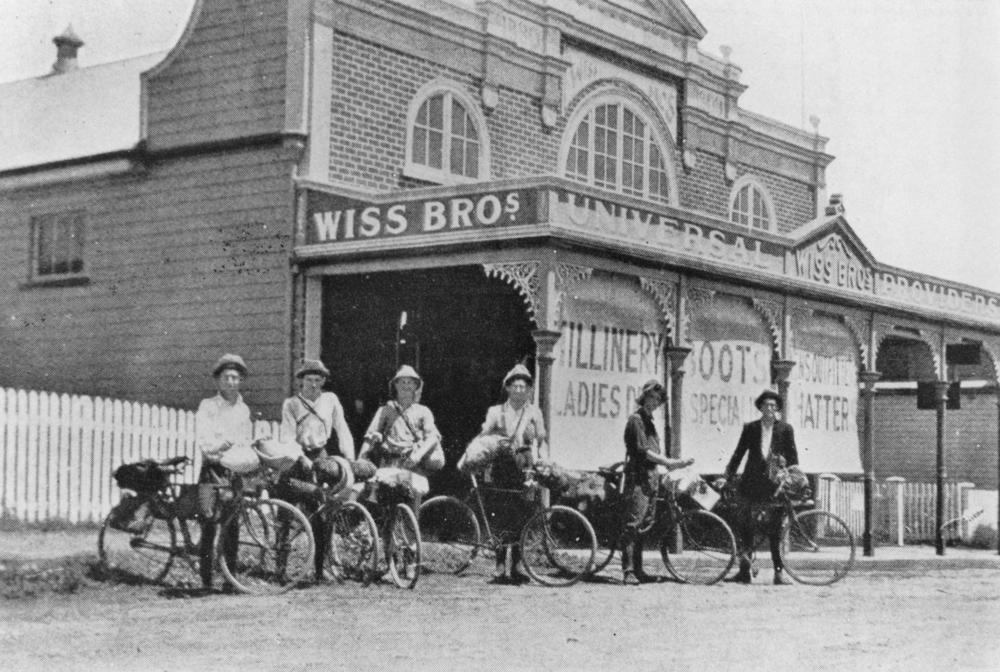
Wiss Brothers Store, 1921

This large timber store was erected in 1909 for Lionel Ainger Wiss of Wiss Bros, a prominent Engelsburg (Kalbar) general store and trading firm. It replaced a smaller store built in 1890.

LA Wiss had arrived in Queensland from Germany with his brothers Campbell and Alfred, c.1887. They were German-born sons of English parents. After a short time in northern Queensland, Alfred returned to England and Lionel and Campbell moved to Ipswich, where they worked for grocer W Siemon & Sons for about three years.

In mid-1890 the brothers acquired an acre of land at Engelsburg, in the heart of the Fassifern Scrub district, south of Ipswich, which had been settled in the 1870s by immigrant German farmers. At this time, the township of Engelsburg comprised a general store, two saddlers, a cabinetmaker and glazier, a hotel and store, a butcher's shop, timber yard and blacksmith. The Engelsburg State School had been established in 1885. There were two Lutheran churches in the district, a Baptist church, a Primitive Methodist church, a Catholic church, and a small Salvation Army meeting hall. Much of the brigalow scrub had been cleared, and the surrounding district was dotted with small farm selections of 60, 80 or 120 acres.

On their Engelsburg property, adjacent to Heinrich Welge's Fassifern Hotel on the principal road from Ipswich to the Fassifern head station, the Wiss brothers erected a small store and dwelling. In August 1890, Ipswich architect Henry Edmund Wyman called tenders for a store and dwelling to be erected at Engelsburg, and by September 1890, a store for Lionel Wiss was being constructed there.

Lionel married Danish immigrant Maria Elise Wiuff at Ipswich in late 1890, and in the same year joined Campbell in partnership as Wiss Bros, storekeepers, at Engelsburg. They established one of the most important businesses in the town, which was emerging as a district centre following the closer settlement of the Fassifern Scrub for dairying and agriculture. They provided a general store which not only sold a great variety of goods, but also traded farm produce, acted as agent for major farm equipment suppliers, and offered substantial credit, doing much to assist local farmers. As early as 1892, Wiss Bros were the local agents for the United, Fire and Marine Insurance Co., and from 1894 to 1897 held the Engelsburg postal receiving office, until construction of an official post office in 1897. Until the railway came to Kalbar in 1916, Wiss Bros transported local produce to the nearest railhead at Munbilla on behalf of the local farmers. The firm was a principal employer in the town, with 8 to 10 employees by the 1920s.

In 1903, their premises consisted of the small store and a separate dwelling fronting George Street, and bulk store and large stables at the rear. Lionel Wiss's property had been extended with the acquisition of an adjacent acre to the south in 1898, and a further adjoining 2 roods in 1901. Campbell Wiss had left the partnership by c.1904, but the name Wiss Bros was retained.

When the new store was erected in 1909, the original store was moved a little to the north in George Street, and operated for many years as Surawski's Fassifern Cafe. In the 1980s this building was shifted to the Cunningham Highway.

Lionel ('Daddy') Wiss was a highly respected local identity, who took a prominent role in the community and the local Methodist church. In 1910, he acquired 56 acres in the centre of Engelsburg. About half of this he subdivided in 1916 into residential allotments, thereby creating most of the western half of the town of Engelsburg (renamed Kalbar in 1916 when the railway reached the town).

Following Lionel Wiss's death in 1932, the business was managed by his family under the supervision of his daughter Adeline Wiss. In 1947 the business was sold to Holmes Bros, and remained a general store until 1966, when transferred to Chemical & Air Services Pty Ltd, who occupied the buildings for over twenty years.

== Description ==
This store is located on a corner site fronting George Street, the main street of Kalbar. The rectangular chamferboard building, sits on timber stumps, and has a corrugated iron gabled roof with a skillion awning over the footpath. Four decorative metal ventilators are located along the ridge of the roof.

The street facade is a virtuoso assemblage of sheet metal in imitation of classical masonry detail. It has three arched windows above the awning, the central one being the largest and crowned by a pediment with the inscription WISS BROS. Pilasters feature to either side of the pediment, with the dates 1890 and 1909, and to the corners of the facade, and are surmounted by finials.

The building is embellished by the use of decorative pressed metal sheets, depicting a brickwork pattern to the front facade and floral and geometric patterns to the verandah awning, window display ceiling and sections of the store ceiling. The shopfront has three glass display bays with cast-iron columns at each corner of the central bay. There are French doors with fanlights, between each of the bays.

The building has high level, centrally pivoting hopper windows to both sides and rear. The rear has a corrugated iron skillion roofed verandah with two entry doors and sash windows.

Internally, the building has exposed timber trusses with diagonally boarded raked ceilings with a central flat pressed metal ceiling. The trusses are supported by central timber columns with timber arch brackets and some of the original timber partitioning, with turned timber balustrade capping, remains.

To the south of the store is the original residence, consisting of two small timber and iron dwellings connected by an enclosed verandah. A bulk store, constructed of timber with twin hipped corrugated iron roofs and lean-to awnings, is located at the rear of the store.

== Heritage listing ==
Wiss Brothers Store & Dwelling (former) was listed on the Queensland Heritage Register on 29 October 1992 having satisfied the following criteria.

The place is important in demonstrating the evolution or pattern of Queensland's history.

The former Wiss Bros Store and Dwelling is important in demonstrating part of the pattern of Queensland's history, illustrating the growth of Engelsburg (Kalbar) as the centre of a thriving dairying and agricultural district in the early years of the 20th century.

The place is important in demonstrating the principal characteristics of a particular class of cultural places.

The former Wiss Bros Store and Dwelling is important in demonstrating the principal characteristics of an intact, early 20th century general purpose country store, with associated early bulk store and c.1890 dwelling.

The place is important because of its aesthetic significance.

The former Wiss Bros Store and Dwelling is important in exhibiting a range of aesthetic characteristics valued by the local community, being a self-conscious element in the townscape, employing lavish and accomplished workmanship in sheet and pressed metal to imitate a classical masonry facade.

The place has a special association with the life or work of a particular person, group or organisation of importance in Queensland's history.

The former Wiss Bros Store and Dwelling has a special association with Engelsburg (Kalbar) storekeeper Lionel Ainger Wiss and the firm of Wiss Bros, who played an important role in the commercial, social and physical development of the Kalbar town, community and district from the 1890s to the 1940s.
