= Kents Lagoon, Queensland =

Kents Lagoon
- Suburb
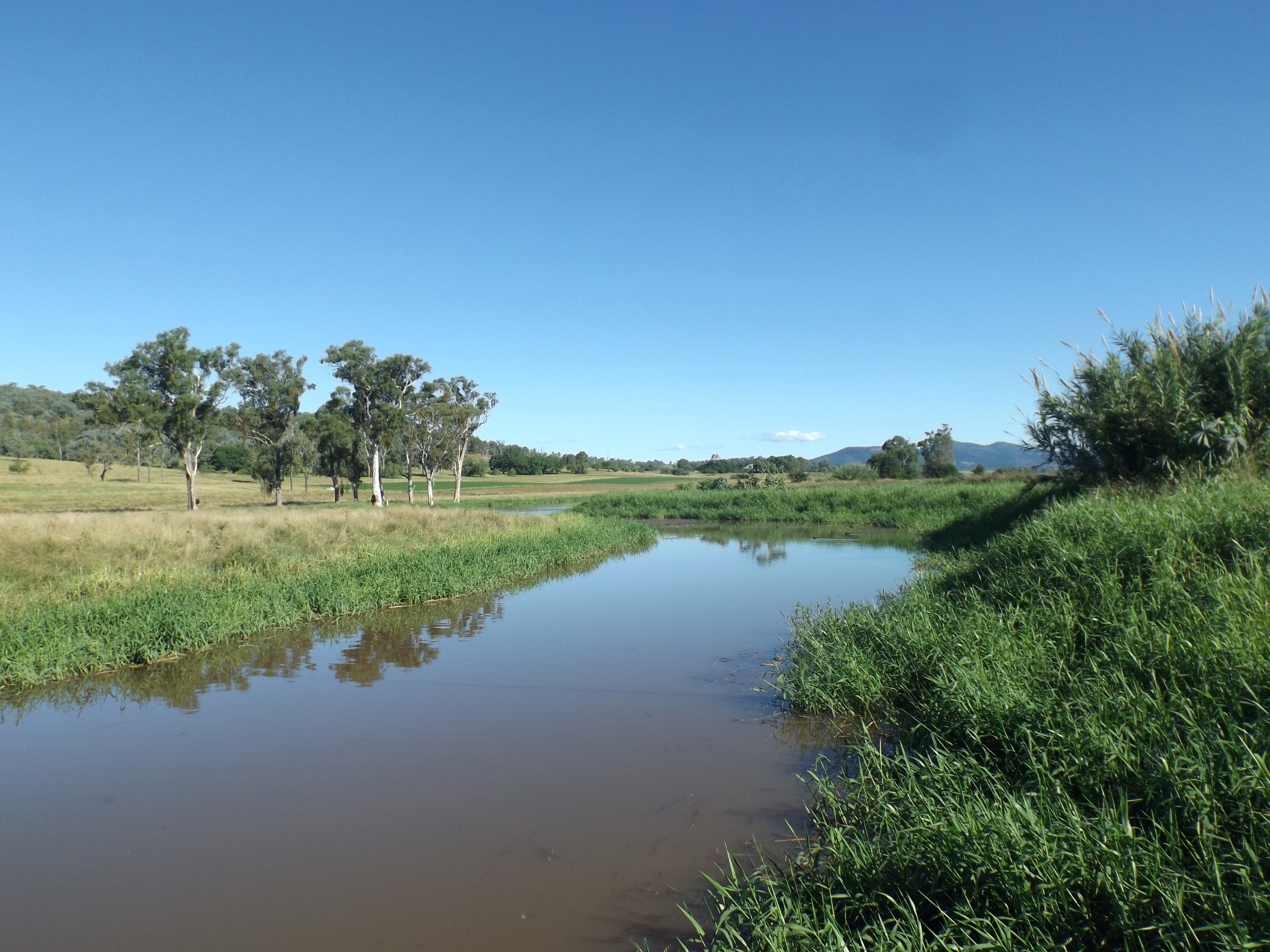
- Kents Lagoon, 2015

- Interactive map of Kents Lagoon
- Coordinates: 27.8986°S 152.6233°E
- Country: Australia
- State: Queensland
- LGA: Scenic Rim Region
- Location: 14.9 km (9.3 mi) NW of Boonah; 39.2 km (24.4 mi) SSW of Ipswich; 47.9 km (29.8 mi) WNW of Beaudesert; 78.3 km (48.7 mi) SW of Brisbane CBD

Government
  - State electorate: Scenic Rim
  - Federal division: Wright

Area
  - Total: 9.8 km^{2} (3.8 sq mi)

Population
  - Total: 60 (2021 census)
  - Density: 6.1/km^{2} (15.9/sq mi)
- Time zone: UTC+10:00 (AEST)
- Postcode: 4309
Suburbs around Kents Lagoon
| Silverdale | Munbilla | Munbilla |
| Silverdale | Kents Lagoon | Munbilla |
| Kalbar | Kalbar | Obum Obum |

Kents Lagoon is a rural locality in the Scenic Rim Region, Queensland, Australia. In the 2021 census, Kents Lagoon had a population of 60 people.

== Geography ==
Warrill Creek marks the western boundary of the locality.

Kents Lagoon is a waterhole (27.8869°S 152.6302°E) and presumably the origin of the name of the locality. The lagoon may have been named after journalist John Kent (1809-1862) who was the editor of The North Australian newspaper, published in Ipswich. The lagoon is long but thin, extending from the north of the locality to the south.

Obum Obum Hill is in the east of the locality (27.9077°S 152.6386°E), rising 153 metres (502 ft) above sea level.

The land use is predominantly irrigated crop-growing in the west of the locality, with grazing on native vegetation in the east of the locality.

== History ==
The lagoon was named by Ludwig Leichhardt after F. Kent, the then owner of Fassifern station.

Irrigated farms of 124 to 234 acres (50 to 95 ha) first went to auction in January 1906 as part of the Kent's Lagoon Paddock Estate. The estate was bounded by Warrill Creek to the west, the now closed Mundbilla railway station to the north-east, and Main Road (now Munbilla Road) to the east.

The Mount Edwards railway line opened in 1922 and closed in 1960. The locality was served by the Waraperta railway station (27.90333°S 152.63278°E) on Munbilla Road. It was named by the Queensland Railways Department on 28 November 1914 Waraperta is an Aboriginal word meaning tommahawk.

In 1981, Barton's Rose Farm opened on a 5-hectare (12-acre) site at 541 Kents Lagoon Road (27.8888°S 152.6217°E). It was a farm that grew and sold roses and rose bushes. It closed on 16 June 1921.

== Demographics ==
In the 2016 census, Kents Lagoon had a population of 56 people. The locality contained 24 households, in which 51.6% of the population were males and 48.4% of the population were females with a median age of 38, the same as the national average. The average weekly household income was $1,624, $186 above the national average.

In the 2021 census, Kents Lagoon had a population of 60 people.

== Education ==
There are no schools in Kents Lagoon. The nearest government primary schools are Kalbar State School in neighbouring Kalbar to the south and Warrill View State School in Warrill View to the north-west. The nearest government secondary school is Boonah State High School in Boonah to the south-east.
