= Munbilla, Queensland =

Munbilla
- Town
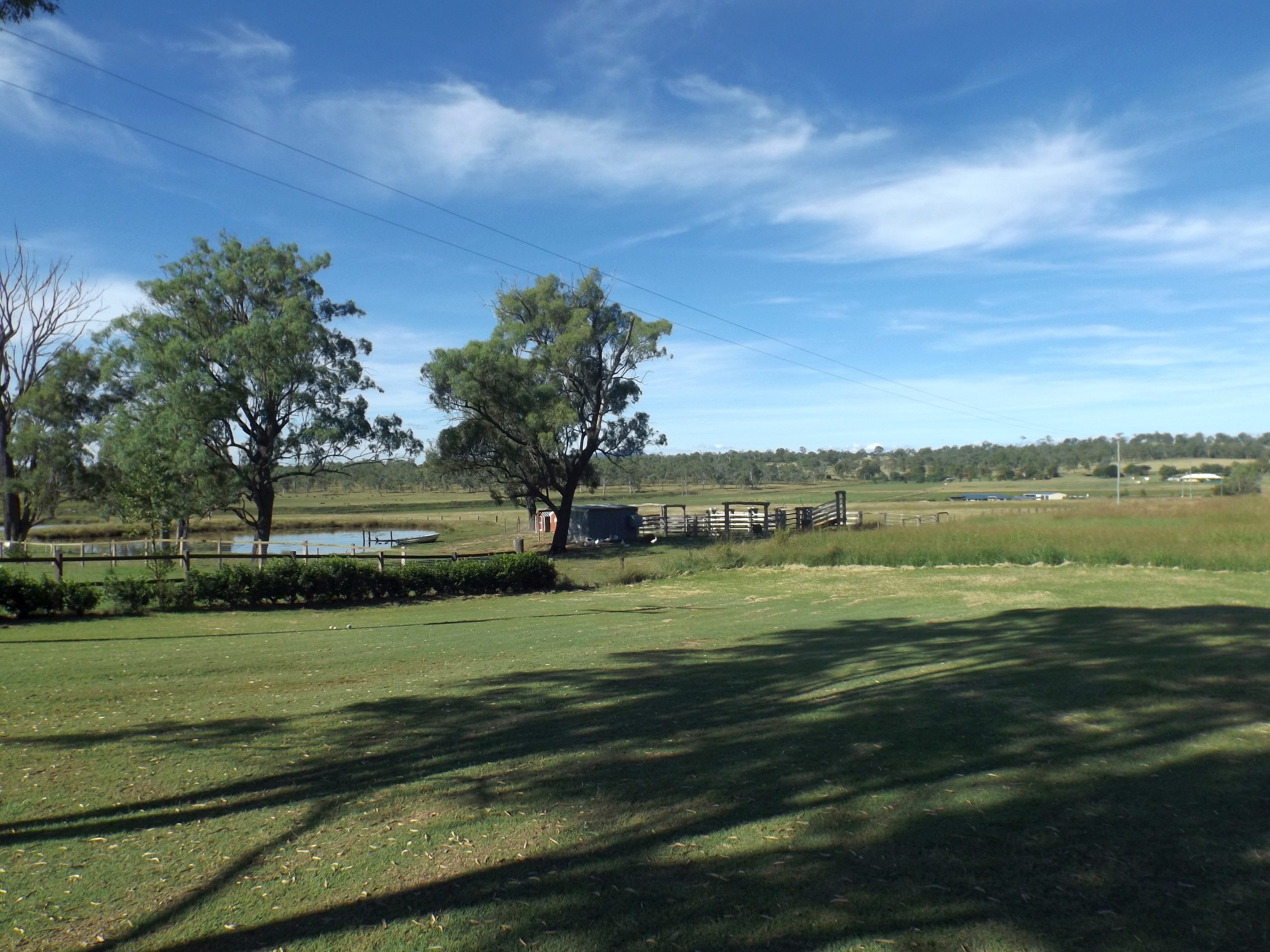
- Farm on Kengoon Road, 2015

- Interactive map of Munbilla
- Coordinates: 27.8752°S 152.6597°E
- Country: Australia
- State: Queensland
- LGA: Scenic Rim Region
- Location: 8.6 km (5.3 mi) S of Harrisville; 19.4 km (12.1 mi) N of Boonah; 34.7 km (21.6 mi) SSW of Ipswich; 73.8 km (45.9 mi) SW of Brisbane

Government
  - State electorate: Scenic Rim
  - Federal division: Wright

Area
  - Total: 11.4 km^{2} (4.4 sq mi)

Population
  - Total: 93 (2021 census)
  - Density: 8.16/km^{2} (21.13/sq mi)
- Time zone: UTC+10:00 (AEST)
- Postcode: 4309
Localities around Munbilla
Radford	Radford	Milora
Silverdale	Munbilla	Anthony
Kents Lagoon	Obum Obum	Blantyre

Munbilla is a rural town and locality in the Scenic Rim Region, Queensland, Australia. In the 2021 census, the locality of Munbilla had a population of 93 people.

== Geography ==
Warrill Creek forms the north-western boundary of the locality. The town is in the north-east of the locality.

Mooroo Ougee Lagoon is a perennial waterhole in the north of the locality (27.8669°S 152.6475°E).

== History ==
The suburb takes its name from the former Munbilla railway station, whose name was created in 1886 by the Queensland Railways Department using the Yuggera words mun (meaning much) and billa (meaning water) to mean a large lagoon.

The Fassifern railway line (Queensland's first branch railway line) opened from Ipswich to Harrisville on 10 July 1882. On 12 September 1887 the line was extended to Dugundan with Munbilla being served by Munbilla railway station on Macfarlane Road (27.8711°S 152.6561°E). The line closed in June 1964.

The Mount Edwards branch line branched off from the Fassifern line immediately south of the Munbilla railway station (27.8714°S 152.6563°E). The Mount Edwards line opened to Kalbar on 17 April 1916 and to Mount Edwards on 7 October 1922. The Mount Edwards line closed in 1960.

== Demographics ==
In the 2011 census, the locality of Munbukka and surrounds had a population of 434 people.

In the 2016 census, the locality of Munbilla had a population of 100 people.

In the 2021 census, the locality of Munbilla had a population of 93 people.

== Education ==
There are no schools in Munbilla. The nearest government primary schools are:

- Harrisville State School in Harrisville to the north
- Roadvale State School in Roadvale to the south-east
- Kalbar State School in Kalbar to the south
- Warrill View State School in Warrill View to the north-west

The nearest government secondary school is Boonah State High School in Boonah to the south.
