= Kalbar, Queensland =

Kalbar
- Town
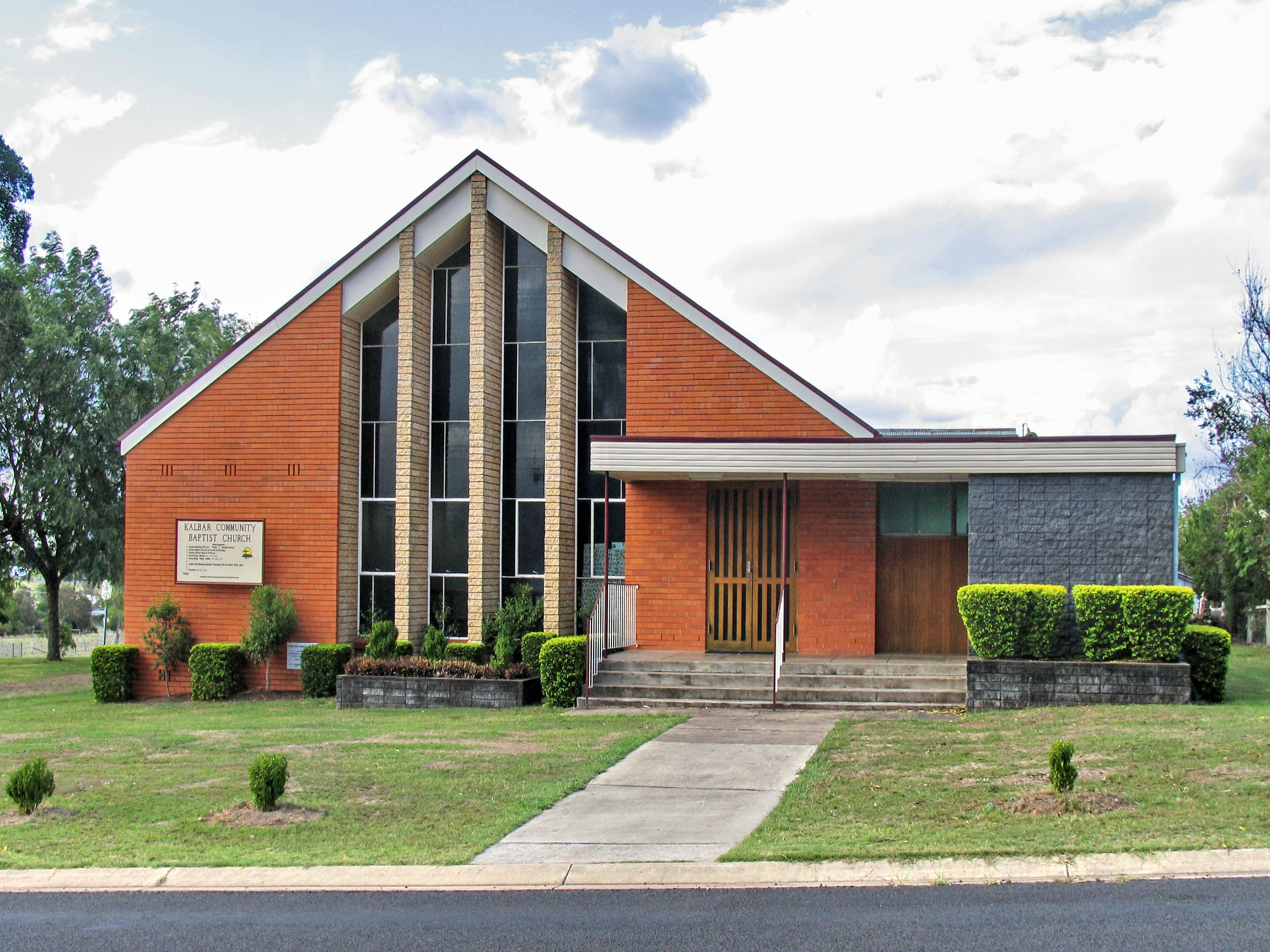
- Kalbar Community Baptist Church

- Interactive map of Kalbar
- Coordinates: 27.9419°S 152.6233°E
- Country: Australia
- State: Queensland
- LGA: Scenic Rim Region
- Location: 11.0 km (6.8 mi) NW of Boonah; 43.2 km (26.8 mi) SSW of Ipswich; 43.7 km (27.2 mi) W of Beaudesert; 81.8 km (50.8 mi) SW of Brisbane CBD
- Established: 1876

Government
  - State electorate: Scenic Rim
  - Federal division: Wright

Area
  - Total: 31.7 km^{2} (12.2 sq mi)

Population
  - Total: 1,246 (2021 census)
  - Density: 39.31/km^{2} (101.80/sq mi)
- Time zone: UTC+10:00 (AEST)
- Postcode: 4309
Localities around Kalbar
Silverdale	Kents Lagoon	Obum Obum
Frazerview	Kalbar	Teviotville
Fassifern	Fassifern Valley	Templin

Kalbar, formerly known as Fassifern Scrub and later Engelsburg (German: [ˈɛŋl̩sˌbɛʁk] ENG-uls-bairk) or Engelsberg ([ˈɛŋl̩sˌbʊʁk] ENG-uls-boork), is a rural town and locality in the Scenic Rim Region, Queensland, Australia. In the 2021 census, the locality of Kalbar had a population of 1,246 people.

In 1916 during World War I, Engelsburg was renamed Kalbar due to anti-German sentiment.

== Geography ==
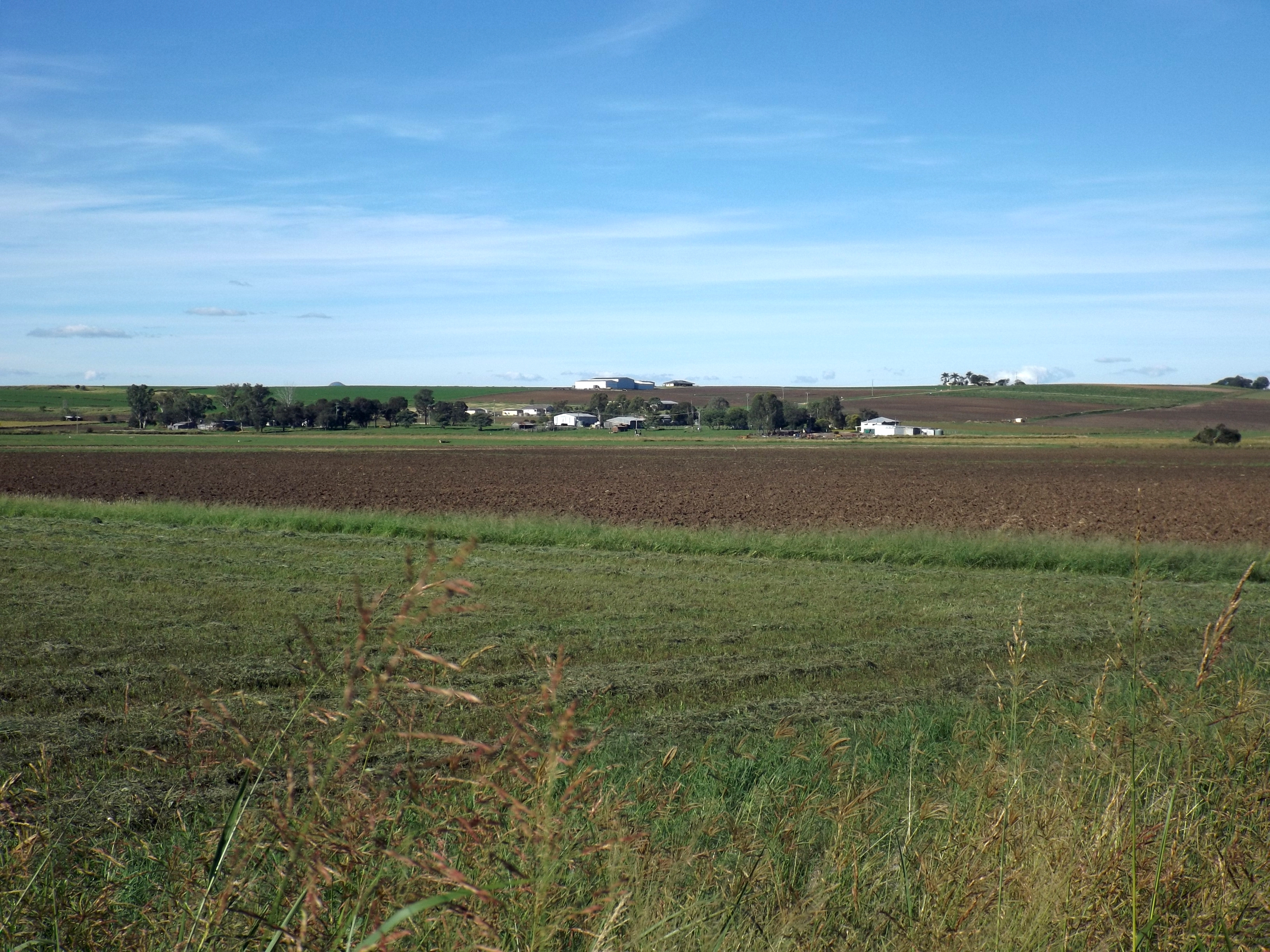
Farms close to Warrill Creek, 2015

Kalbar is in the Scenic Rim in South East Queensland, 81.8 km south-west of Brisbane. It is located near the Cunningham Highway and directly north of Mount French in the Fassifern Valley.

== History ==
In 1877, 17,700 acres (7,200 ha) were resumed from the Fassifern pastoral run and offered for selection on 19 April 1877. By 1890, a small town had developed. The town was once known as Fassifern Scrub and then Engelsburg after an early settler, storekeeper August Engels. The town has a very rich German history, having been established "almost exclusively" by German settlers, reflected today in the many Anglo-German road and street names as well as the many local German settler descendant surnames.

Fassifern Scrub Provisional School opened on 3 February 1879. On 4 September 1879, it was renamed Engelsburg State School. Having previously operated in the Baptist Church, the school moved to 25-27 Edward Street (now Engels Memorial Park, 27.9405°S 152.6354°E) on 28 September 1885. On 24 January 1955, the school relocated to the Kalbar School of Arts while modern school buildings were being constructed in a new site on George Street. On 24 June 1955, the school moved into the new George Street buildings. On 19 April 1958, an official opening of new school site in George Street was held. On 27 August 1979, the school was renamed Kalbar State School (it had not been possible to rename the school during World War I because there was another Kalbar State School in South Kolan which operated until 1962). In 2007, some of the school buildings were invaded by a colony of microbats which lived in the walls and roofs and constituted a health hazard to staff and students as the bats can transmit Australian bat lyssavirus. The staff and students in the affected buildings were relocated into demountable buildings and the bat-infested buildings were demolished. A "bat haven" was established on the school grounds to provide an alternative home for the bat colony (being a protected species). New bat-proof buildings were opened in July 2010. Over the years, the school expanded to accommodate students from a number of other small local schools which were closed, including Fassifern Station School (1888), Obum Obum State School (1946), Fassifern Valley State School (1958), Charlwood State School (1958), Moogerah Dam State School (1961), Silverdale State School (1963), and Frazerview State School (1975).

Engelsburg Post Office opened on 7 July 1897 (a receiving office had been open from 1878 and was known as Engels for five years). It was renamed Kalbar Post Office in 1916.

During the 1899 referendum to decide if Australia should become a federation, Kalbar registered the highest No vote of any town in Queensland.

On Sunday 5 July 1908 the new Engelsburg Primitive Methodist Church was officially opened. It was the Primitive Methodist church building originally built at Dugandan in 1883 and subsequently relocated to Boonah to avoid flooding. Following the opening of a new Methodist Church in Boonah in 1907, the church building was relocated to Engelsburg where it was extensively renovated.

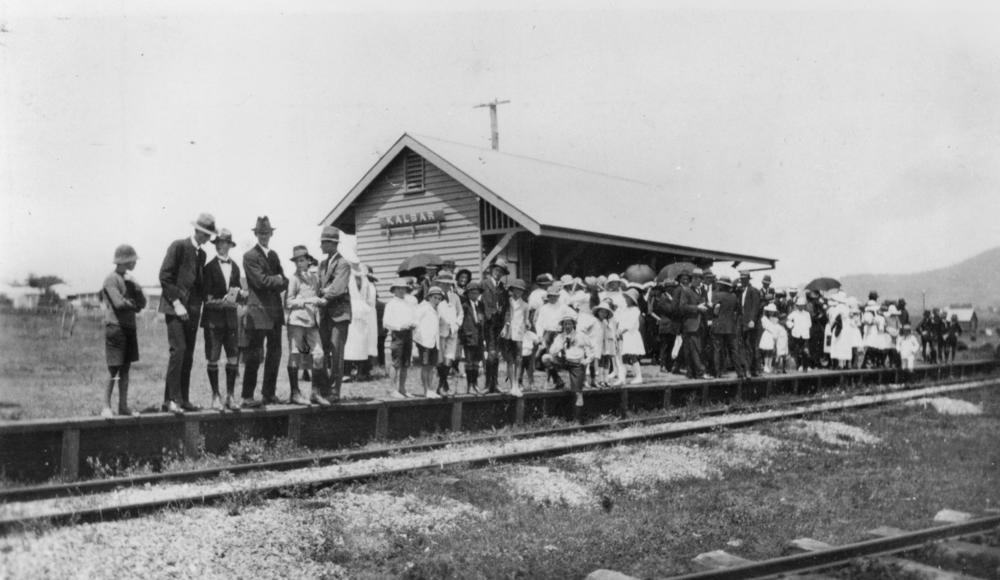
Passengers waiting at Kalbar railway station on the Mount Edwards railway line, 1917

The first stage of the Mount Edwards railway line reached the town on 17 April 1916, with the town being served by the Kalbar railway station at the western end of Railway Street (27.93924°S 152.62090°E). On 7 October 1922, the second and final stage of the line was completed, including Warumkarie railway station on Warumkarie Road in the south of the Kalbar locality (27.95715°S 152.61082°E). The Mount Edwards railway line closed in 1960.

The name changed to Kalbar because of anti-German sentiment in 1916 during World War I. Initially it only applied to the railway station. The Engelsberg School of Arts did not change to the Kalbar School of Arts until July 1918.

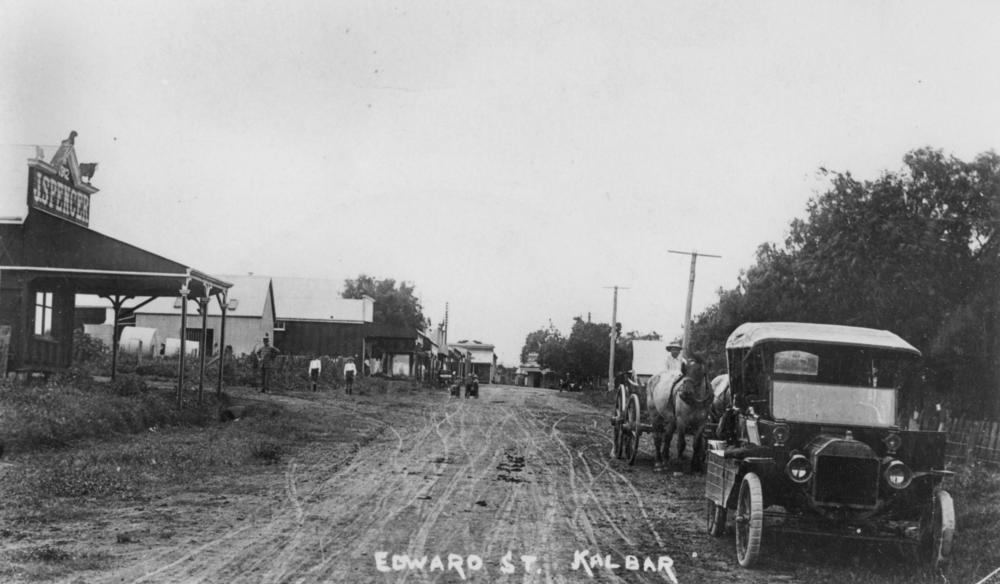
Edward Street in the 1920s

In 1920, the Kalbar School of Arts hall and half the businesses in town were destroyed by fire.

St Boniface Catholic Church was built in 1888 adjacent to the Catholic cemetery. It closed in 1925. On 20 October 1946, St Boniface Catholic Church was rebuilt on the corner of George and William Streets from the materials taken from the old church. It was dedicated by Monsignor J English and Monsignor M Balwin. It was adjacent to the Catholic cemetery. The church closed in 1978 and in 1987 it was sold to the Assemblies of God (now the Australian Christian Churches). The building is now used by one of its affiliated congregation, the Fassifern Christian Church.

From 1961 to 1990, Kalbar held a large annual celebration, the Fassifern Potato Festival. The event included a street parade with motorised floats culminating at the show grounds and continuation of festivities. Some artifacts from the festival can be found at the Templin Historical Village. Harvest Festivals organised by the local Salvation Army church extended back to the 1920s.

== Demographics ==
In the 2016 census, the locality of Kalbar had a population of 1,093 people. The locality contains 453 households, in which 47.8% of the population are males and 52.2% of the population are females with a median age of 41, 3 years above the national average. The average weekly household income is $1,133, $305 below the national average. 4.8% of Kalbar's population is either of Aborigional or Torres Strait Islander descent. 57.3% of the population aged 15 or over is either registered or de facto married, while 42.7% of the population is not married. 28.7% of the population is currently attending some form of a compulsory education. The most common nominated ancestries were Australian (28.6%), English (27.8%) and German (13.4%), while the most common country of birth was Australia (83.0%), and the most commonly spoken language at home was English (90.9%). The most common nominated religions were No religion (23.7%), Catholic (15.0%) and Anglican (14.3%). The most common occupation was a labourer (19.4%) and the majority/plurality of residents worked 40 or more hours per week (40.9%).

In the 2021 census, the locality of Kalbar had a population of 1,246 people.

== Heritage listings ==
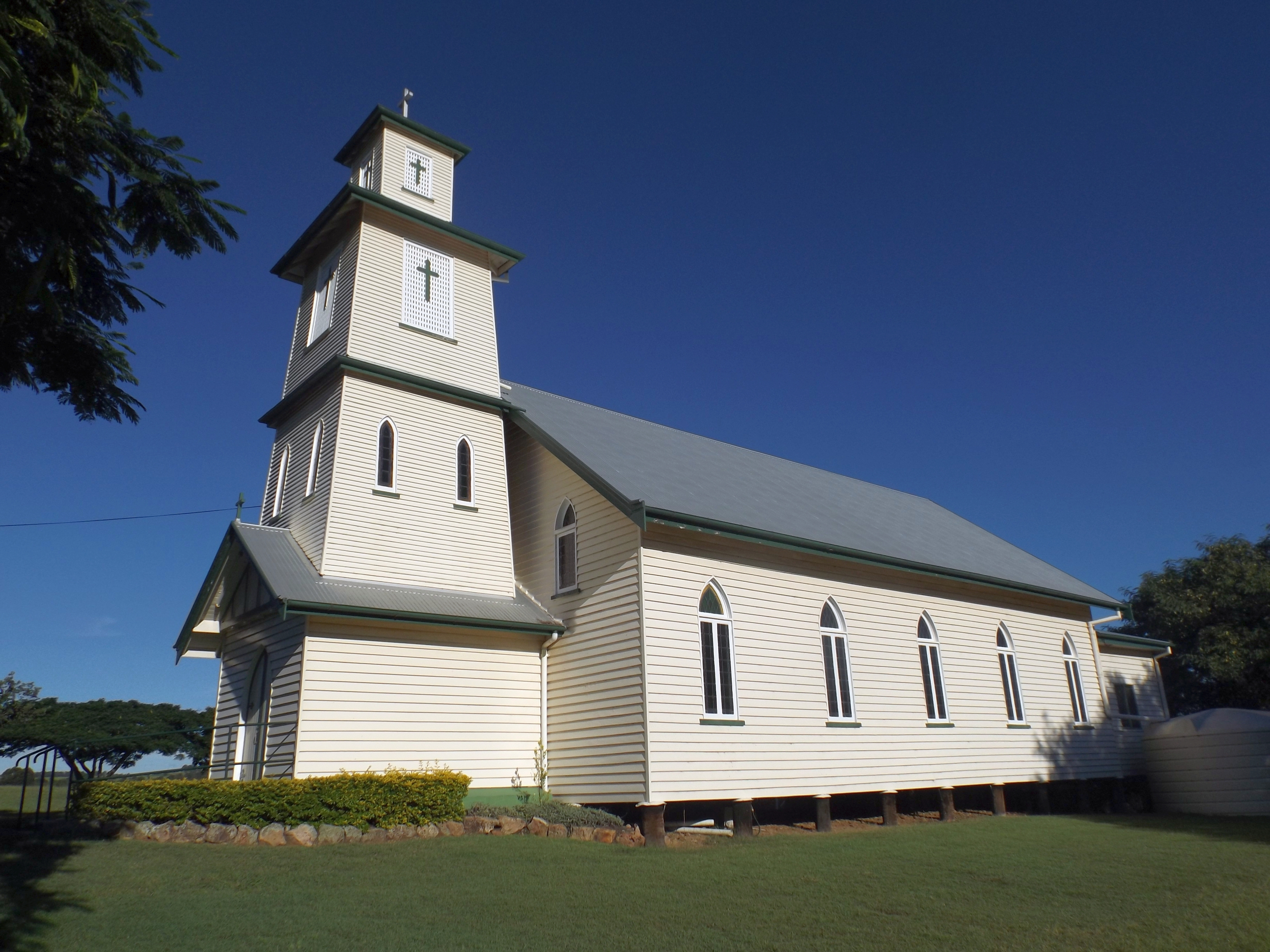
St John’s Lutheran Church, 2015

Kalbar has a number of heritage-listed sites, including:

- Wiss House, 7 Ann Street (27.9409°S 152.6249°E)
- Fassifern Homestead, 1008B Boonah-Fassifern Road (27.9596°S 152.5967°E)
- School of Arts and Memorial Hall, 63-65 Edward Street (27.9387°S 152.6253°E)
- Wiss Brothers Store, 101 George Street (27.9386°S 152.6237°E)
- St John’s Lutheran Church, Teviotville Road (27.9423°S 152.6492°E)

== Education ==
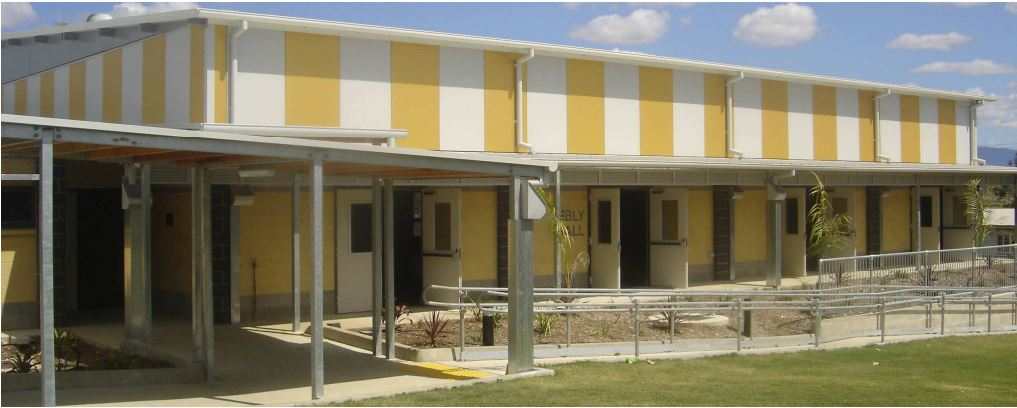
Assembly hall, Kalbar State School, 2024

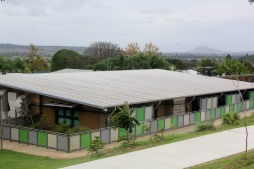
School library, Kalbar State School, 2024

Kalbar State School is a government primary (Prep-6) school for boys and girls on George Street (27.94284°S 152.62333°E). In 2017, the school had an enrolment of 202 students with 21 teachers (15 full-time equivalent) and 14 non-teaching staff (8 full-time equivalent) and included a special education program. In 2022, the school had an enrolment of 252 students with 19 teachers (15 full-time equivalent) and 14 non-teaching staff (8 full-time equivalent).

There is no secondary school in Kalbar. The nearest government secondary school is Boonah State High School in Boonah to the south-east.

== Amenities ==
The Scenic Rim Regional Council operates a mobile library service which visits George Street.

Fassifern Christian Church is on the north-east corner of George Street and William Street (27.9407°S 152.6238°E). It is affiliated with the Australian Christian Churches.

The Fassifern Corp of the Salvation Army in Australia is at 74 George Street (27.9397°S 152.6241°E).

== Events ==
The annual agricultural show is held in June.

Kalbar Country Day is a festival which is held in late October annually since 1991.

Light Up Kalbar is a community street festival held in early December to bring the community together as they light the town's Christmas tree.

== Notable residents ==
- John Bradfield commenced his schooling in Engelsberg
