= Teviotville, Queensland =

Teviotville
- Town
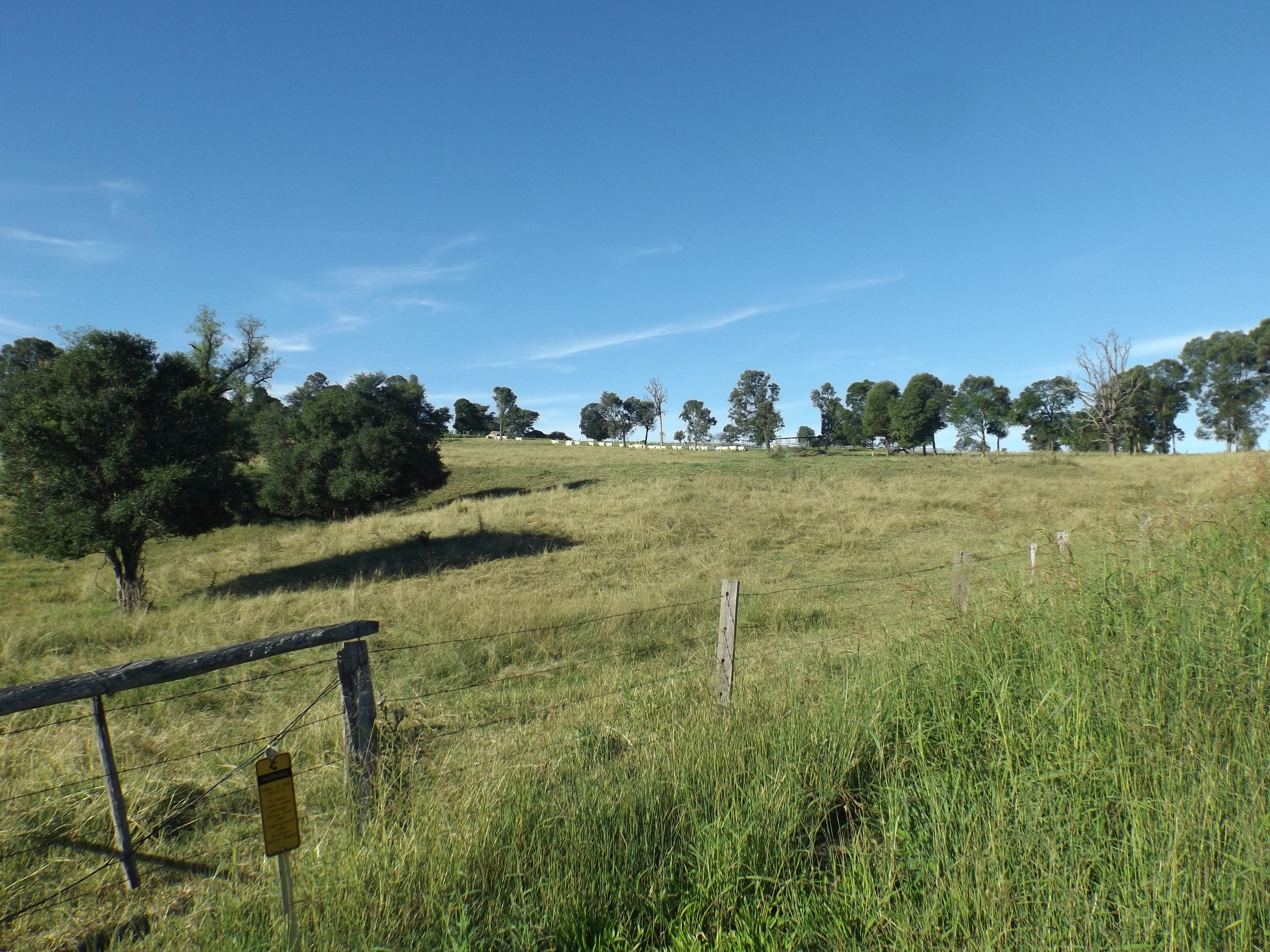
- Farm along Teviotville Road, 2015

- Interactive map of Teviotville
- Coordinates: 27.9488°S 152.6780°E
- Country: Australia
- State: Queensland
- LGA: Scenic Rim Region
- Location: 7.3 km (4.5 mi) N of Boonah; 37.8 km (23.5 mi) W of Beaudesert; 42.8 km (26.6 mi) S of Ipswich; 82.0 km (51.0 mi) SW of Brisbane

Government
  - State electorate: Scenic Rim
  - Federal division: Wright

Area
  - Total: 9.1 km^{2} (3.5 sq mi)

Population
  - Total: 114 (2021 census)
  - Density: 12.53/km^{2} (32.4/sq mi)
- Time zone: UTC+10:00 (AEST)
- Postcode: 4309
Localities around Teviotville
Obum Obum	Kulgun	Roadvale
Kalbar	Teviotville	Coulson
Templin	Hoya	Hoya

Teviotville is a rural locality in the Scenic Rim Region, Queensland, Australia. In the 2021 census, the locality of Teviotville had a population of 114 people.

== Geography ==
Teviotville is in the Scenic Rim of South East Queensland.

== History ==
The name Teviotville is derived from the name of its railway station, which was named by the Queensland Railway Department in 1887, which in turn was named after the major watercourse in the area, Teviot Brook. The brook in turn was named on 6 August 1828 by explorer Allan Cunningham after the River Teviot in Roxburghshire, Scotland.

The Fassifern railway line (Queensland's first branch railway line) opened from Ipswich to Harrisville on 10 July 1882. On 12 September 1887 the line was extended to Dugundan with Teviotville being served by Teviotville railway station on Stanfield Road near the junction with Teviotville (27.9472°S 152.6867°E). The line closed in June 1964.

Teviotville Railway Station Provisional School opened on 1 August 1899 with 25 students under teacher Miss M.J.A. Alcorn. In 1903 it was renamed Teviotville Provisional School. On 1 January 1909 it became Teviotville State School. A new school building was opened on 13 March 1914 by Ernest Thomas Bell, the Member of the Queensland Legislative Assembly for Fassifern. It was on the south-west corner of Hoya Road and Haag Road (27.9495°S 152.6850°E). It closed on 11 December 1981 due to low student numbers.

Cross of Christ Lutheran Church was built from timber in 1909. In 1969, it was relocated to Boonah to form a church with St Matthew's from Hoya.

St Therese of the Child Jesus Catholic Church was built in 1936 at a cost of £260. It was the 125th church opened by Duhig. It was later relocated to another part of the diocese.

== Demographics ==
In the 2011 census, Teviotville and surrounds had a population of 273 people.

In the 2016 census, Teviotville had a population of 125 people.

In the 2021 census, Teviotville had a population of 114 people.

== Education ==
There are no schools in Teviotville. The nearest government primary schools are Kalbar State School in neighbouring Kalbar to the west, Roadvale State School in neighbouring Roadvale to the north-east, and Boonah State School in Boonah to the south. The nearest government secondary school is Boonah State High School, also in Boonah. There is also a Catholic primary school in Boonah.

== In popular culture ==
The Teviotville Tree is located on private property in Teviotville. The tree was used in the filming of the 2010 film The Tree.
