= Templin, Queensland =

Templin
- Suburb
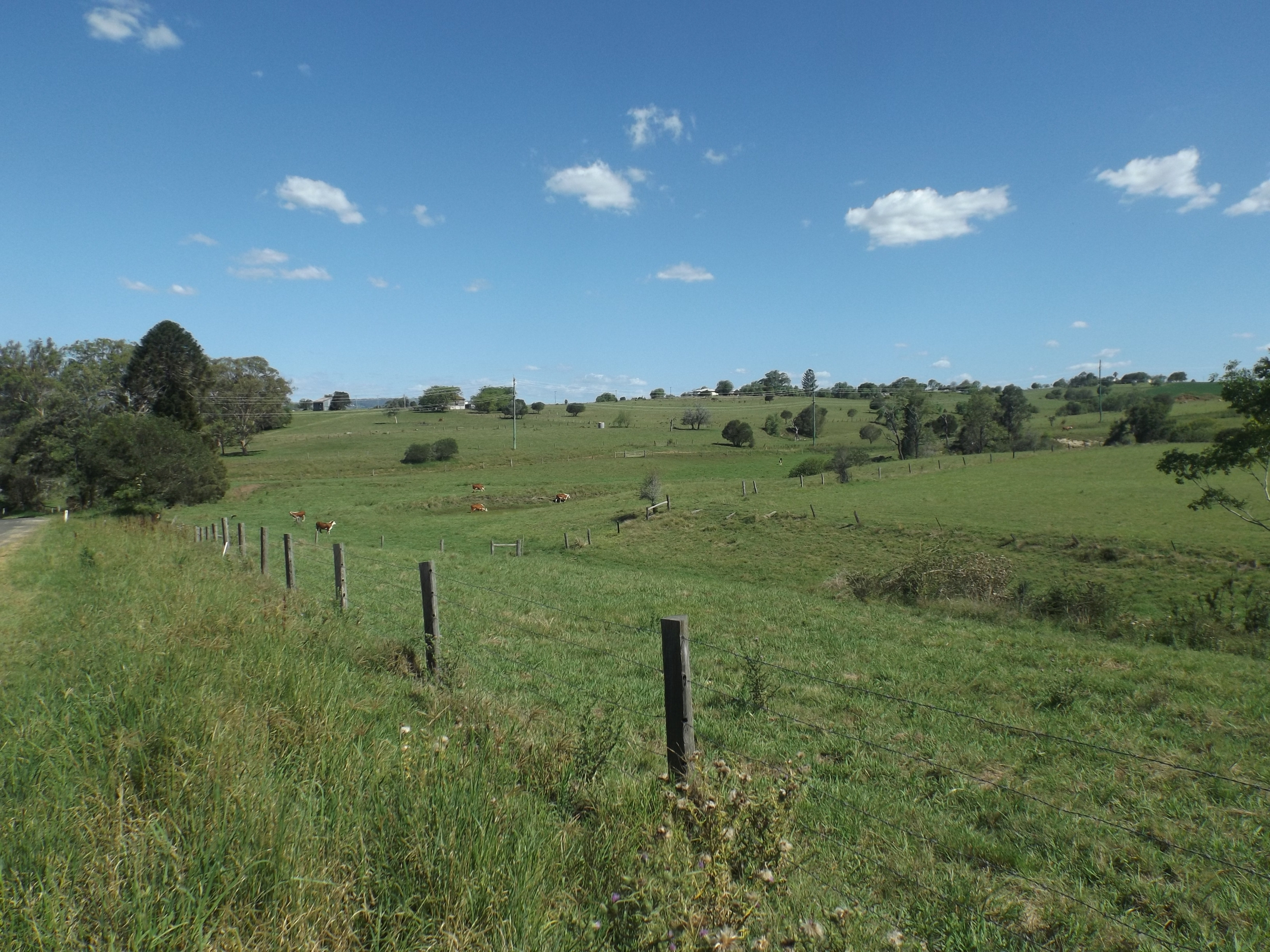
- Paddocks along Kents Pocket Road, 2016

- Interactive map of Templin
- Coordinates: 27.9711°S 152.6474°E
- Country: Australia
- State: Queensland
- LGA: Scenic Rim Region
- Location: 4.8 km (3.0 mi) NW of Boonah; 43.2 km (26.8 mi) W of Beaudesert; 52.1 km (32.4 mi) SSW of Ipswich CBD; 94.5 km (58.7 mi) SW of Brisbane CBD

Government
  - State electorate: Scenic Rim
  - Federal division: Wright

Area
  - Total: 12.2 km^{2} (4.7 sq mi)

Population
  - Total: 89 (2021 census)
  - Density: 7.30/km^{2} (18.89/sq mi)
- Time zone: UTC+10:00 (AEST)
- Postcode: 4310
Suburbs around Templin
Kalbar	Kalbar	Teviotville
Fassifern Valley	Templin	Hoya
Mount French	Mount French	Kents Pocket

Templin is a rural locality in the Scenic Rim Region, Queensland, Australia. In the 2021 census, Templin had a population of 89 people.

== Geography ==
The Boonah–Fassifern Road enters the locality from the south-east (Kents Pocket) and exits to west (Fassifern Valley).

== History ==
The locality was probably named by German settlers, William Gerner Zerner and Wilhelm F. Hohenhaus, both of whom came from Templin in Brandenburg, Prussia.

Templin State School opened on 18 January 1892 on land donated by Wilhelm Zerne in 1890. It closed on 31 December 1974. In 1975, the Fassifern District Historical Society took over the site to develop as the Templin Historical Village. Both the school building and the teacher's residence remain on the site.

In 1976, the former St John's Anglican Church was relocated from its original site in Cannon Creek to the Templin Historical Village. The church was built in 1911.

== Demographics ==
In the 2016 census, Templin had a population of 86 people.

In the 2021 census, Templin had a population of 89 people.

== Heritage listings ==
Templin has the following heritage-listed sites:

- 397 Boonah-Fassifern Road (27.9738°S 152.6504°E): former Templin State School

== Education ==
There are no schools in Templin. The nearest government primary schools are Kalbar State School in neighbouring Kalbar to the north-west and Boonah State School in Boonah to the south-west. The nearest government secondary school is Boonah State High School, also in Boonah.

== Attractions ==
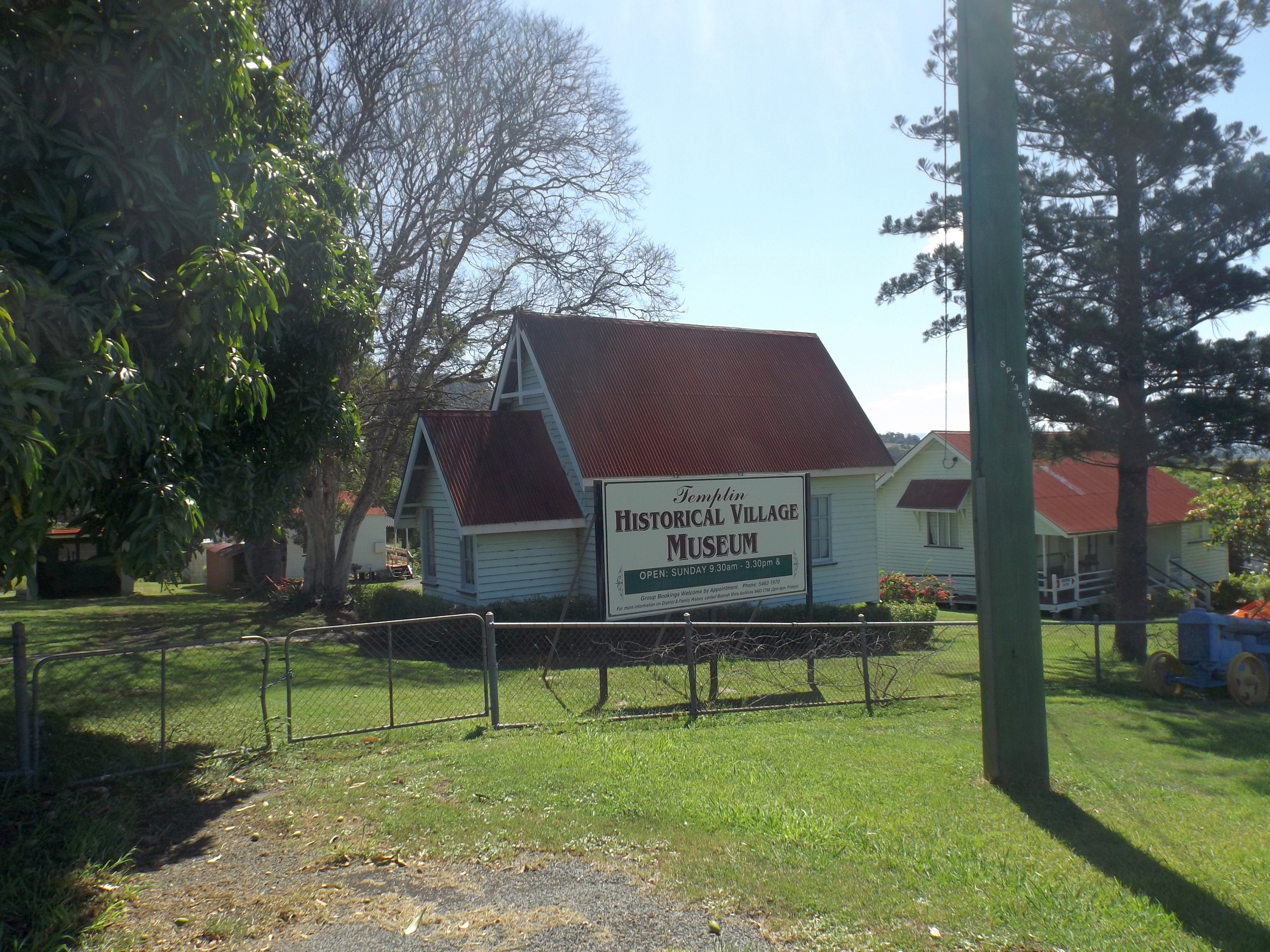
Templin Historical Village, 2016

The Templin Historical Village is at 397 Boonah-Fassifern Road (27.9738°S 152.6504°E); the museum is operated by the Fassifern Historical Society.
