= Frenches Creek, Queensland =

Frenches Creek
- Suburb
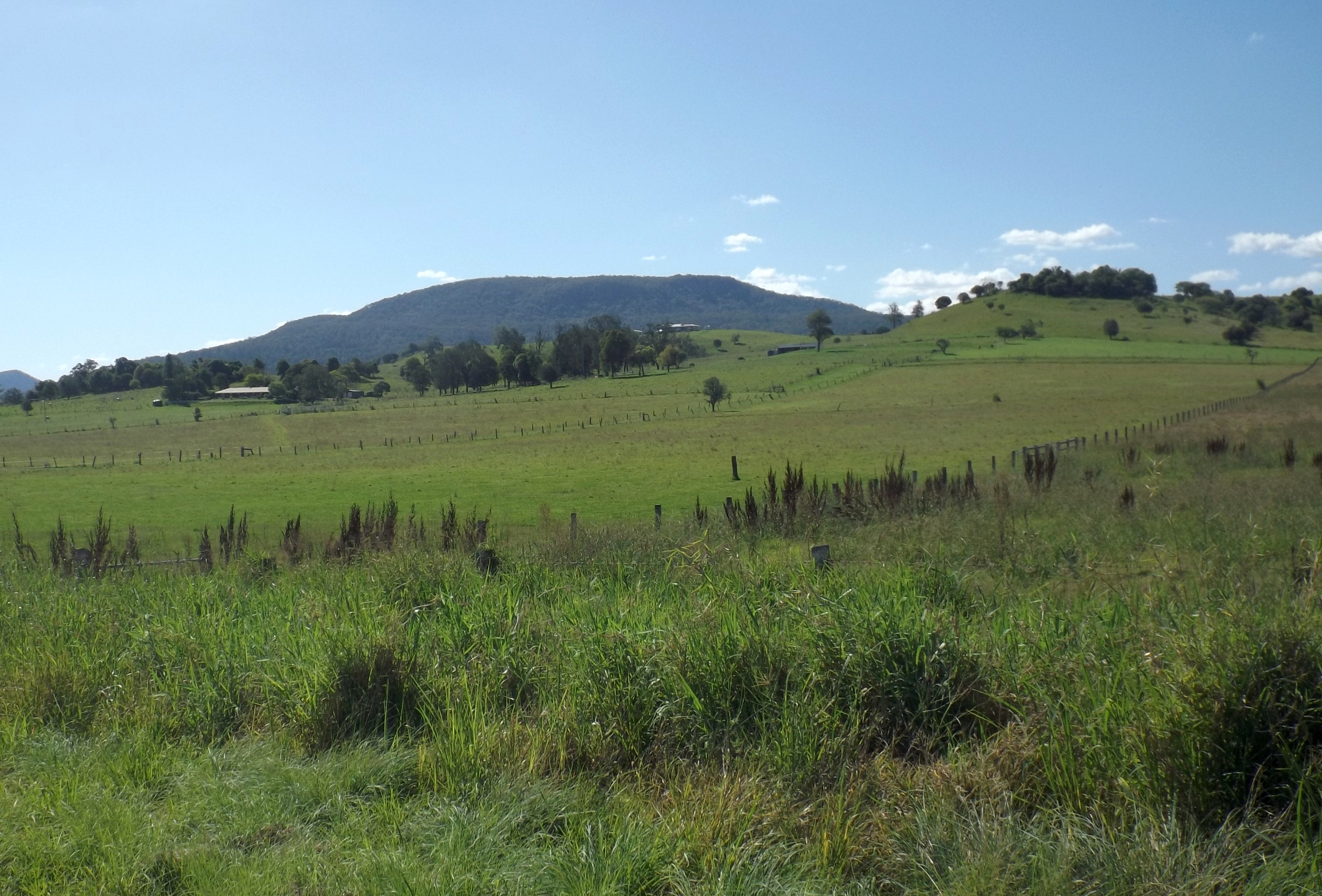
- Looking across Frenches Creek towards Mount French, 2016

- Interactive map of Frenches Creek
- Coordinates: 28.0227°S 152.6341°E
- Country: Australia
- State: Queensland
- LGA: Scenic Rim Region
- Location: 8.5 km (5.3 mi) SW of Boonah; 47.9 km (29.8 mi) W of Beaudesert; 56.8 km (35.3 mi) SSW of Ipswich; 96.0 km (59.7 mi) SW of Brisbane

Government
  - State electorate: Scenic Rim
  - Federal division: Wright

Area
  - Total: 9.7 km^{2} (3.7 sq mi)

Population
  - Total: 91 (2021 census)
  - Density: 9.38/km^{2} (24.30/sq mi)
- Time zone: UTC+10:00 (AEST)
- Postcode: 4310
Suburbs around Frenches Creek
Mount French	Mount French	Mount French
Bunjurgen	Frenches Creek	Dugandan
Bunjurgen	Bunjurgen	Dugandan

Frenches Creek is a rural locality in the Scenic Rim Region, Queensland, Australia. In the 2021 census, Frenches Creek had a population of 91 people.

== Geography ==
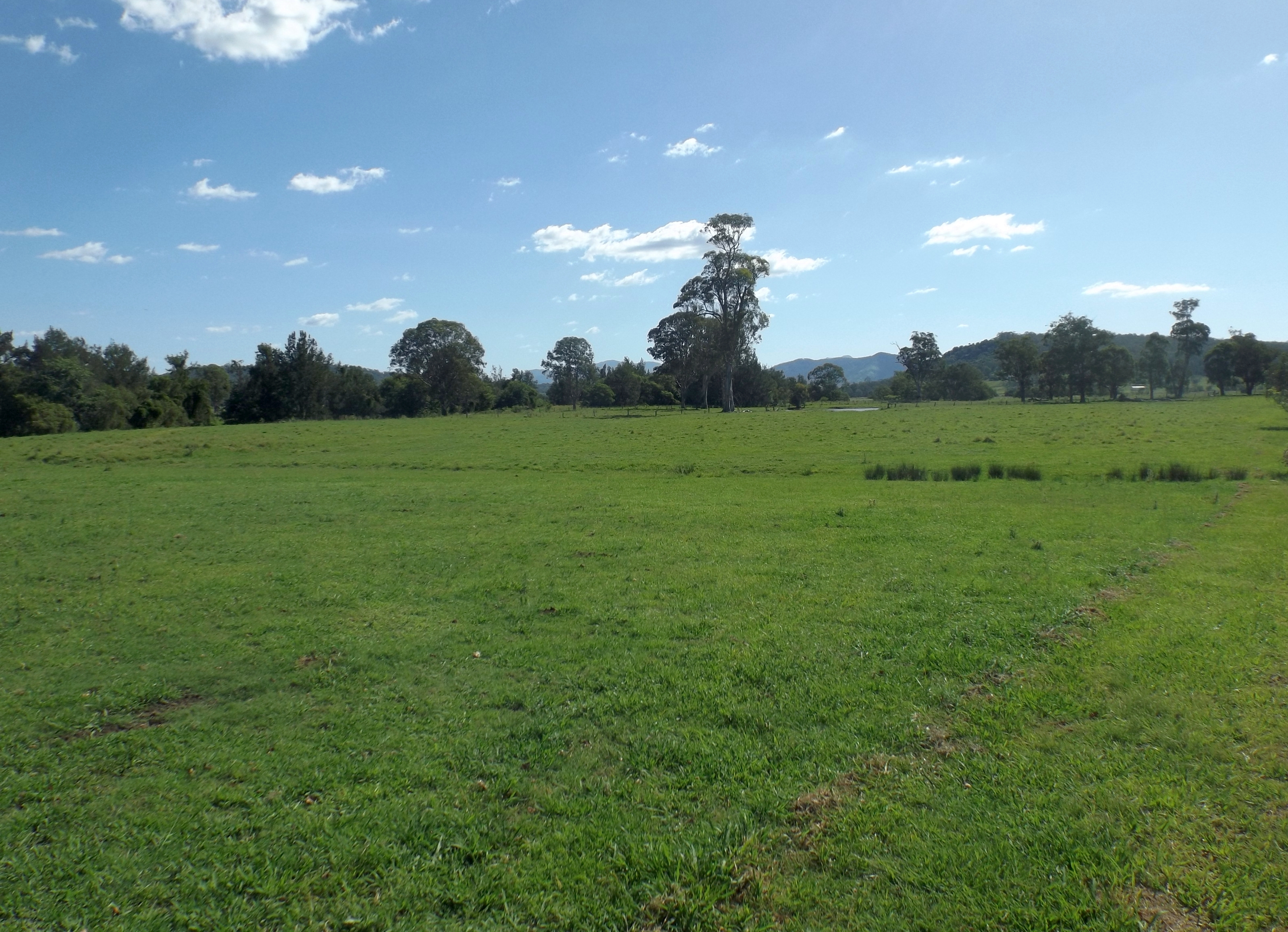
Paddocks along Mount Alford Road, 2016

Teviot Brook enter the locality from the south (Bunjurgen) where it forms the south-eastern boundary of the locality and then exits towards the east (Dugundan). The watercourse Frenches Creek (from which the creek's name likely derives) rises in the north-west of the locality on the slopes of Mount French and becomes a tributary to Teviot Brook.

Mount Alford Road enters the locality from the east (Dugundan) and exits to the south (Bunjurgen).

There is some irrigated cropping near Teviot Brook with most of the locality being used for grazing on native vegetation. The higher slopes of Mount French in the north-west of the locality are undeveloped.

== Demographics ==
In the 2016 census, Frenches Creek had a population of 85 people. The locality contains 36 households, in which 43.3% of the population are males and 56.7% of the population are females with a median age of 53, 15 years above the national average. The average weekly household income is $1,125, $313 below the national average.

In the 2021 census, Frenches Creek had a population of 91 people.

== Education ==
There are no schools in Frenches Creek. The nearest government primary schools are Boonah State School in Boonah to the north-west and Mount Alford State School in Mount Alford to the south. The nearest government secondary school is Boonah State High School in Boonah to the north-west.
