= Hoya, Queensland =

Hoya
- Suburb
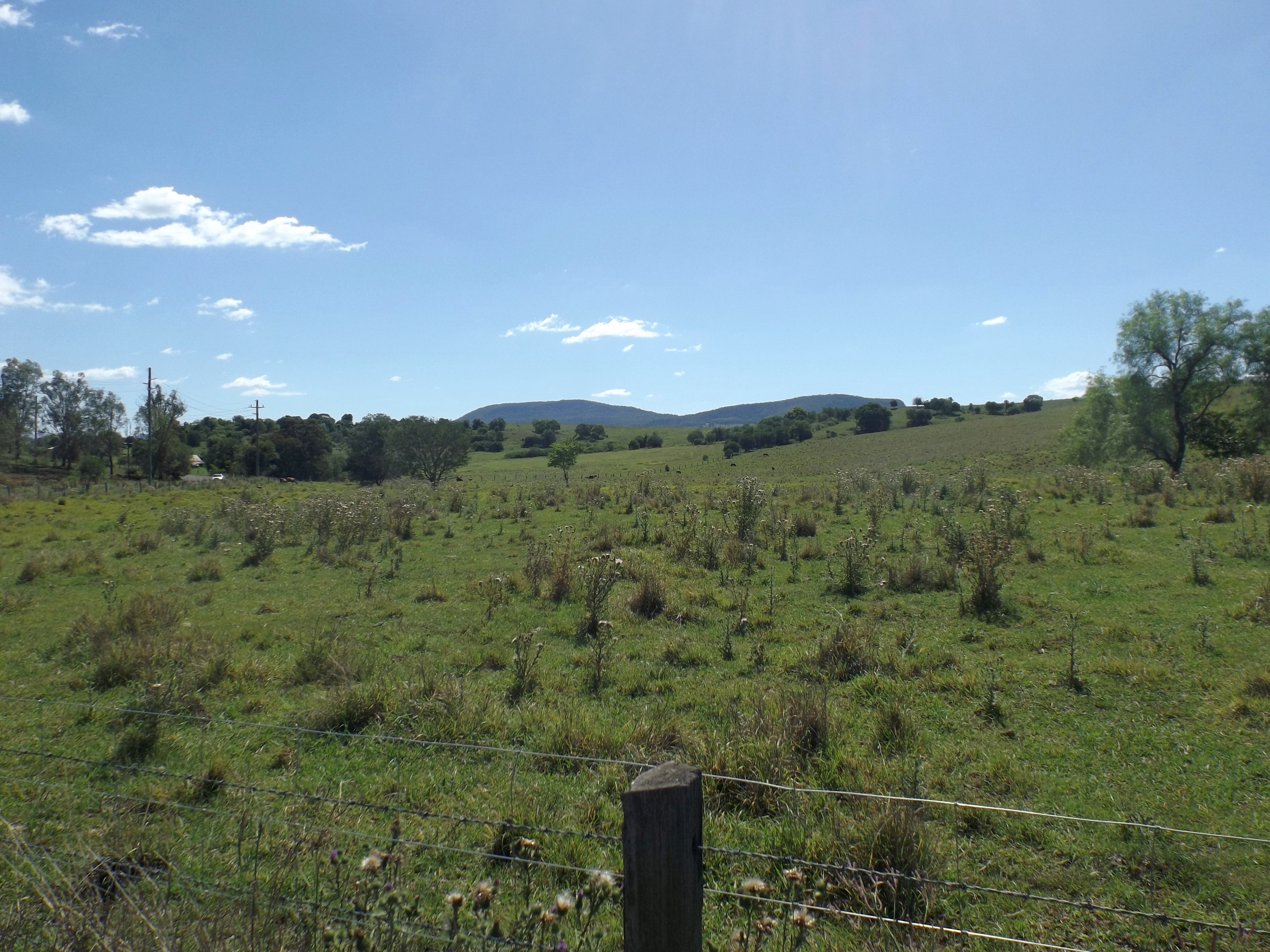
- Fields at Hoya, 2016

- Interactive map of Hoya
- Coordinates: 27.9744°S 152.6822°E
- Country: Australia
- State: Queensland
- LGA: Scenic Rim Region
- Location: 3.2 km (2.0 mi) NNE of Boonah; 37.9 km (23.5 mi) W of Beaudesert; 85.9 km (53.4 mi) SW of Brisbane CBD

Government
  - State electorate: Scenic Rim
  - Federal division: Wright

Area
  - Total: 8.2 km^{2} (3.2 sq mi)

Population
  - Total: 251 (2021 census)
  - Density: 30.61/km^{2} (79.3/sq mi)
- Time zone: UTC+10:00 (AEST)
- Postcode: 4310
Suburbs around Hoya
| Teviotville | Teviotville | Coulson |
| Templin | Hoya | Coulson |
| Kents Pocket | Boonah | Boonah |

Hoya is a rural locality in the Scenic Rim Region, Queensland, Australia. In the 2021 census, Hoya had a population of 251 people.

== Geography ==
Hoya is farming land approximately 150 metres about sea level.

The Boonah Fassifern Road (State Route 90) runs along part of the southern boundary.

The land use in the south-east of the locality is rural residential housing, extending from the Boonah urban area. Apart from this, the land use is predominantly grazing on native vegetation.

== History ==
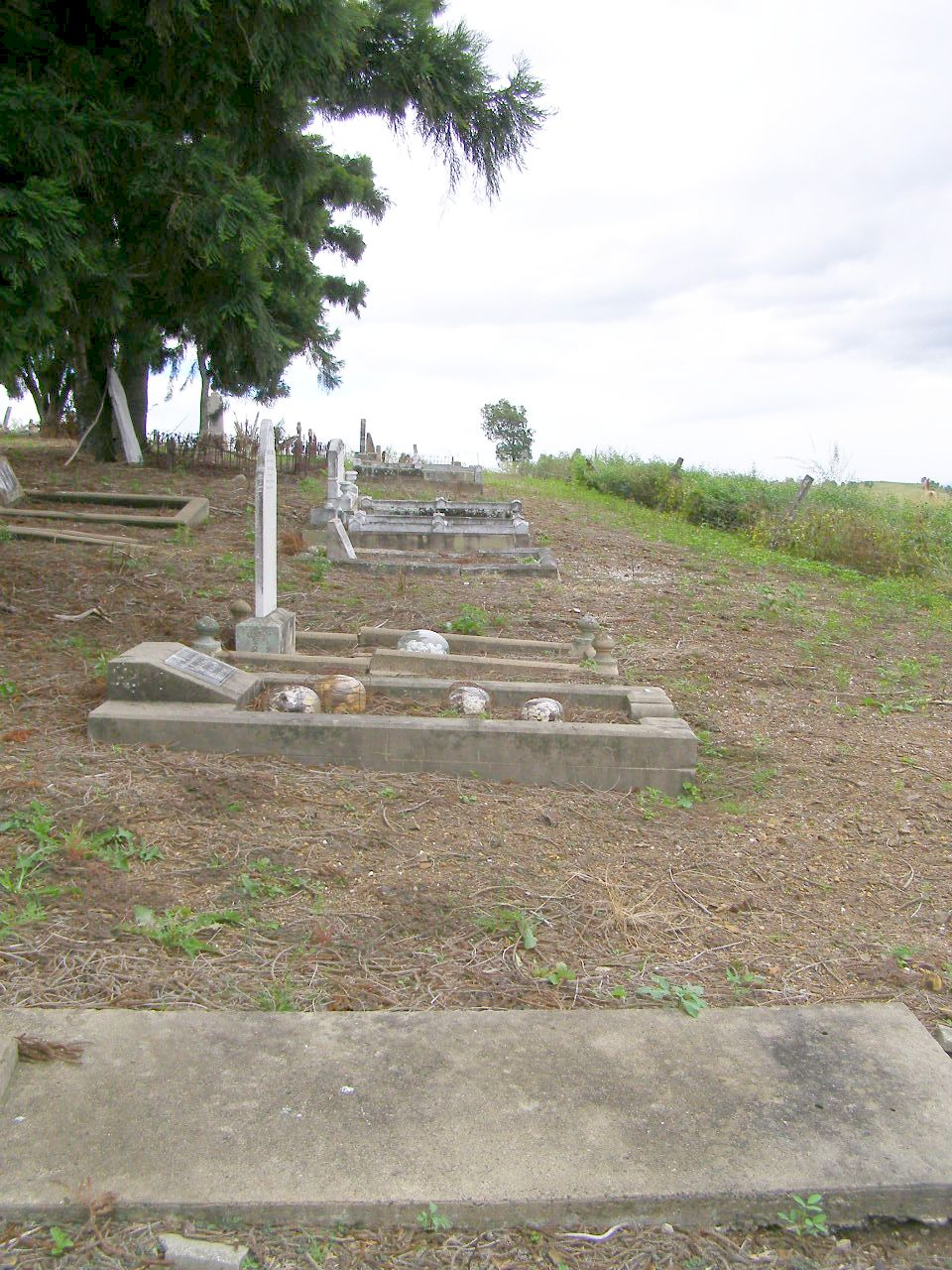
Lutheran cemetery, 2006

In 1882, St Matthew's Lutheran church was opened at 168 Podlich Road (27.970593°S 152.695°E). It was 30 by 20 feet (9.1 m × 6.1 m). It had a cemetery at the rear. In 1907, it was demolished to building a larger church, which was 36 by 20 feet (11.0 m × 6.1 m). In 1962, the church building was relocated to Church Street in Boonah.

The Fassifern railway line (Queensland's first branch railway line) opened from Ipswich to Harrisville on 10 July 1882. On 12 September 1887 the line was extended to Dugundan with Hoya being served by Hoya railway station on Hoya Road near the junction with Heise Road (27.9706°S 152.6891°E). The line closed in June 1964.

A postal receiving office was opened in Hoya on 22 January 1892. A post office opened on 1 July 1927. It closed on 1 April 1955.

== Demographics ==
In the 2016 census, Hoya had a population of 220 people. The locality containrf 87 households, in which 52.3% of the population were and 47.7% of the population were females with a median age of 52, 14 years above the national average. The average weekly household income was $1,406, $32 below the national average. None of Hoya's population was either of Aborigional or Torres Strait Islander descent. 74.5% of the population aged 15 or over was either registered or de facto married, while 25.5% of the population is not married. 23.9% of the population is currently attending some form of education. The most common nominated ancestries were Australian (31.2%), English (27.7%) and German (10.6%), while the most common country of birth was Australia (87.1%), and the most commonly spoken language at home was English (90.0%). The most common nominated religions were No religion (24.6%), the Uniting Church (14.5%) and Anglican (12.7%). The most common occupation was a professional (21.1%) and the majority/plurality of residents worked 40 or more hours per week (30.6%).

In the 2021 census, Hoya had a population of 251 people.

== Education ==
There are no schools in Hoya. The nearest government primary and secondary schools are Boonah State School and Boonah State High School, both in Boonah to the south. There is also a Catholic primary school in Boonah.

== Facilities ==
Hoya Lutheran Cemetery is at the rear of 168 Podlich Road (27.96908°S 152.69503°E).
