= Mount French, Queensland =

Mount French
- Suburb
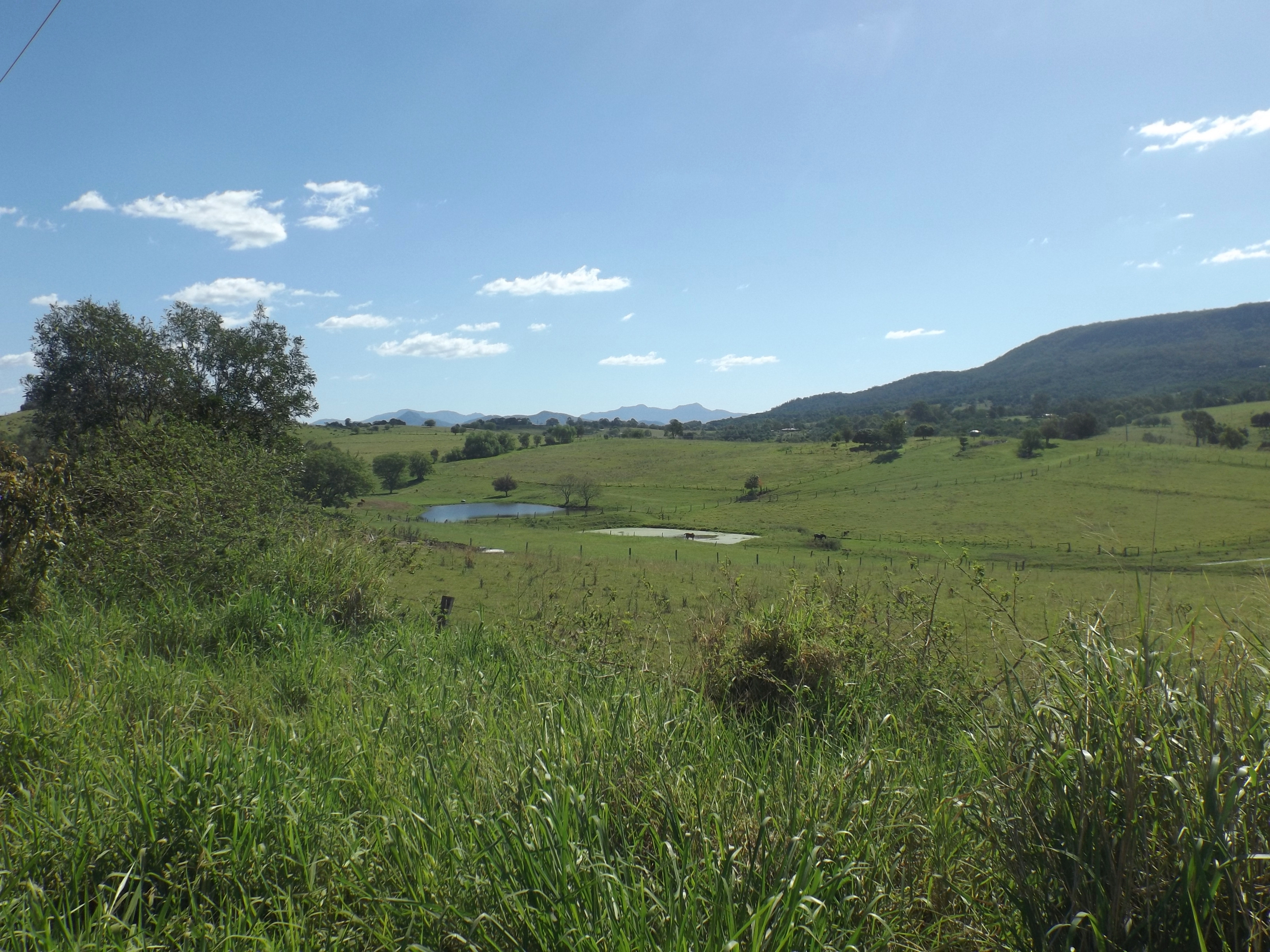
- Paddocks along Frank Road, 2016

- Interactive map of Mount French
- Coordinates: 27.9977°S 152.6269°E
- Country: Australia
- State: Queensland
- LGA: Scenic Rim Region
- Location: 6.2 km (3.9 mi) W of Boonah; 45.7 km (28.4 mi) W of Beaudesert; 54.6 km (33.9 mi) SSW of Ipswich; 92.4 km (57.4 mi) SW of Brisbane

Government
  - State electorate: Scenic Rim
  - Federal division: Wright

Area
  - Total: 16.7 km^{2} (6.4 sq mi)

Population
  - Total: 105 (2021 census)
  - Density: 6.29/km^{2} (16.28/sq mi)
- Time zone: UTC+10:00 (AEST)
- Postcode: 4310
Suburbs around Mount French
Fassifern Valley	Templin	Kents Pocket
Charlwood	Mount French	Boonah
Burjurgen	Frenches Creek	Dugandan

Mount French is a rural locality in the Scenic Rim Region, Queensland, Australia. In the 2021 census, Mount French had a population of 105 people.

== Geography ==
The locality of Mount French includes the mountain of the same name in the western half of the locality, part of which is within the Moogerah Peaks National Park. Elevations in the western half of the locality range from 300 metres (980 ft) above sea level to the two peaks of Mount French:

- Mount French (North Peak, also known as Mee-bor-rum) (27.9849°S 152.6247°E), 473 metres (1,552 ft)
- Mount French (South Peak, also known as Punchagin) (28.0037°S 152.6098°E), 598 metres (1,962 ft)

The western half of the locality is mostly undeveloped bushland.

The eastern part of the Mount French is lower, ranging from 200 to 280 metres (660 to 920 ft) above sea level, and is predominantly grazing land.

Mount French is a watershed with the creeks flowing west of the mountain ultimately flowing into the Bremer River, while the creeks flowing east of the mountain ultimately flow into the Logan River.

Mount French Road runs from the Boonah-Rathdowney Road in Boonah and Dugandan to the east through the centre of the locality to the national park and then north to the North Peak.

== History ==
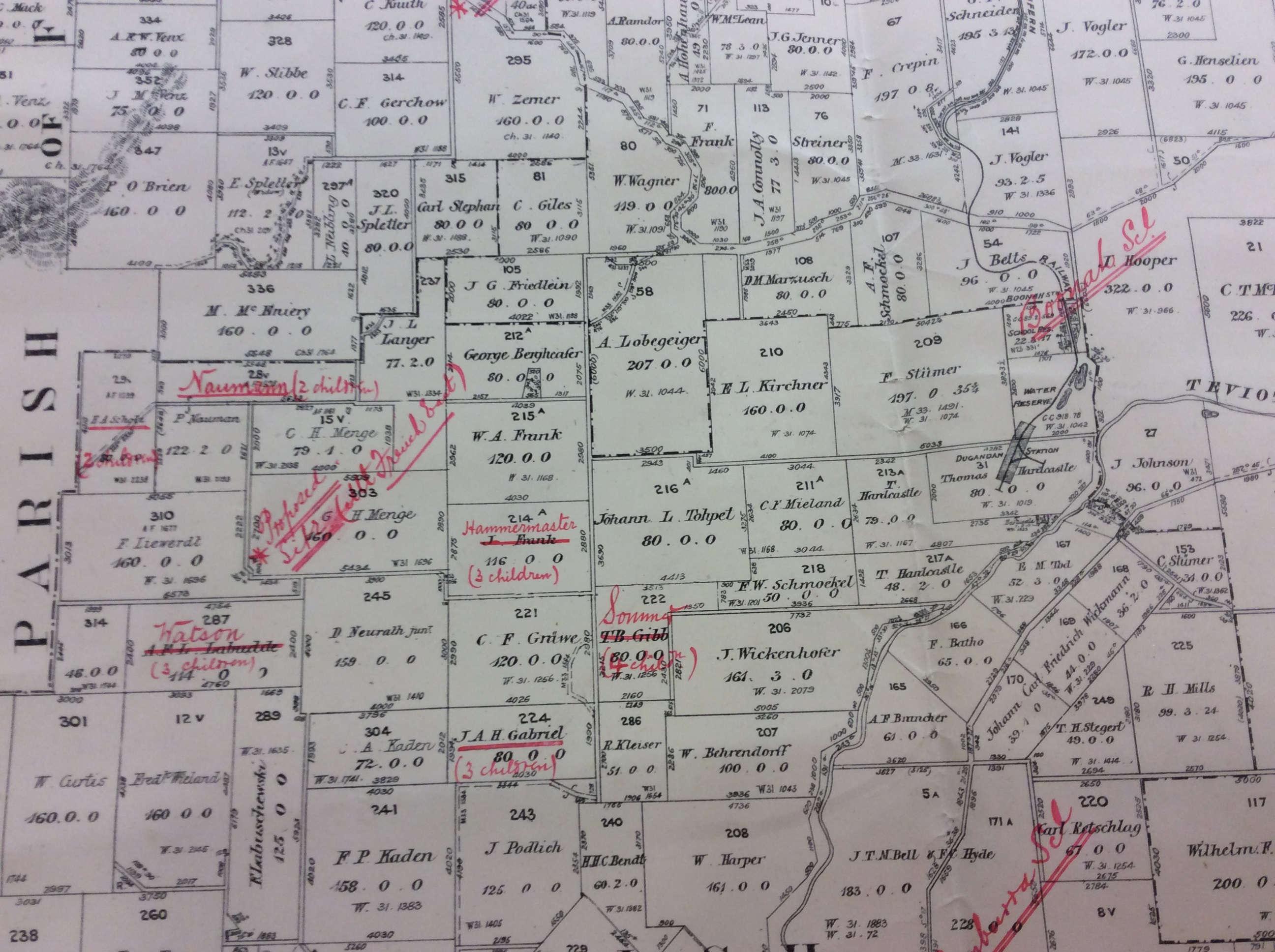
proposed site for Mt French School

Mount French Provisional School opened in 1900. On 1 January 1909, it became Mount French State School. It closed circa 1925. The approximate location of the school was 28.002°S 152.634°E.

== Demographics ==
In the 2016 census, Mount French had a population of 94 people. The locality contains 53 households, in which 50.0% of the population are males and 50.0% of the population are females with a median age of 54, 16 years above the national average. The average weekly household income is $985, $453 below the national average.

In the 2021 census, Mount French had a population of 105 people.

== History of Mount French State School ==
C.L. Watson sent a letter dated 31 July 1899 on behalf of parents in the Dugandan community, to the Secretary for Public Instruction requesting the establishment of a provisional school at Mount French East. Ernest Kirchner donated and transferred 2 acres 0 roods 25 perches subdivision 1 Portion 303 Coochin for the site of the school 1 February 1900. A subsidised Provisional School was approved 17 April 1900 with a subsidy payable of £74-15-6. The following tenders had been submitted for the construction of the school building: Edward Scholz £87-12-6 and Tronc and Sons £93-10-0. The committee was authorized to accept Scholz's tender. The building was completed 13 October 1900. The following school committee was appointed: Charles Graewe, Edward A Scholz and F William Hemmy (secretary) 20 February 1901.

The first teacher was Alice Watson wife of C L Watson secretary to the building committee for the Mount French School and a local farmer. She started 19 November 1900. She had taught for ten years as the first assistant at Central Infants Brisbane and was classified Class III Division I.

The school committee 9 March 1906 consisted of Albert Spletter: treasurer, Henry Falkenhagen: secretary, William Crepin: member and Mr Frank: chairman., school committee consisted of Fredrick William Krause: chairman, Henry Frank: secretary, John Carl Frank: treasurer, with Charles William Fredrick Freiberg and William Crepin being members 21 March 1923.

In August 1923 children broke into the school and broke the school clock and some set squares belonging to the pupils.

Over the years the number of pupils varied. According to the annual returns from 1900 to 1925 the average attendance ranged from 9 to 25.

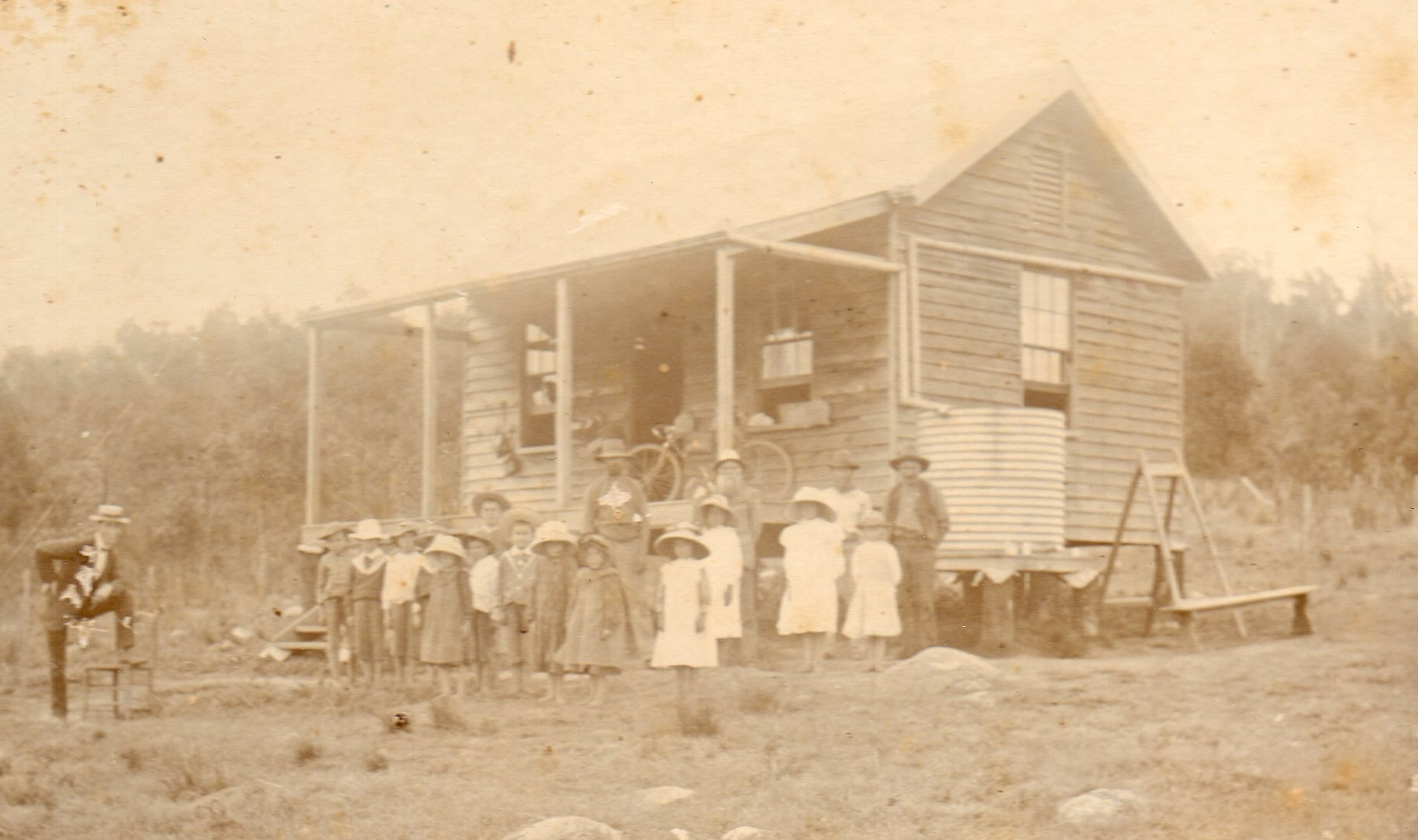
Teacher Mike O'Connor and pupils, circa 1910

The teachers at the school were:

- Alice Watson 1900–1901
- Alice Casey 1902–1904
- Joseph A Dixon 1905–1907
- Michael O’Connor 1908–1910
- Nan E Bott 1911–1912
- Katherine Dwyer 1913
- Hamilton L Bourke 1914–1915
- M Ewing 1916
- Lorenz A Krebs 1917
- L Ewing 1918
- Hiltoy 1919–1920
- Mary Robb 1922–1924
- Annie Mackay 1925

The school closed at the end of 1925 with teacher Annie Mackay being reassigned to part time schools at Carlyle and Jandowae East. The school building was moved and relocated to Mount Walker Lower in 1927.

The school site was transferred back to Ernest Kirchner 20 March 1928 with certificate of title number 156877.

== Education ==
There are no schools in Mount French. The nearest government primary school and secondary school are Boonah State School and Boonah State High School, both in neighbouring Boonah to the east.

== Attractions ==
The Mount French area within the Moogerah Peaks National Park offers a number of walking tracks for people of varying levels of bushwalking experience. The easiest walk (suitable for wheelchairs with assistance) includes Logan's Lookout (also known as North Cliff Lookout with panoramic views over the Fassifern Valley (27.9824°S 152.6222°E).
