= Boonah War Memorial =

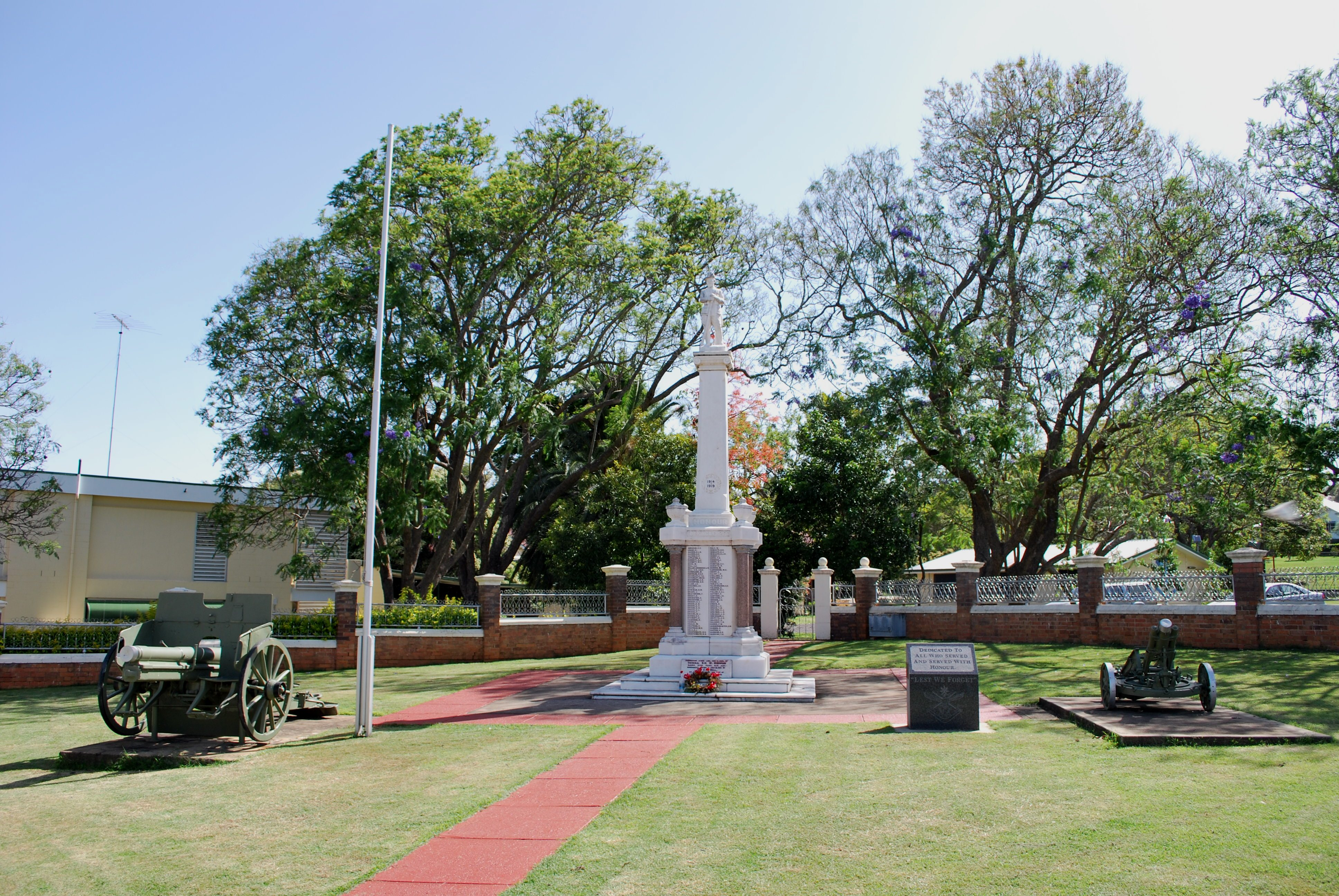
- War memorial in 2008

- Location within Queensland Location within Australia
- 27.9979°S 152.6804°E
- Location: Park Street, Boonah, Scenic Rim Region, Queensland, Australia

History
- Design period: 1919–1930s (interwar period)
- Built: 1920–1922

Queensland Heritage Register
- Official name: Boonah War Memorial and Memorial Park
- Type: state heritage (built)
- Designated: 21 October 1992
- Reference no.: 600035
- Significant period: 1920–
- Significant components: war trophy/ies, views to, pathway/walkway, memorial – park, memorial – soldier statue, flagpole/flagstaff, garden – bed/s, memorial – obelisk, fence/wall – perimeter, gate/s

Boonah War Memorial and Memorial Park is a heritage-listed memorial at Park Street, Boonah, Scenic Rim Region, Queensland, Australia. It was built from 1920 to 1922. It was added to the Queensland Heritage Register on 21 October 1992.

== History ==
The Boonah War Memorial is a major regional war memorial and was unveiled on 31 July 1920 as part of the visit to Boonah by the Prince of Wales (later King Edward VIII) who was visiting with Mrs G A Bell of nearby Coochin Coochin Station (whose three sons served in the First World War). The marble and granite memorial was designed and executed by F Williams and Company and honours the 374 local men who served during the First World War, including the 69 dead.

The town of Boonah was established as support for the pastoral runs in the area, of which Coochin Coochin was the first. Prior to the establishment of the town, all stores were brought by bullock dray from Ipswich twice yearly. After the extension of the railway to Dugandan in 1887, the surrounding district was rapidly populated and the town of Boonah prospered.

On 19 May 1920, the foundation stone for the memorial was laid by General Sir William Birdwood. The monument was erected for £600 which was raised by public subscriptions organised by a memorial committee. The specifically designed memorial park was opened on Anzac Day in 1922 with the unveiling of the fence by war hero and politician Captain Arnold Wienholt.

Australia, and Queensland in particular, had few civic monuments before the First World War. The memorials erected in its wake became our first national monuments, recording the devastating impact of the war on a young nation. Australia lost 60,000 from a population of about 4 million, representing one in five of those who served. No previous or subsequent war has made such an impact on the nation.

Even before the end of the war, memorials became a spontaneous and highly visible expression of national grief. To those who erected them, they were as sacred as grave sites, substitute graves for the Australians whose bodies lay in battlefield cemeteries in Europe and the Middle East. British policy decreed that the Empire war dead were to be buried where they fell. The word "cenotaph", commonly applied to war memorials at the time, literally means "empty tomb".

Australian war memorials are distinctive in that they commemorate not only the dead. Australians were proud that their first great national army, unlike other belligerent armies, was composed entirely of volunteers, men worthy of honour whether or not they made the supreme sacrifice. Many memorials honour all who served from a locality, not just the dead, providing valuable evidence of community involvement in the war. Such evidence is not readily obtainable from military records, or from state or national listings, where names are categorised alphabetically or by military unit.

Australian war memorials are also valuable evidence of imperial and national loyalties, at the time, not seen as conflicting; the skills of local stonemasons, metalworkers and architects; and of popular taste. In Queensland, the soldier statue was the popular choice of memorial, whereas the obelisk predominated in the southern states, possibly a reflection of Queensland's larger working-class population and a lesser involvement of architects.

Many of the First World War monuments have been updated to record local involvement in later conflicts, and some have fallen victim to unsympathetic re-location and repair.

Although there are many different types of memorials in Queensland, the digger statue is the most common. It was the most popular choice of communities responsible for erecting the memorials, embodying the ANZAC Spirit and representing the qualities of the ideal Australian: loyalty, courage, youth, innocence and masculinity. The digger was a phenomenon peculiar to Queensland, perhaps because other states had followed Britain's lead and established Advisory Boards made up of architects and artists, prior to the erection of war memorials. The digger statue was not highly regarded by artists and architects who were involved in the design of relatively few Queensland memorials.

Most statues were constructed by local masonry firms, although some were by artists or imported.

The Boonah memorial was designed and executed by well known and highly regarded Ipswich masonry firm, F Williams and Company.

The digger statue on the Boonah Memorial is represented in the casual stance synonymous with Williams diggers.

== Description ==
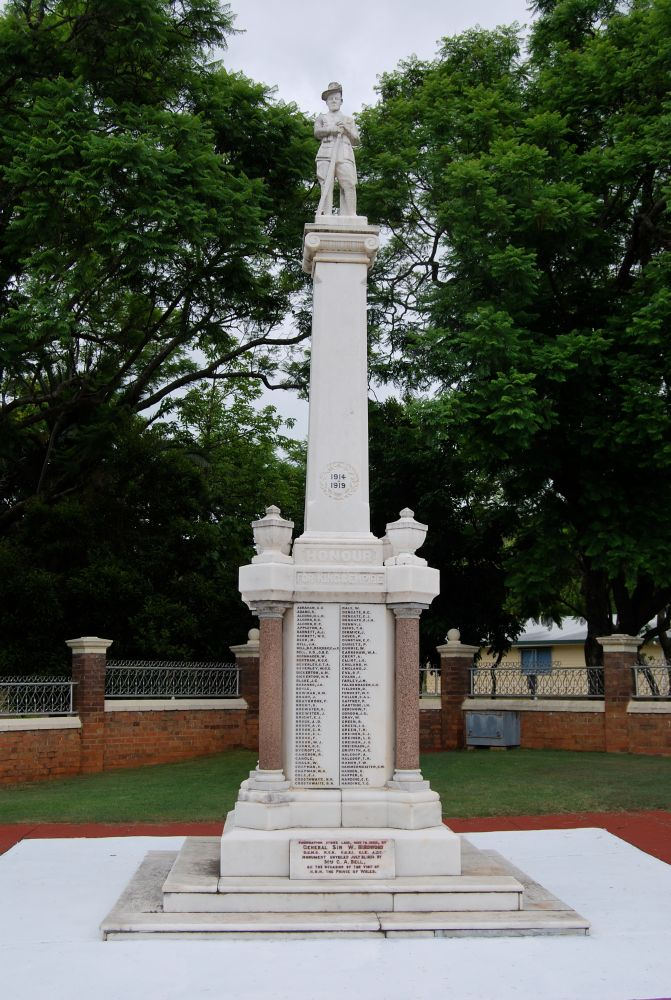
Boonah War Memorial, 2008

The First World War Memorial is situated in a Memorial Park in Boonah, addressing the intersection of Park and Yeates Streets. The park is enclosed by a substantial brick and wrought iron fence with concrete dressings painted white. Wrought iron gates are located at the front and rear corners and are flanked by white painted pillars with ball finials. All wrought iron has been painted silver. The park is laid out formally on a diagonal axis running from the intersection of Park and Yeates Streets to the opposite corner. A central red-painted concrete path with white-painted concrete kerbing leads to the memorial, which is surrounded by symmetrical tiered garden beds, also kerbed. The memorial is flanked by two war trophies and a flagstaff is located on the south western side. The larger trophy, a German FK96 n.A. field gun, was bought by the townspeople in 1921 after they had rejected the Queensland War Trophy Committee's earlier offer of two captured German machine guns. Significantly, Boonah thereby became the only Australian town (or city) ever to have purchased its own Great War trophy gun (albeit, the only privately owned Great War trophy gun ever to reach these shores).

The memorial is mainly of coarse Ulam marble and comprises a pedestal surmounted by an obelisk and a digger statue.

It sits on a marble base comprising two shallow steps and a third, deeper one, all smooth-faced. The foundation stone is located on the front face of the top step.

Surmounting the base is the pedestal. It sits on a marble step which has square projections at each corner. These each form a base for free-standing columns of red polished granite with marble Doric Order capitals and bases. The columns support a large cornice which is surmounted by four marble corner urns. In the centre of the columns are recessed marble plates, the leaded names of the 374 local men who served in the First World War. The names of the 69 dead are located on the north east face and the rear face is reserved for the names of nurses and chaplains.

Projecting from the centre of the pedestal is the marble obelisk, approximately 20 feet (6.1 m) high and slightly tapered. It has stop chamfers to each corner and stands on a marble base with cyma recta mouldings. It is capped by a marble Ionic order capital and has a wreath carved around the leaded dates of the war on the lower section of the front face.

Surmounting the obelisk is the digger statue, which is slightly smaller than life-sized. The soldier is standing at ease with his head bowed and his hands resting on his reversed rifle, which rests by his right foot and is held by his body. A tree stump is located behind the left leg for support.

== Heritage listing ==
Boonah War Memorial and Memorial Park was listed on the Queensland Heritage Register on 21 October 1992 having satisfied the following criteria.

The place is important in demonstrating the evolution or pattern of Queensland's history.

War Memorials are important in demonstrating the pattern of Queensland's history as they are representative of a recurrent theme that involved most communities throughout the state. They provide evidence of an era of widespread Australian patriotism and nationalism, particularly during and following the First World War. The monuments manifest a unique documentary record and are demonstrative of popular taste in the inter-war period.

The place is important in demonstrating the principal characteristics of a particular class of cultural places.

Erected in 1920, the major regional memorial at Boonah demonstrates the principal characteristics of a commemorative structure erected as an enduring record of a major historical event. This is achieved through the use of appropriate materials and design elements. As a digger statue it is representative of the most popular form of memorial in Queensland.

The place is important because of its aesthetic significance.

The memorial in its setting is of aesthetic significance both for its high level of workmanship, design and materials and as a dominant landmark within the townscape. It is an uncommon example of a war memorial that survives as part of a specifically designed and intact memorial setting.

The place has a strong or special association with a particular community or cultural group for social, cultural or spiritual reasons.

The memorial has a strong association with the community as evidence of the impact of a major historic event and has special association with Ipswich masonry firm F Williams and Company as evidence of their work.

The place has a special association with the life or work of a particular person, group or organisation of importance in Queensland's history.

The memorial has a strong association with the community as evidence of the impact of a major historic event and has special association with Ipswich masonry firm F Williams and Company as evidence of their work.
