= Kents Pocket, Queensland =

Kents Pocket
- Suburb
- Interactive map of Kents Pocket
- Coordinates: 27.9877°S 152.6563°E
- Country: Australia
- State: Queensland
- LGA: Scenic Rim Region
- Location: 3.0 km (1.9 mi) NW of Boonah; 41.3 km (25.7 mi) W of Beaudesert; 50.3 km (31.3 mi) SSW of Ipswich CBD; 88.0 km (54.7 mi) SW of Brisbane CBD

Government
  - State electorate: Scenic Rim
  - Federal division: Wright

Area
  - Total: 3.9 km^{2} (1.5 sq mi)

Population
  - Total: 21 (2021 census)
  - Density: 5.38/km^{2} (13.9/sq mi)
- Time zone: UTC+10:00 (AEST)
- Postcode: 4310
Suburbs around Kents Pocket
| Templin | Templin | Hoya |
| Mount French | Kents Pocket | Boonah |
| Mount French | Mount French | Boonah |

Kents Pocket is a rural locality in the Scenic Rim Region, Queensland, Australia. In the 2021 census, Kents Pocket had a population of 21 people.

== Geography ==
The Boonah–Fassifern Road (State Route 90) runs through from east to north.

== Demographics ==
In the 2016 census, Kents Pocket had a population of 24 people. The locality contains 10 households, in which 51.7% of the population are males and 48.3% of the population are females with a median age of 50, 12 years above the national average. The average weekly household income is $2,124, $688 above the national average.

In the 2021 census, Kents Pocket had a population of 21 people.

== Education ==
There are no schools in Kents Pocket. The nearest government primary school is Boonah State School in neighbouring Boonah to the east. The nearest government secondary school is Boonah State High School, also in Boonah.
