= Boonah, Queensland =

Boonah
- Town
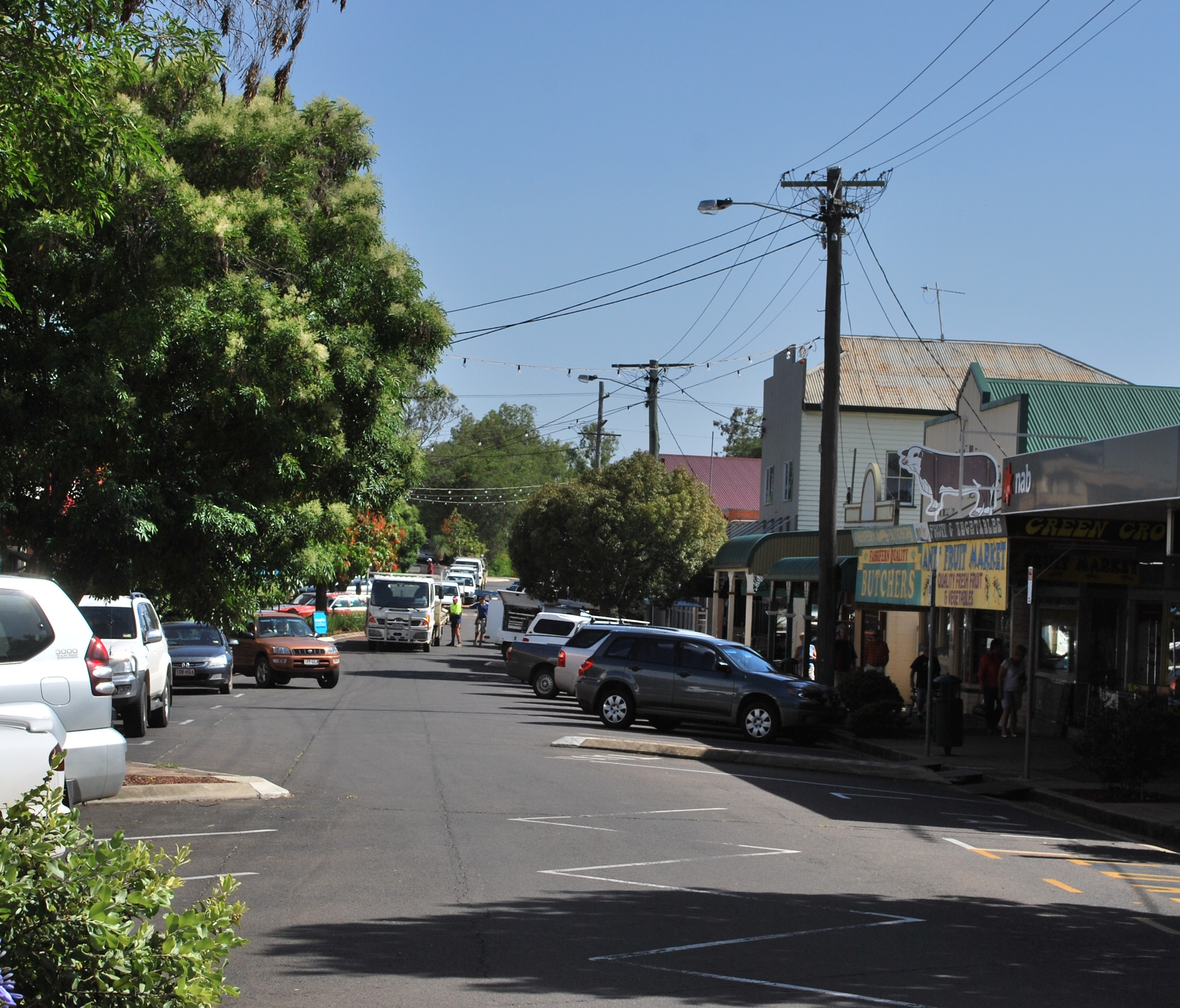
- Main street of Boonah, 2008

- Interactive map of Boonah
- Coordinates: 27.9997°S 152.6816°E
- Country: Australia
- State: Queensland
- LGA: Scenic Rim Region
- Location: 39.1 km (24.3 mi) W of Beaudesert; 46.4 km (28.8 mi) S of Ipswich; 86.2 km (53.6 mi) SW of Brisbane
- Established: 1882

Government
  - State electorate: Scenic Rim
  - Federal division: Wright

Area
  - Total: 11.1 km^{2} (4.3 sq mi)

Population
  - Total: 2,557 (2021 census)
  - Density: 230.4/km^{2} (596.6/sq mi)
- Time zone: UTC+10:00 (AEST)
- Postcode: 4310
Localities around Boonah
Hoya	Coulson	Allandale
Kents Pocket	Boonah	Allandale
Mount French	Dugandan	Allandale

Boonah is a rural town and locality in the Scenic Rim Region, Queensland, Australia. In the 2021 census, the locality of Boonah had a population of 2,557 people.

== Geography ==
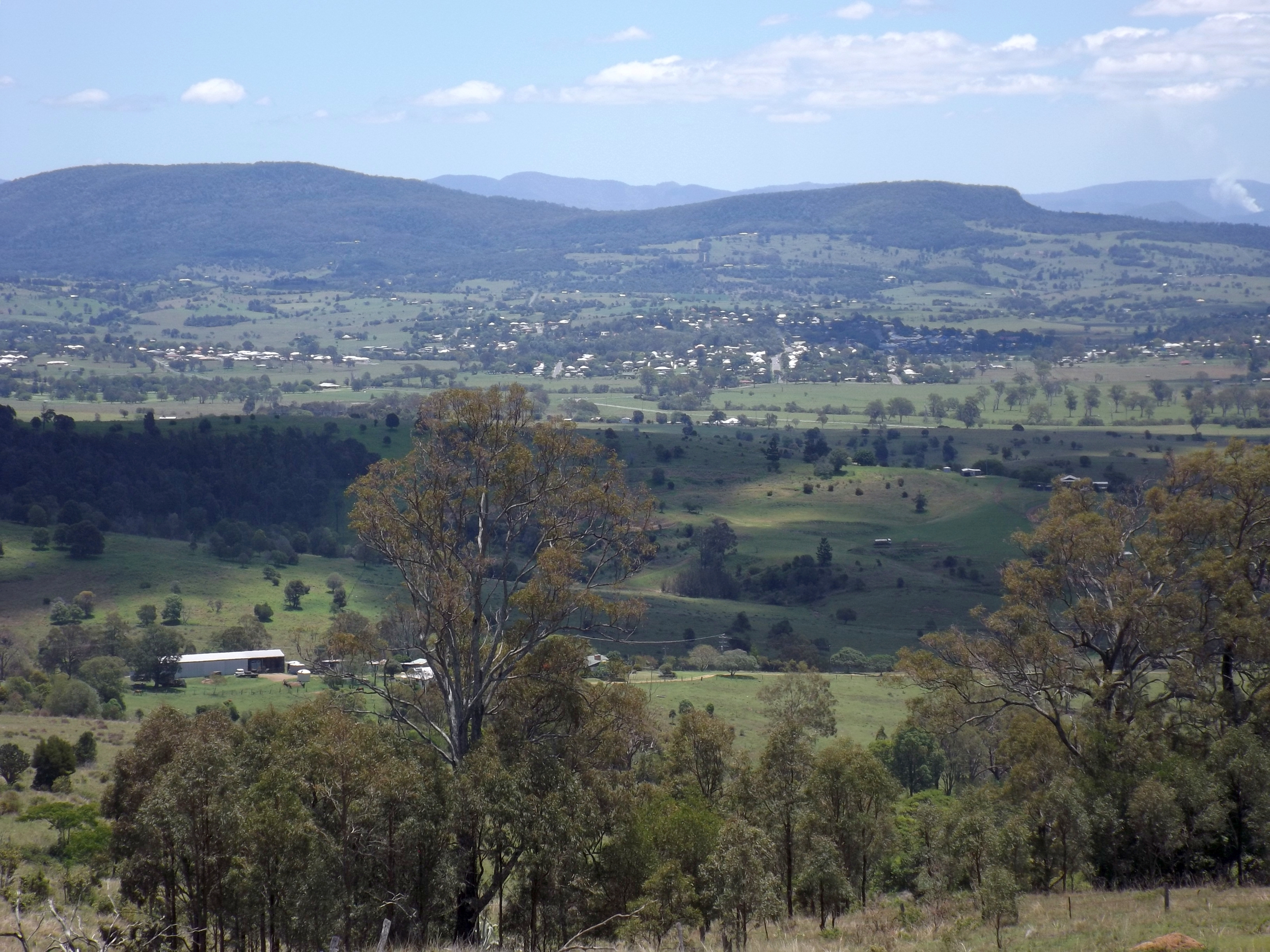
Mount French, Dugandan and the town of Boonah, 2016

The town is positioned near the Fassifern Valley, McPherson Range and Main Range. It is surrounded by hills, including Mount French and other Moogerah Peaks. Frog Buttress is a popular rock climbing cliff on the north-west side of Mount French.

The Wyaralong Dam was constructed east of Boonah on Teviot Brook, a tributary of the Logan River. At full supply level, water would have inundated parts of the road connecting Boonah and Beaudesert, so a new section of road has been built. Water for the town is supplied from Lake Moogerah on Reynold's Creek, a tributary of the Bremer River. Maroon Dam is another reservoir built 25 kilometres (16 mi) south of Boonah at the base of the McPherson Range.

State Route 93, a road with two names, runs through the locality, entering from the north as Ipswich–Boonah Road (Coronation Drive in the town) and exiting to the south as Boonah–Rathdowney Road (Yeates Avenue). Boonah–Fassifern Road (State Route 90) exits to the west from its junction with the other roads.

== History ==
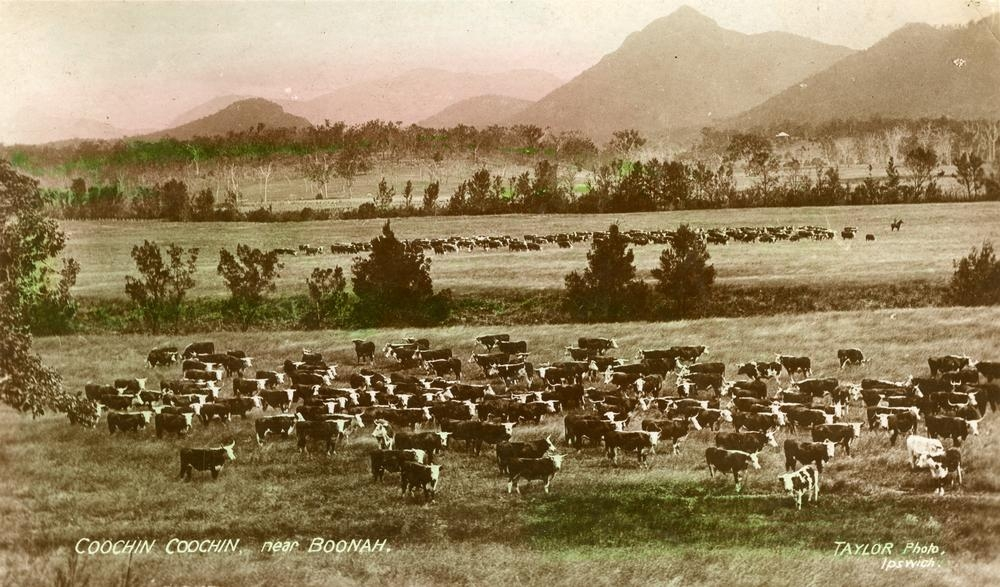
Postcard of Hereford cattle on Coochin Coochin Station, near Boonah, 1909. In the background Mount Moon and both the McPherson Range and Main Range (Great Dividing Range) of the Scenic Rim can be seen.

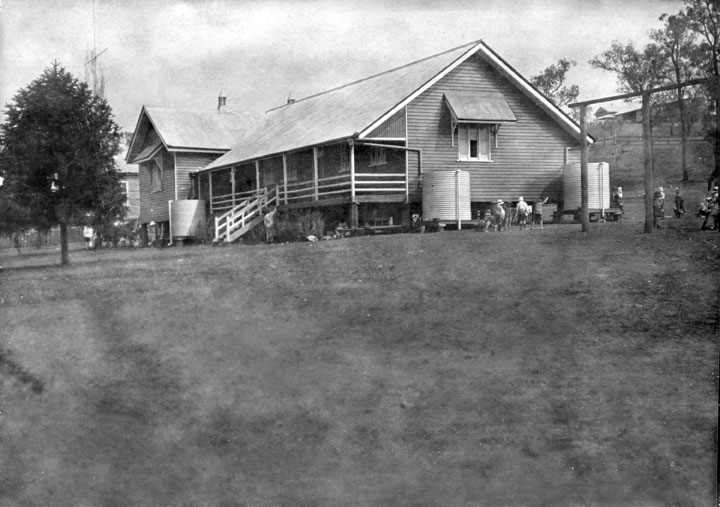
Boonah State School, circa 1917

Ugarapul the Aboriginal language of South-East Queensland.the name and dialect of a clan that is used within the local government boundaries of City of Ipswich, Lockyer Valley Region and Somerset Region.

The history of Boonah township is connected to the nearby settlement of Dugandan which was named after the Dugandan pastoral run that was taken up in August 1844 by Macquarie McDonald and his brother Campbell Livingstone McDonald. Dugandan was one of the earliest pastoral holdings in Queensland. In its early years the area was stocked with sheep but the region was discovered to be well suited for cattle and over time became renowned for the quality of its beef and dairy herds. Adjacent to the property of Dugandan was Coochin Coochin station. In January 1861, a massacre of Ugarapul people, estimated to be as many as 40, is recorded in the area of Hardie's Station, Dugandan Scrub. In 1873, part of the Coochin Coochin pastoral run was acquired by Frederick Macarthur Bowman who named his property Denelgin. Frederick Bowman took advantage of the suitability of the area for cattle and is considered one of the dairying pioneers of the region.

Variously known as Dugandan Scrub and Blumbergville, Boonah was also positioned within the boundaries of the early Dugandan property. Following the introduction of the Crown Lands Alienation Act of 1868 and the subdivision of the large pastoral runs, the settlement fell within the boundaries of a new 320 acre property acquired by John Hooper in 1878.

Due to the scattered distribution of European settlers, the close proximity of the two settlements that would eventually become the townships of Dugandan and Boonah and the lack of a clear geographical centre, during the 1870s–1880s the names Dugandan, Blumbergville and Boonah were used interchangeably. As late as 1888, the courts of petty sessions were described as occurring at "Boonah, otherwise known as Blumbergville".

The Dugandan Provisional School opened on 15 July 1878 between Dugandan Scrub and Dugandan Flats next to the Teviot Brook on land which would eventually fall within the boundaries of the Blumbergville/Boonah township. The school was the first building in the township. On 30 May 1887 it became Dugandan State School. In 1895 it was renamed Boonah State School. (A separate Dugandan State School operated between 1917 and 1966 in Dugandan).

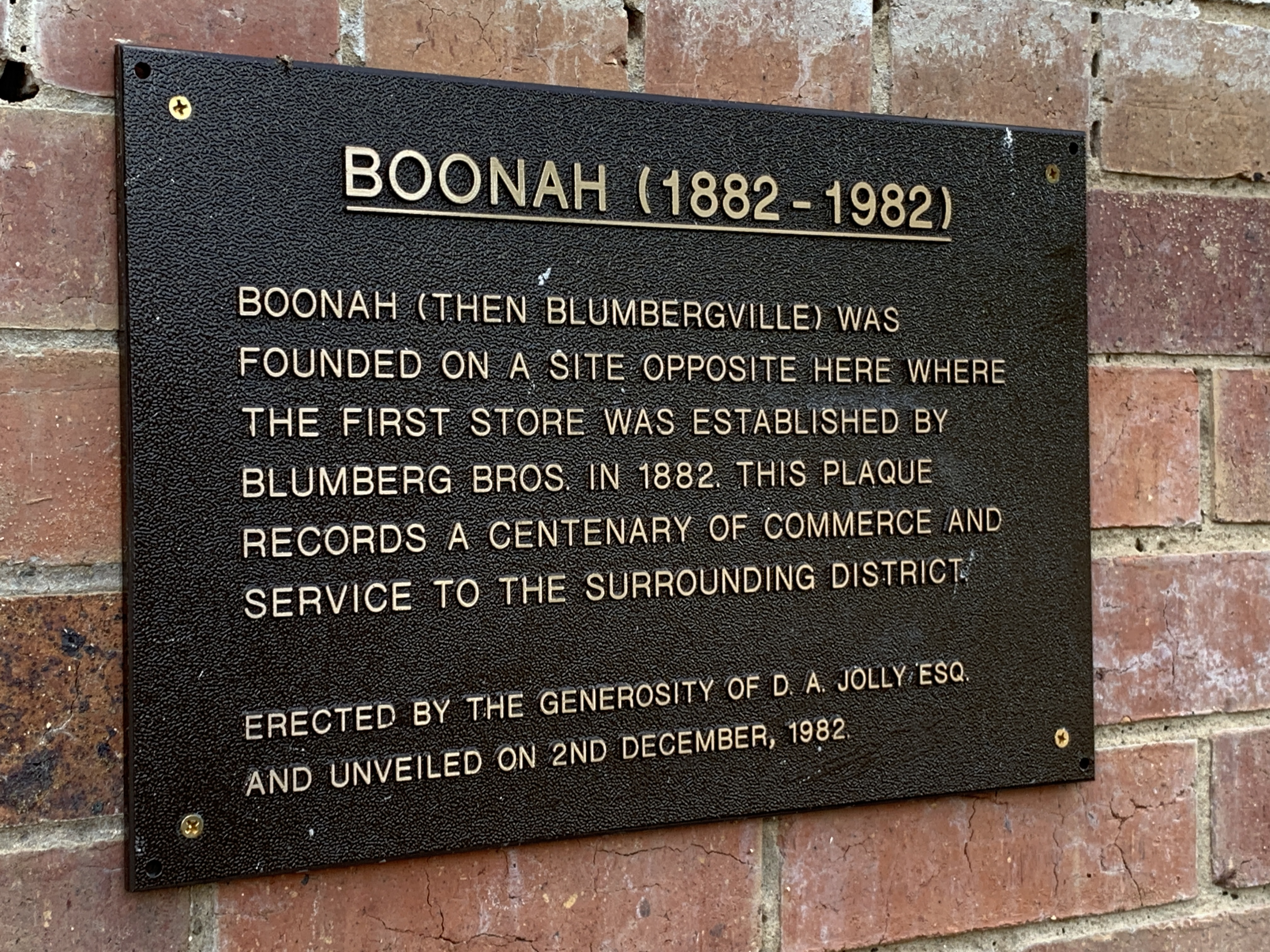
Plaque celebrating the centenary (1882–1982) of Boonah, 2020

By 1880, 40 families were living in the Dugandan Scrub area and Blumbergville was starting to be established. Blumbergville took its name from a store owned by three brothers, Max, Levi and Adolf Blumberg, located on the later site of the Commercial Hotel in High Street, Boonah.

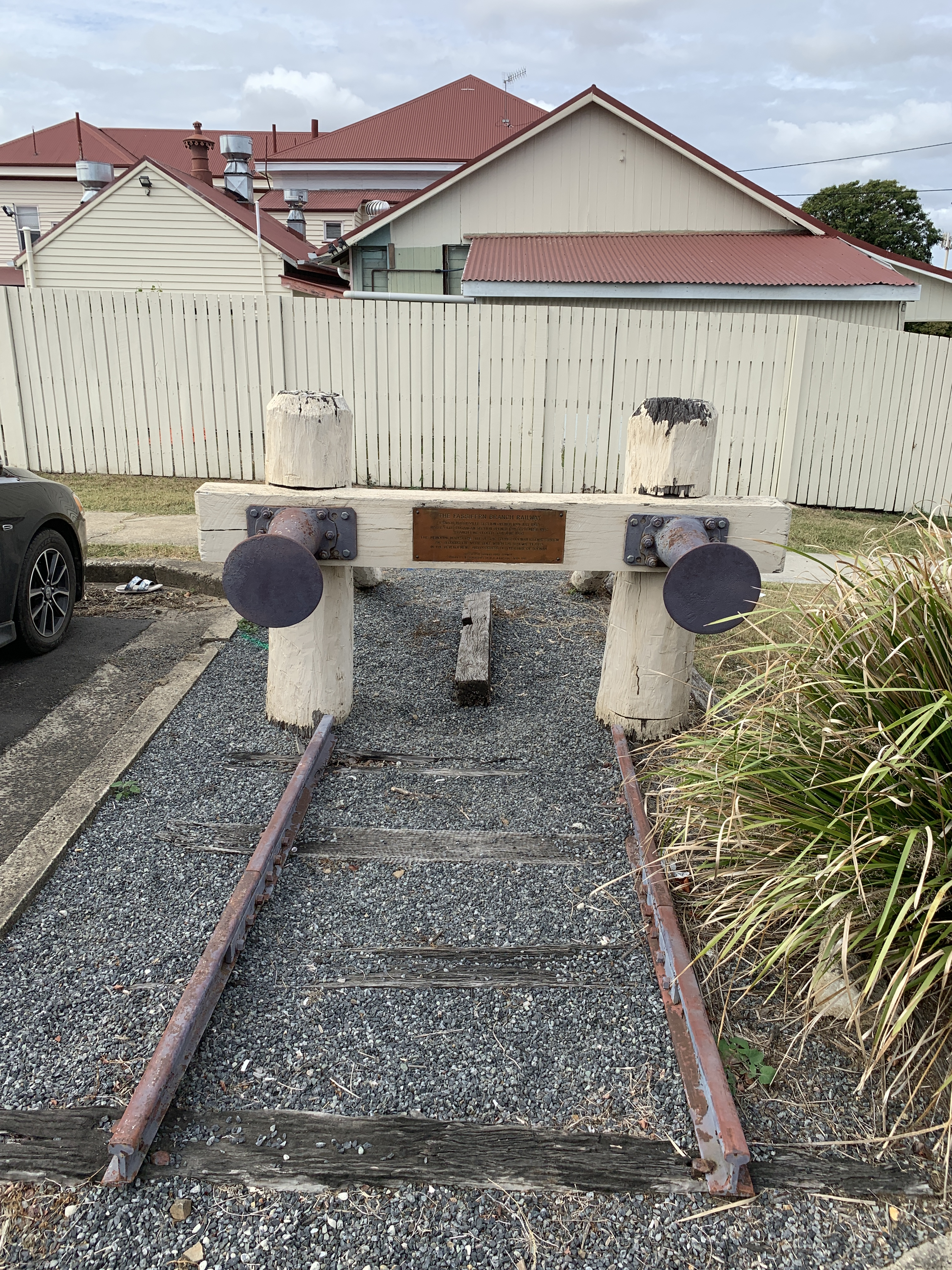
Fassifern Branch Railway Memorial on the site of the former Boonah railway station, 2020

The Fassifern railway line (Queensland's first branch railway line) opened from Ipswich to Harrisville on 10 July 1882. On 12 September 1887 the line was extended to Dugundan with Boonah being served by Boonah railway station in Yeates Avenue (27.9969°S 152.6816°E). The line closed in June 1964. There is a memorial to the railway line in Yeates Avenue at the back of the Commercial Hotel (27.99714°S 152.68176°E). The town takes its name from the railway station and is an Aboriginal word referring either to the Bloodwood tree (Eucalyptus Corymbosa) or the Brigalow tree (Acacia harpadhylla).

In 1882, the Primitive Methodist Church congregation had grown too large to continue to use the Provisional School. Thomas Hardcastle donated 1 acre (0.40 ha) of land for a church on Old Mount Alford Road near the former Dugandan Bridge. There was a ceremonial cutting of the first sod on Saturday 23 December 1882 by Miss Jessie Hardcastle. The church was 22 by 14 feet (6.7 by 4.3 m) and built by George Beverley and T. Austin. It was officially opened on 4 November 1883. In 1892 concerns about flooding led to fundraising to relocate the church to the southern end of High Street in Boonah (now the location of the manse). Eventually that church building became too small for the congregation so a new church was built at 9 Church Street (27.9989°S 152.6828°E) and was officially opened on Sunday 10 November 1907. In 1908 the old church building was relocated to Kalbar. Following the amalgamation of the Methodist Church into the Uniting Church in Australia, a new Uniting Church building was built at 10 Macquarie Street (28.0015°S 152.6881°E). The church building in Church Street was sold to the Salvation Army and was subsequently sold into private ownership.

Around 1884, the Blumbergville Post Office was opened.

In 1887, the railway line from Ipswich was extended to the area, with the name Boonah given to a rail siding at Blumbergville located one stop before the terminus at the settlement of nearby Dugandan. The railway siding took its name from an Aboriginal word from the Yuggera and Yugumbir language groups meaning bloodwood tree (Corymbia gummifera) or Brigalow tree (Acacia harpophylla).

The local government, the Goolman Division, had its office in Flinders, but the coming of the railway to Boonah resulted in the relocation of the Goolman Division to Boonah in 1888.

Following devastating floods in 1887, the main commercial interests for the district relocated from the lower lying Dugandan, near the railway terminus, to the higher ground of Boonah.

The Post Office was renamed Boonah around 1888.

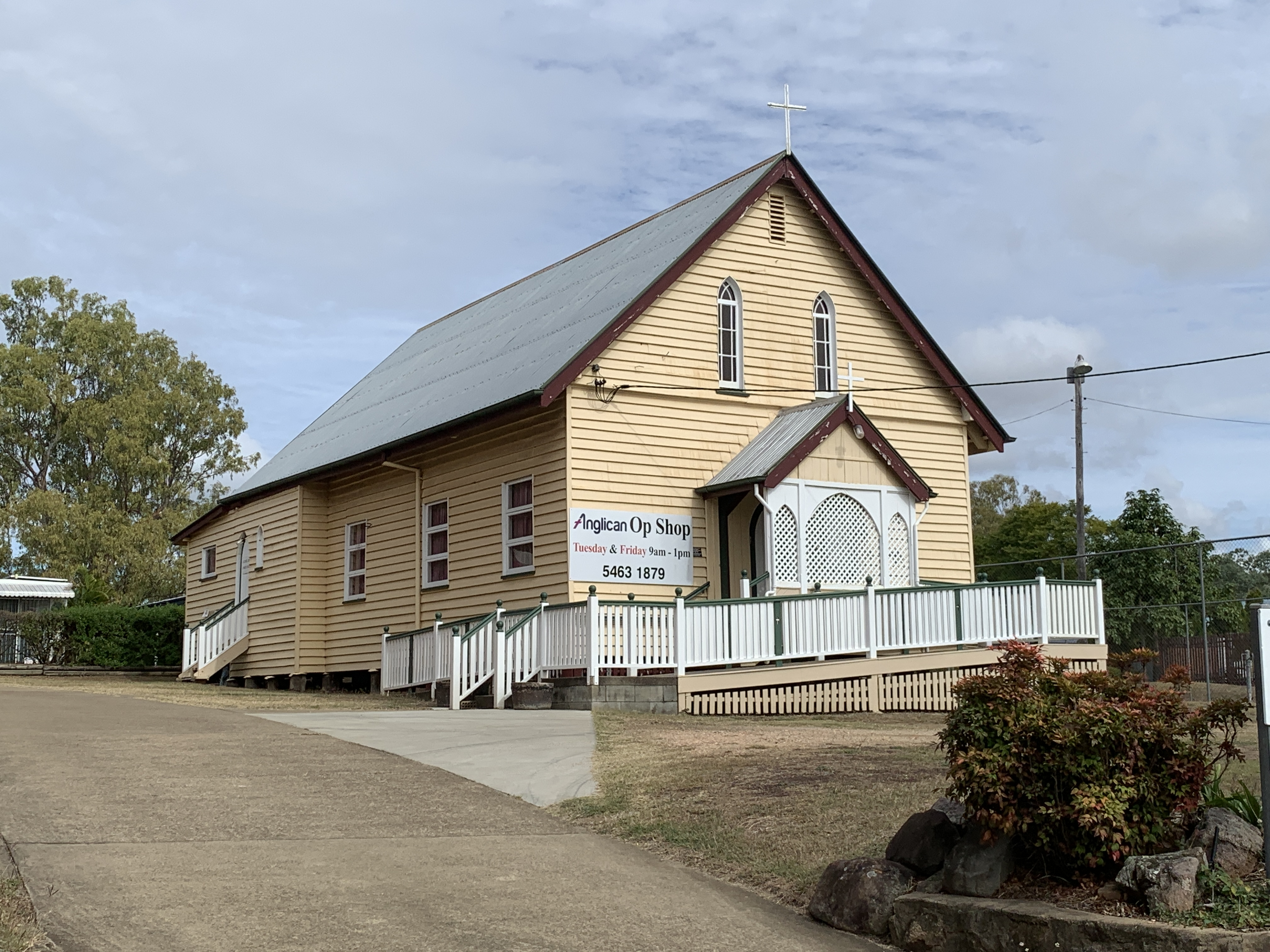
Former Christ Church Anglican (now church hall), 2020

Christ Church, a Church of England, was officially opened on 26 May 1890 by Archbishop William Webber assisted by Rev James Coles, rector at Harrisville. The church was designed by John H. Buckeridge. (the diocesan architect for the Anglican Diocese of Brisbane) and built by Mr Vincent of Boonah. Prior to the opening of the church, Church of England services were held in the Goolman Divisional Board office. At the time of the opening of the church, there was no permanent minister. On 7 July 1956 Archbishop Reginald Halse set a stone in the second church building being erected dedicating the new church as a memorial to the martyrs of the New Guinea Mission and those who died in World War I, World War II and the Korean War. The second church as dedicated in 1960 and consecrated in 1961. The original church continues to be used as a church hall.

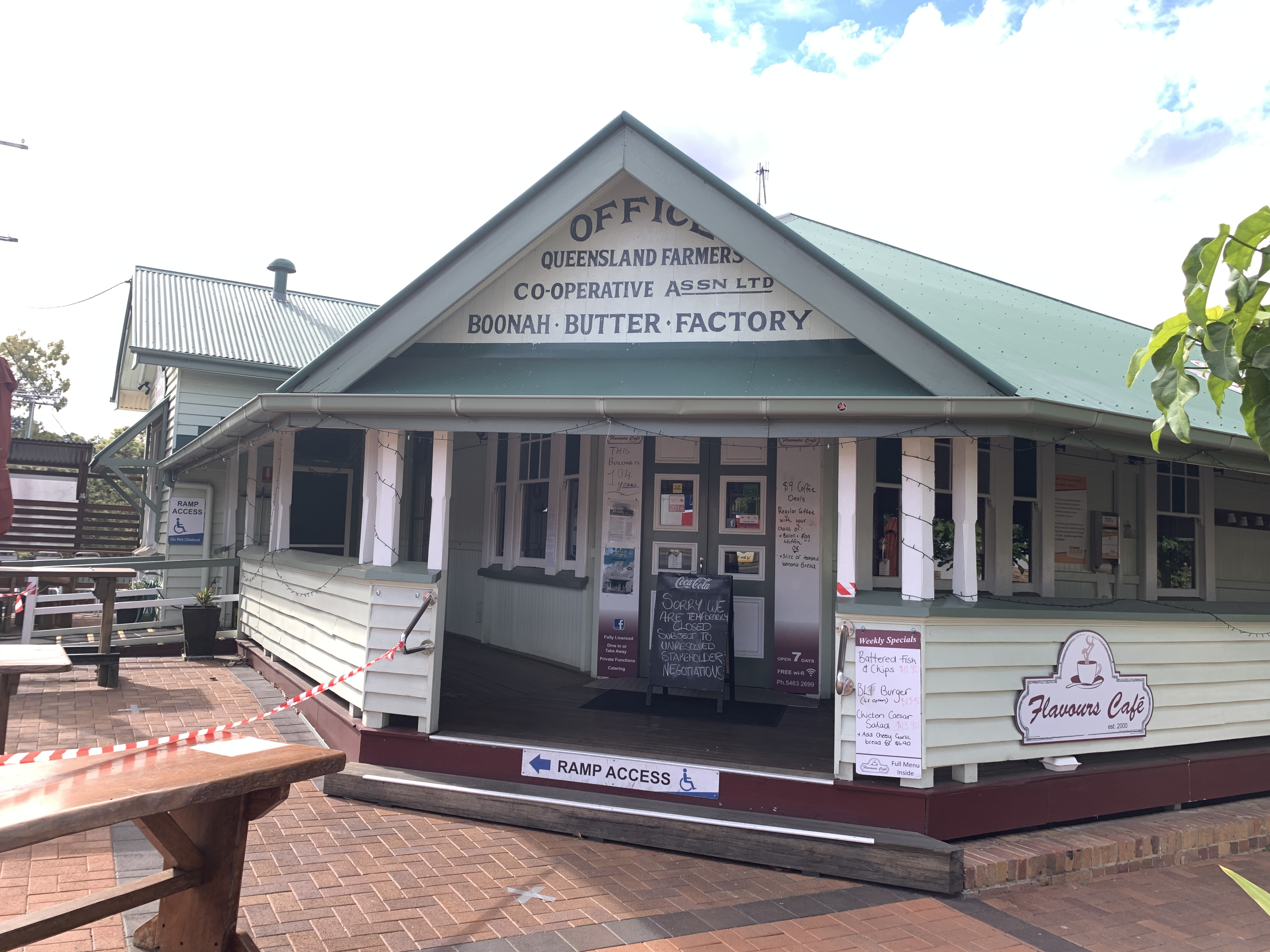
Former offices of the Boonah Butter Factory, now Flavours Cafe, 2020

By the end of 1900, the Fassifern Butter Factory owned by Mr. S. Dover was operating in Church Street. On 5 July 1916 a larger state-of-the-art factory with a separate office building, known as the Boonah Butter Factory was officially opened on a new site on the northern entry to the town by the Queensland Governor Hamilton Goold-Adams. The Boonah Butter Factory closed on 1 March 1974 due to declining production as a result of low prices for milk and shifting agricultural practices in the region.

Miss Esme Clarke's Private School opened in 1905 in a room was rented from All Saints Church. It closed in 1910.

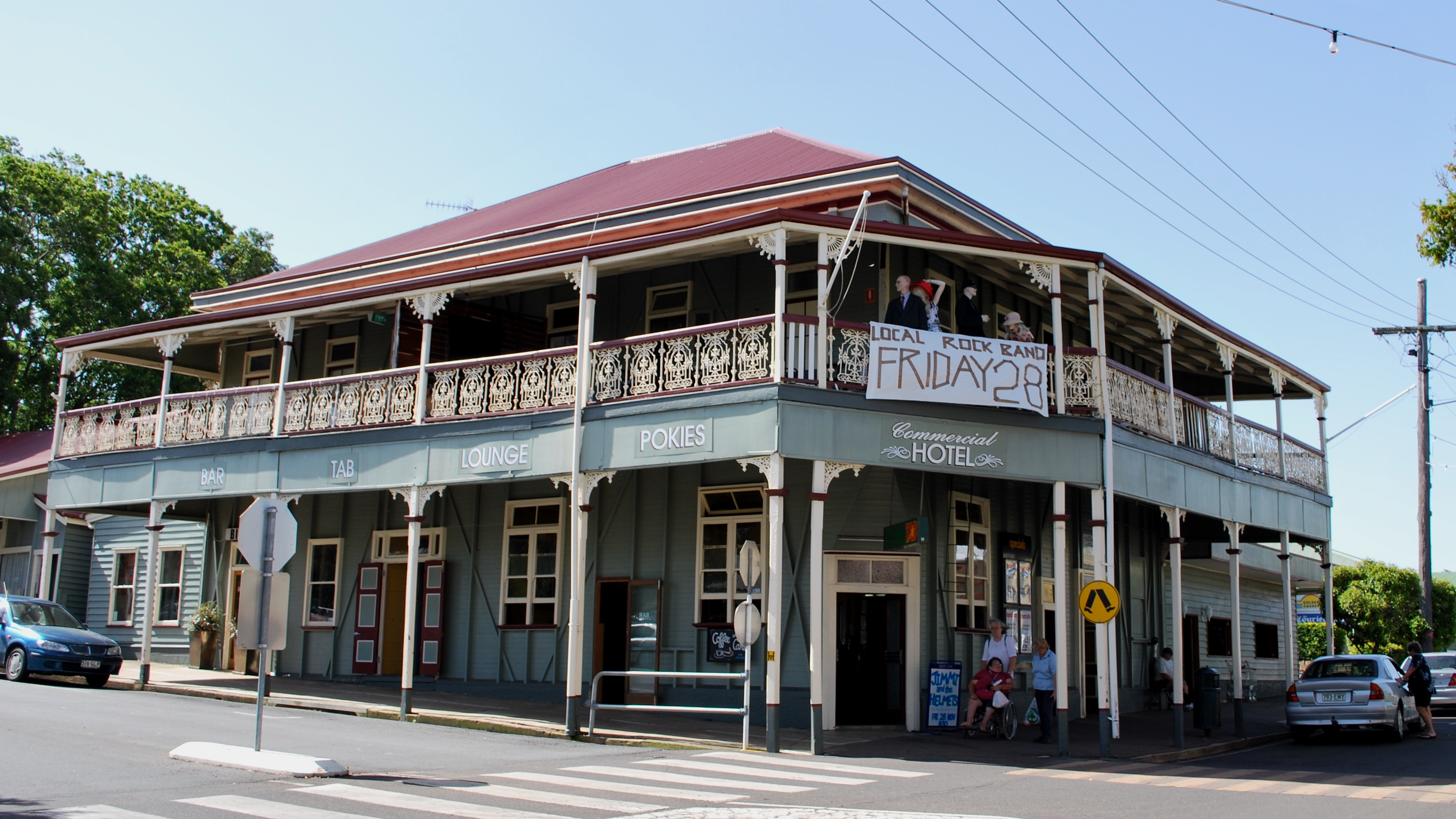
Commercial Hotel, 2008

In April 1905, John Carl Streiner opened his Commercial Hotel on the north-west corner of High Street and Park Street. It was a two-storey building with filigree lace balustrading on the upper verandah. Streiner had formerly operated the Royal Exchange Hotel (previously known as the Dugandan Hotel, not to be confused with the current hotel of that name in Dugandan). Carl Behncken leased and operated the new hotel.

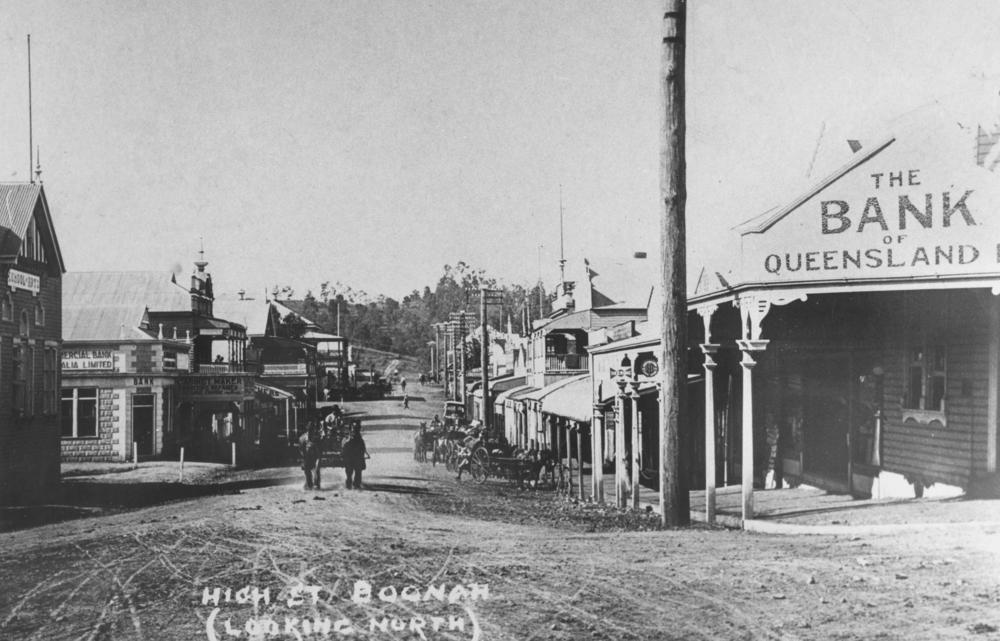
High Street, Boonah, circa 1917

The Goolman Shire War Memorial was unveiled in Boonah (then part of the Goolman Shire) on 19 May 1920 by General Birdwood and Councillor Alexander John Tait McKay. It is generally known as the Boonah War Memorial.

Initially only a primary school, Boonah State School had a secondary class added in February 1955, which it retained until 25 January 1965 when Boonah State High School opened.

All Saints' Catholic Primary School was constructed in 1956 using volunteer labour. It was officially opened on 4 November 1956 by Archbishop James Duhig. It was operated by the Sisters of Mercy until 1989 when it passed to the lay leadership of principal Kathleen Lambourne.

Boonah was the centre of the Shire of Boonah local government area until council amalgamations occurred in 2008.

== Demographics ==
In the 2016 census, the locality of Boonah had a population of 2,484 people. The locality contains 1,206 households, in which 47.2% of the population are males and 52.8% of the population are females with a median age of 46, 8 years above the national average. The average weekly household income is $950, $488 below the national average. 2.1% of Boonah's population is either of Aboriginal or Torres Strait Islander descent. 59.7% of the population aged 15 or over is either registered or de facto married, while 40.3% of the population is not married. 25.4% of the population is currently attending some form of a compulsory education. The most common nominated ancestries were English (29.8%), Australian (28.1%) and German (12.8%), while the most common country of birth was Australia (82.3%), and the most commonly spoken language at home was English (90.1%). The most common nominated religions were No religion (22.9%), Catholic (19.2%) and Anglican (16.9%). The most common occupation was a labourer (21.7%) and the majority/plurality of residents worked 40 or more hours per week (41.4%).

In the 2021 census, the locality of Boonah had a population of 2,557 people.

== Heritage listings ==
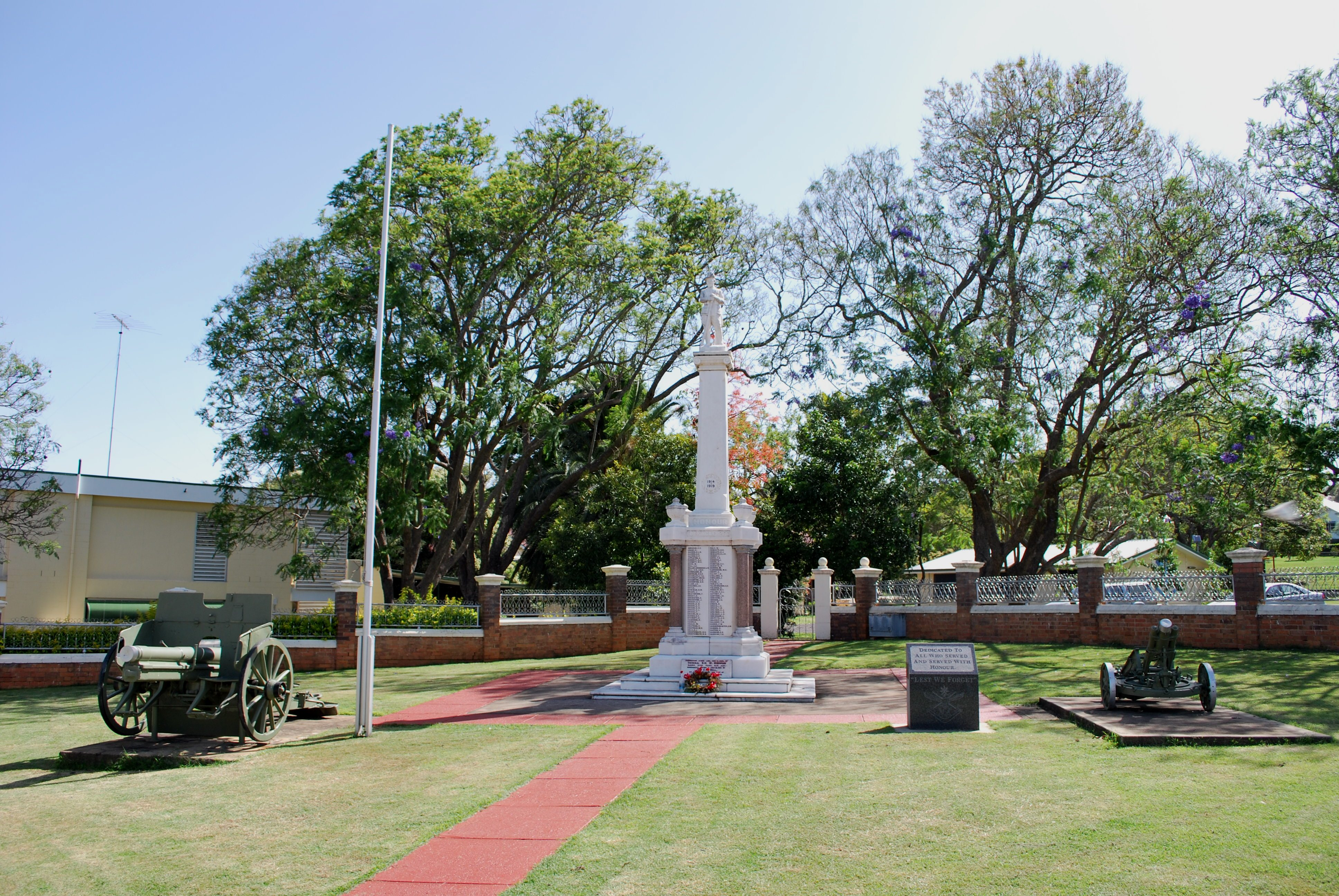
Boonah war memorial, 2008

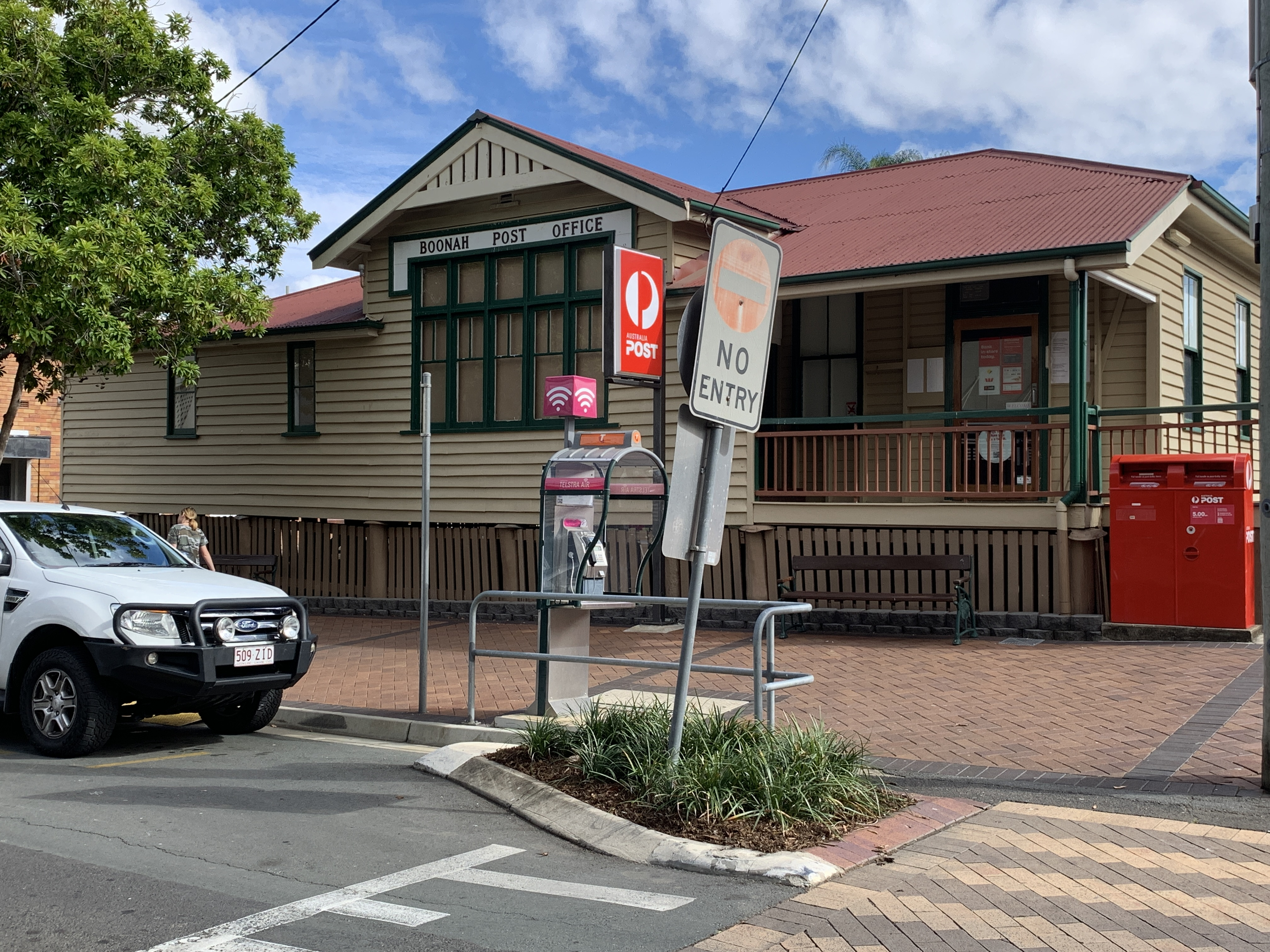
Boonah Post Office, 2020

Boonah has a number of heritage-listed sites, including:

- Christ Church Anglican, 8–10 Church Street (27.9992°S 152.6832°E)
- Boonah Showgrounds, Cossart Street and Macquarie Street (27.9975°S 152.6868°E)
- Australian Hotel, 32 High Street (27.9979°S 152.6823°E)
- Commercial Hotel, 39 High Street and Yeates Avenue (27.9972°S 152.6821°E)
- Coochin Coochin Homestead, J Bell Road, Coochin via Boonah
- Boonah War Memorial and Memorial Park, Park Street (27.9973°S 152.6811°E)
- Boonah Post Office, 1 Park Street (27.9974°S 152.6820°E)
- former offices of the Qld Farmers Co-operative Association Boonah Butter Factory (now home to Flavour's Café), 8 Railway Street (27.9956°S 152.6819°E)

== Economy ==
The area produces vegetables for the nearby Brisbane Markets notably carrots, potatoes, and cereal crops. Beef, pork and timber are also produced locally. In the 2000–01 financial year the Shire of Boonah produced $67 million worth of agricultural products. More than 135,000 hectares of farmland were used to produce about $20 million worth of crops and $46 million from livestock. Vegetables accounted for more than 20% of agricultural products in the area. The main crops were carrots, French and runner beans, lucerne and potatoes. The shire produced 7% of the state's hay and 8% of the state's soybeans. Dairy cows, meat cattle, meat chicken and pigs were the main livestock commodities, producing 1% of the total value of the state's production in these commodities. Nearly two-thirds of the recorded food and fibre businesses in the Boonah area produced beef cattle. More than 180 farms used irrigation. The town has a local office of Primary Industries.

== Education ==
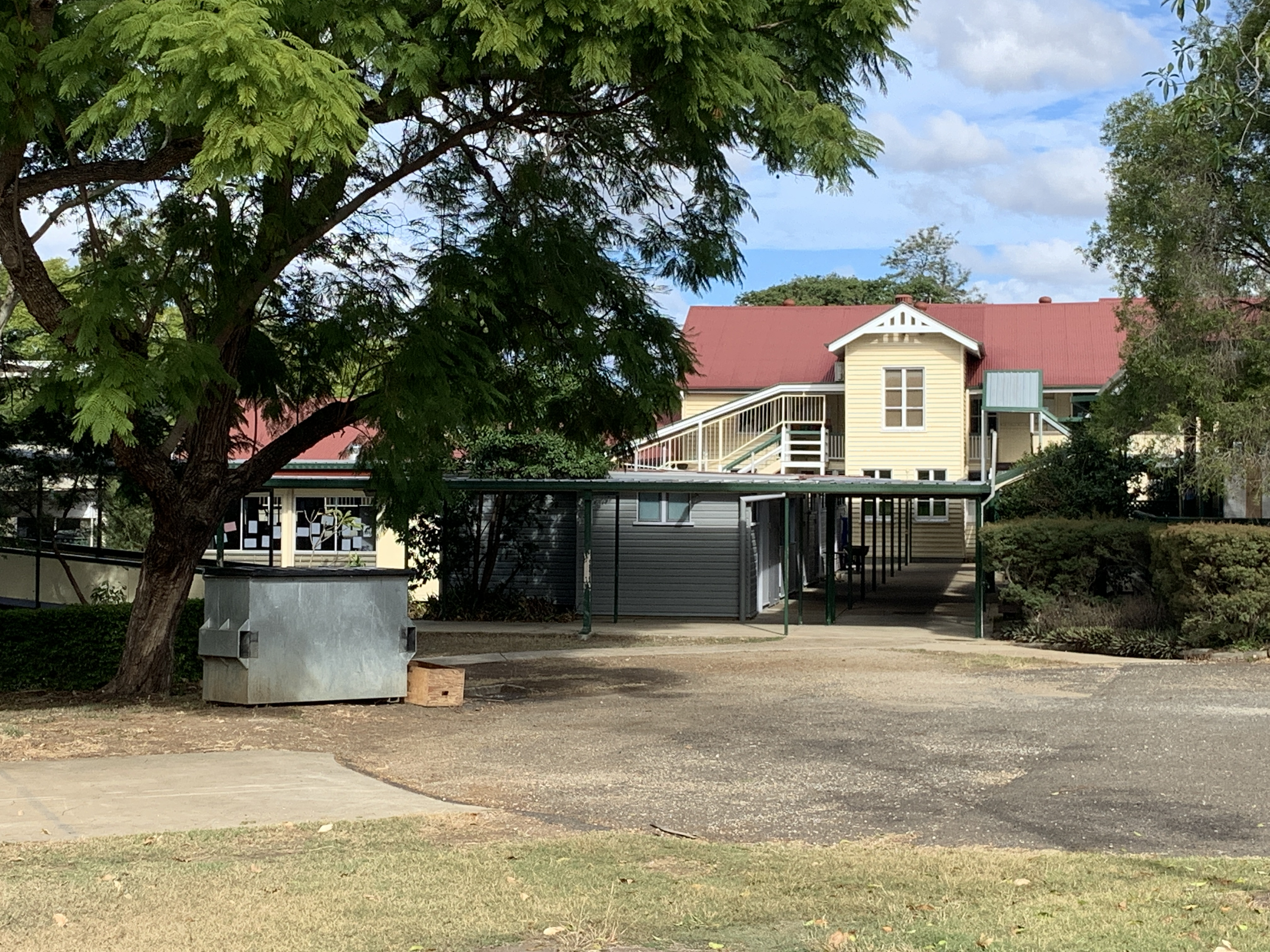
Boonah State School, 2020.jpg

Boonah State School is a government primary (Prep–6) school for boys and girls at Park Street (27.9977°S 152.6811°E). In 2018, the school had an enrolment of 231 students with 22 teachers (18 full-time equivalent) and 16 non-teaching staff (10 full-time equivalent). It includes a special education program.

All Saints' School is a Catholic primary (Prep–6) school for boys and girls at 15 Oliver Street (28.0003°S 152.6864°E). In 2018, the school had an enrolment of 181 students with 15 teachers (12 full-time equivalent) and 9 non-teaching staff (6 full-time equivalent).

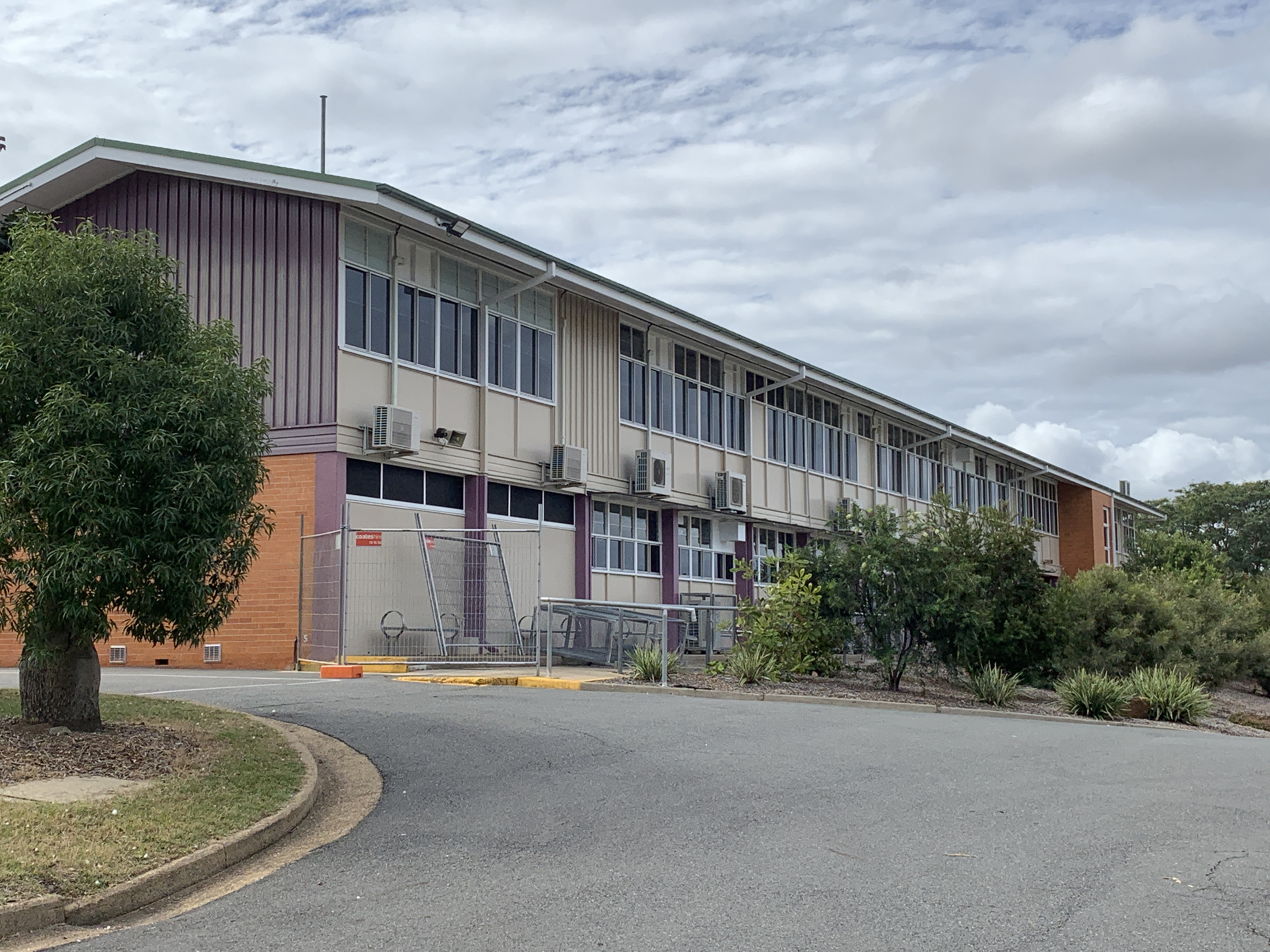
Boonah State High School, 2020

Boonah State High School is a government secondary (7–12) school for boys and girls at 32 Macquarie Street (27.9954°S 152.6891°E). In 2018, the school had an enrolment of 658 students with 60 teachers (57 full-time equivalent) and 30 non-teaching staff (21 full-time equivalent). It includes a special education program.

The Bremer Institute of TAFE had a campus at Boonah, which operated at limited functionality for several years due to cutbacks. Bremer has since merged into TAFE South Queensland and the Boonah campus was closed.

== Media ==
The town is serviced by the daily newspaper The Queensland Times and the weekly newspaper The Fassifern Guardian.

== Amenities ==
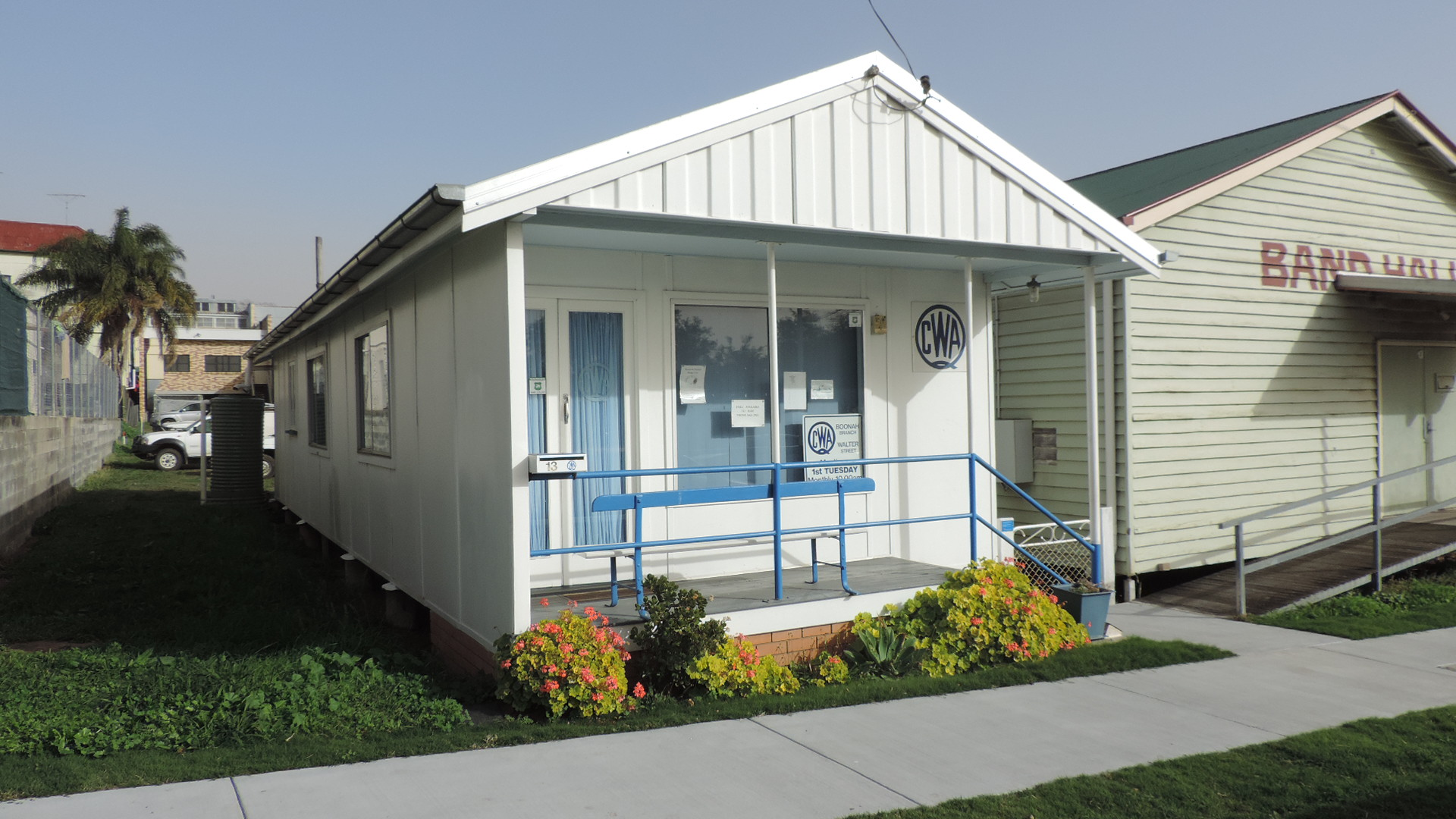
Boonah CWA, 2020

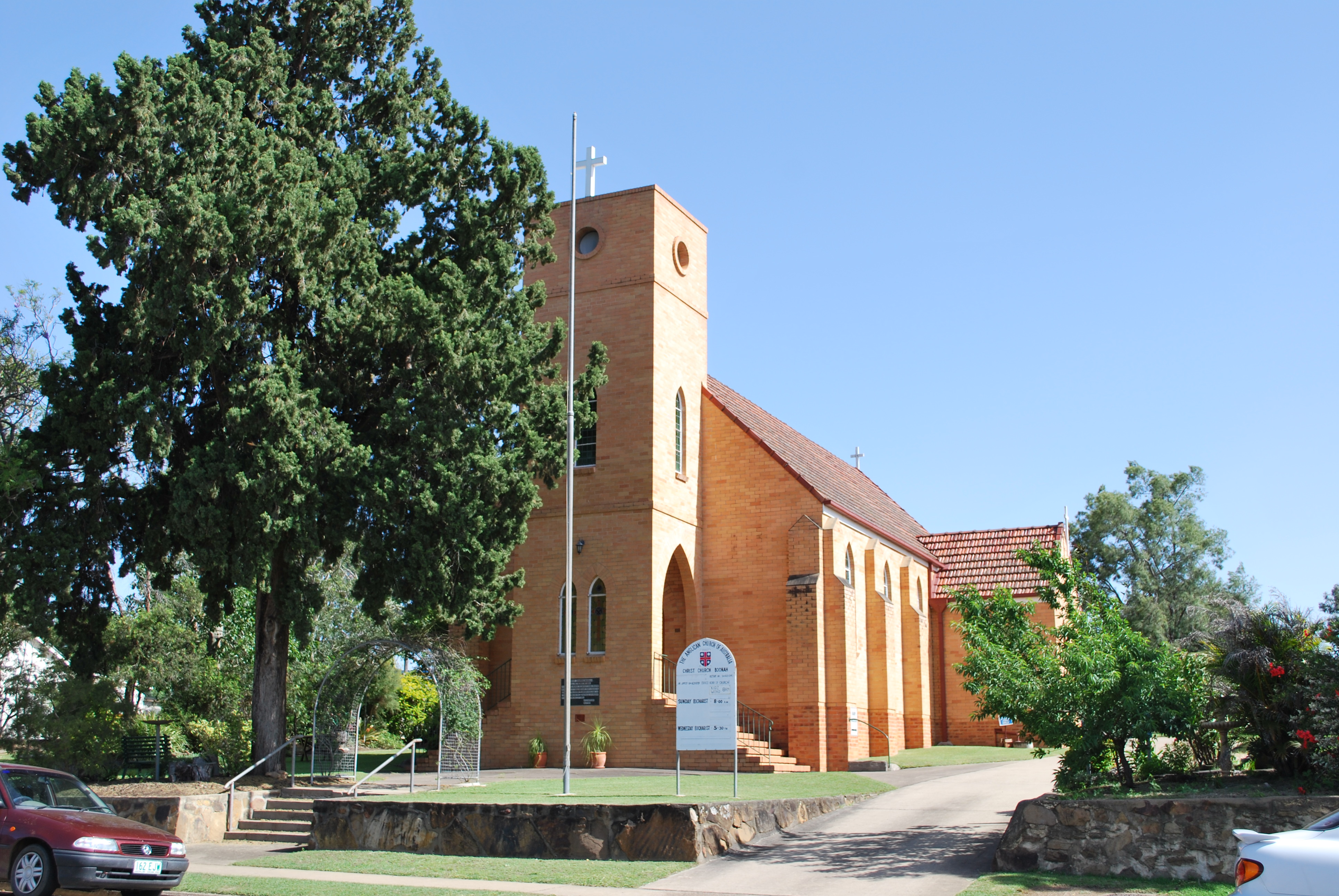
Christ Church Anglican, 2008

The Scenic Rim Regional Council operates a public library at 3 High Street (27.9985°S 152.6818°E).

The Boonah branch of the Queensland Country Women's Association meets at 13 Walter Street (27.9979°S 152.6832°E).

Christ Church Anglican is at 6-10 Church Street and provides services on Wednesdays and Sundays.

There are a number of parks in the locality, including:

- Bicentennial Park (27.9918°S 152.6805°E)
- Coronation Park (27.9943°S 152.6849°E)
- Cossart Street (27.9967°S 152.6852°E)
- Devin Drive Park (27.9882°S 152.6880°E)
- Dugandan Park (28.0026°S 152.6802°E)
- Springleigh Park (27.9906°S 152.6896°E)

== Attractions ==
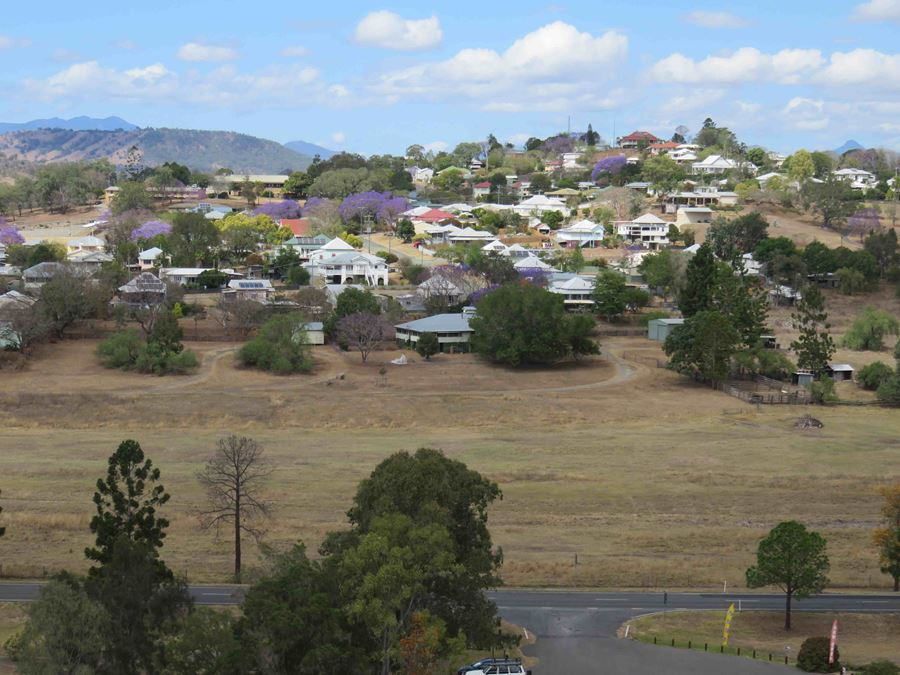
View of Boonah from the lookout, 2021

The Boonah Visitor Information Centre is in Bicentennial Park at 20 Boonah Fassifern Road (27.9925°S 152.6805°E). There is the Rotary Lookout at Bicentennial Place on the hill above the visitor information centre, opposite 28 Athol Terrace (27.9913°S 152.6813°E). The lookout provides views across the town and to the mountain peaks of the Scenic Rim.

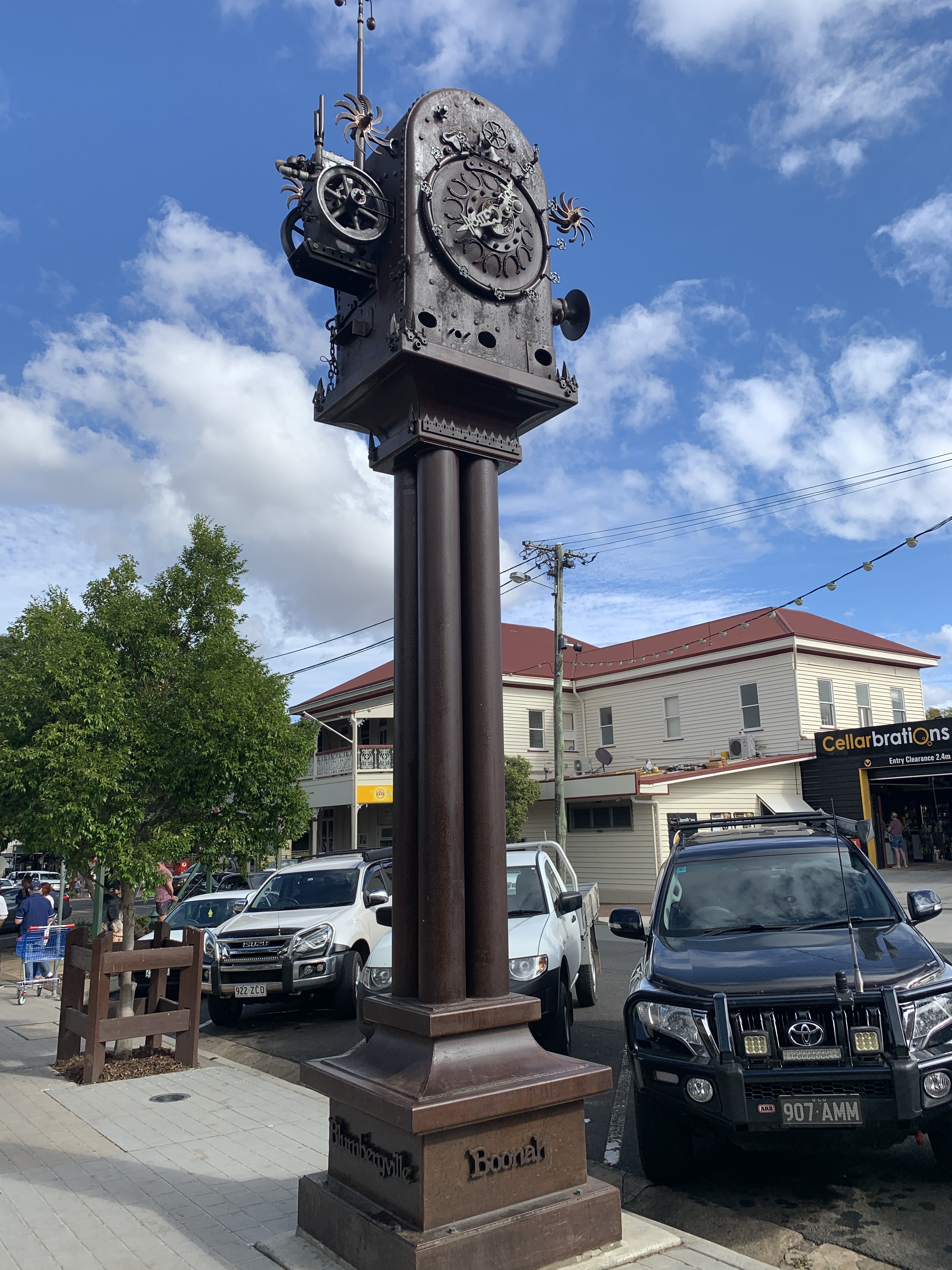
Blumbergville Clock, 2020

The Blumberville Clock on the footpath in High Street outside the Scenic Rim Regional Council offices (27.9969°S 152.6824°E) was created as a sculptural steampunk timepiece by local artist Christopher Trotter in collaboration with local clockmaker David Bland. It was commissioned by the Scenic Rim Regional Council in 2014 to honour the spirit of resilience of the community following the 2011 and 2013 floods. Blumbergville is the original name of Boonah and the work incorporates recycled elements from the 1800s. A steam whistle sounds on the hour. It is 6 metres (20 ft) tall and weighs 5 tonnes (5.5 tons).

The former Boonah Butter Factory at 10 Railway Street (27.9954°S 152.6814°E) now houses an art space and a fruit-and-vegetable store. Its former office building at 8 Railway Street (27.9957°S 152.6819°E) is now the Flavours Café.

== Climate ==
Boonah experiences sub-tropical climatic conditions typically with warm wet summers and mild dry winters. Boonah township is approximately 80 metres (260 ft) above sea level. Average annual rainfall for the region is 866 millimetres (34.1 in), equating to an average of 89 days of rainfall. Temperatures range between daytime averages of mid thirty degrees Celsius in summer, to low twenty degrees Celsius in winter.

== See also ==
- Aratula
- Roadvale
- Kalbar
