= Limestone Ridges, Queensland =

Limestone Ridges
- Suburb
- Interactive map of Limestone Ridges
- Coordinates: 27.8338°S 152.7247°E
- Country: Australia
- State: Queensland
- LGA: Scenic Rim Region
- Location: 22.2 km (13.8 mi) SSW of Boonah; 26.4 km (16.4 mi) S of Ipswich CBD; 46.8 km (29.1 mi) NW of Beaudesert; 64.6 km (40.1 mi) SW of Brisbane CBD

Government
  - State electorate: Scenic Rim
  - Federal division: Wright

Area
  - Total: 13.8 km^{2} (5.3 sq mi)

Population
  - Total: 135 (2021 census)
  - Density: 9.78/km^{2} (25.34/sq mi)
- Time zone: UTC+10:00 (AEST)
- Postcode: 4305
Suburbs around Limestone Ridges
Peak Crossing	Peak Crossing	Peak Crossing
Harrisville	Limestone Ridges	Washpool
Milora	Milbong	Milbong

Limestone Ridges is a rural locality in the Scenic Rim Region, Queensland, Australia. In the 2021 census, Limestone Ridges had a population of 135 people.

== Geography ==
Ipswich – Boonah Road (State Route 93) runs along the eastern boundary. Limestone Ridges Road is the main north-south road through the locality.

The land use is predominantly grazing on native vegetation with some crop growing and some mining.

== History ==
The name Limestone Ridges refers from an outcrop now mined for dolomite.

Limestone Ridges Provisional School opened on 11 November 1884. On 1 April 1910, it became Limestone Ridges State School. It closed on 3 May 1974. It was at 335 Limestone Ridges Road (27.8301°S 152.7295°E).

== Demographics ==
In the 2016 census, Limestone Ridges had a population of 116 people. The locality contains 41 households, in which 51.7% of the population are males and 48.3% of the population are females with a median age of 45, 7 years above the national average. The average weekly household income is $1,437, $1 below the national average.

In the 2021 census, Limestone Ridges had a population of 135 people.

== Education ==
There are no schools in Limestone Ridges. The nearest government primary schools are Peak Crossing State School in neighbouring Peak Crossing to the north, Harrisville State School in neighbouring Harrisville to the west, and Roadvale State School in Roadvale to the south. The nearest government secondary schools are Bremer State High School in Ipswich CBD to the north and Boonah State High School in Boonah to the south.
