= Washpool, Queensland =

Washpool
- Suburb
- Interactive map of Washpool
- Coordinates: 27.8372°S 152.7675°E
- Country: Australia
- State: Queensland
- LGA: Scenic Rim Region
- Location: 28.5 km (17.7 mi) S of Ipswich; 28.6 km (17.8 mi) NNE of Boonah; 53.2 km (33.1 mi) NW of Beaudesert; 66.7 km (41.4 mi) SW of Brisbane

Government
  - State electorate: Scenic Rim
  - Federal division: Wright

Area
  - Total: 19.5 km^{2} (7.5 sq mi)

Population
  - Total: 101 (2021 census)
  - Density: 5.18/km^{2} (13.41/sq mi)
- Time zone: UTC+10:00 (AEST)
- Postcode: 4306
Suburbs around Washpool
Peak Crossing	Peak Crossing	Peak Crossing
Limestone Ridges	Washpool	Undullah
Milbong	Woolooman	Woolooman

Washpool is a rural locality in the Scenic Rim Region, Queensland, Australia. In the 2021 census, Washpool had a population of 101 people.

== Geography ==
Mount Welcome (27.8325°S 152.7946°E) rises to 343 metres (1,125 ft) above sea level in the north-east of the locality.

Ipswich – Boonah Road (State Route 93) runs along the western boundary.

== Demographics ==
In the 2016 census, Washpool had a population of 95 people.

In the 2021 census, Washpool had a population of 101 people.

== Education ==
There are no schools in Washpool. The nearest government primary schools are Peak Crossing State School in neighbouring Peak Crossing to the north and Roadvale State School in Roadvale to the south. The nearest government secondary schools are Boonah State High School in Boonah to the south-west, Bremer State High School in Ipswich to the north, and Flagstone State Community College in Flagstone to the north-east.
