= Anthony, Queensland =

Anthony
- Suburb
- Interactive map of Anthony
- Coordinates: 27.8805°S 152.6883°E
- Country: Australia
- State: Queensland
- LGA: Scenic Rim Region
- Location: 15.4 km (9.6 mi) NNE of Boonah; 42.9 km (26.7 mi) WNW of Beaudesert; 75.9 km (47.2 mi) SW of Brisbane
- Established: Gazetted on 30 January 2009

Government
  - State electorate: Scenic Rim
  - Federal division: Wright

Area
  - Total: 13.8 km^{2} (5.3 sq mi)

Population
  - Total: 133 (2021 census)
  - Density: 9.64/km^{2} (24.96/sq mi)
- Time zone: UTC+10:00 (AEST)
- Postcode: 4310
Suburbs around Anthony
Milora	Milora	Milbong
Munbilla	Anthony	Milbong
Munbilla	Blantyre	Roadvale

Anthony is a rural locality in the Scenic Rim Region, Queensland, Australia. In the 2021 census, Anthony had a population of 133 people.

== Geography ==
The Roadvale Harrisville Road traverses the locality from south-east (Roadvale) to the north-east (Milora/Milbong).

The creeks that rise in the locality contribute to the Bremer River, a tributary of the Brisbane River which flows into Moreton Bay.

The principal land use is grazing with some cropping.

== History ==
The locality takes its name from the Anthony railway station, which in turn was named circa 1887 after a local resident.

The Fassifern railway line (Queensland's first branch railway line) opened from Ipswich to Harrisville on 10 July 1882. On 12 September 1887 the line was extended to Dugundan with the Anthony district being served by Anthony railway station (27.8836°S 152.6731°E). The line closed in June 1964.

== Demographics ==
In the 2016 census, Anthony had a population of 111 people. The locality contains 40 households, in which 45.4% of the population are males and 54.6% of the population are females with a median age of 43, 5 above the national average. The average weekly household income is $1,531, $93 above the national average.

In the 2021 census, Anthony had a population of 133 people.

== Education ==
There are no schools in Anthony. The nearest government primary schools are Roadvale State School in neighbouring Roadvale to the south-east and Harrisville State School in Harrisville. The nearest government secondary school is Boonah State High School in Boonah.
