= Woolooman, Queensland =

Woolooman
- Suburb
- Interactive map of Woolooman
- Coordinates: 27.8741°S 152.7680°E
- Country: Australia
- State: Queensland
- LGA: Scenic Rim Region
- Location: 23.9 km (14.9 mi) NNE of Boonah; 35.5 km (22.1 mi) S of Ipswich; 47.2 km (29.3 mi) NW of Beaudesert; 74.6 km (46.4 mi) SW of Brisbane CBD

Government
  - State electorate: Scenic Rim
  - Federal division: Wright

Area
  - Total: 16.9 km^{2} (6.5 sq mi)

Population
  - Total: 33 (2021 census)
  - Density: 1.95/km^{2} (5.06/sq mi)
- Time zone: UTC+10:00 (AEST)
- Postcode: 4310
Suburbs around Woolooman
Washpool	Washpool	Washpool
Milbong	Woolooman	Undullah
Milbong	Wyaralong	Undullah

Woolooman is a rural locality in the Scenic Rim Region, Queensland, Australia. In the 2021 census, Woolooman had a population of 33 people.

== History ==
Woolooman Provisional School opened on 9 March 1908 under headteacher W. M. Howe. On 1 January 1909, it became Woolooman State School. It closed in 1913 due to low attendances. The school re-opened in a new building on 21 August 1933 as Woolooman State School. It closed permanently in 1937. In 1941, it was planned to move the school building to Woodhill State School, but evidently this did not occur as in 1946, the building was relocated to Nudgee Beach State School in Nudgee Beach.

== Demographics ==
In the 2016 census, Woolooman had a population of 23 people.

In the 2021 census, Woolooman had a population of 33 people.

== Education ==
There are no schools in Woolooman. The nearest government primary schools are Roadvale State School in Roadvale to the south-west and Peak Crossing State School in Peak Crossing to the north. The nearest government secondary school is Boonah State High School in Boonah to the south-west.
