= Milora, Queensland =

Milora
- Suburb
- Interactive map of Milora
- Coordinates: 27.8475°S 152.6841°E
- Country: Australia
- State: Queensland
- LGA: Scenic Rim Region
- Location: 20.1 km (12.5 mi) N of Boonah; 30.5 km (19.0 mi) SSW of Ipswich; 47.5 km (29.5 mi) NW of Beaudesert; 68.7 km (42.7 mi) SW of Brisbane CBD

Government
  - State electorate: Scenic Rim
  - Federal division: Wright

Area
  - Total: 13.4 km^{2} (5.2 sq mi)

Population
  - Total: 136 (2021 census)
  - Density: 10.15/km^{2} (26.29/sq mi)
- Time zone: UTC+10:00 (AEST)
- Postcode: 4309
Suburbs around Milora
Harrisville	Harrisville	Limestone Ridges
Wilsons Plains	Milora	Milbong
Radford	Munbilla	Anthony

Milora is a rural locality in the Scenic Rim Region, Queensland, Australia. In the 2021 census, Milora had a population of 136 people.

== History ==
Milora Wesleyan Methodist Church opened in 1869. Tenders were called in October 1869. It was opened circa January 1870, celebrating its anniversary on 21 January 1871.

Milora State School opened on 20 April 1873 and closed on 27 July 1962. It was near the north-west corner of Munbilla Road and Goames Road (approx 27.8526°S 152.6759°E).

== Demographics ==
In the 2016 census, Milora had a population of 108 people. The locality contains 38 households, in which 48.6% of the population are males and 51.4% of the population are females with a median age of 51, 13 years above the national average. The average weekly household income is $1,218, $220 below the national average.

In the 2021 census, Milora had a population of 136 people.

== Education ==
There are no schools in Milora. The nearest government primary school is Harrisville State School in neighbouring Harrisville to the north-west, Peak Crossing State School in Peak Crossing to the north-east, and Roadvale State School in Roadvale to the south-east. The nearest government secondary school is Boonah State High School in Boonah to the south.
