= Wyaralong, Queensland =

Wyaralong
- Suburb
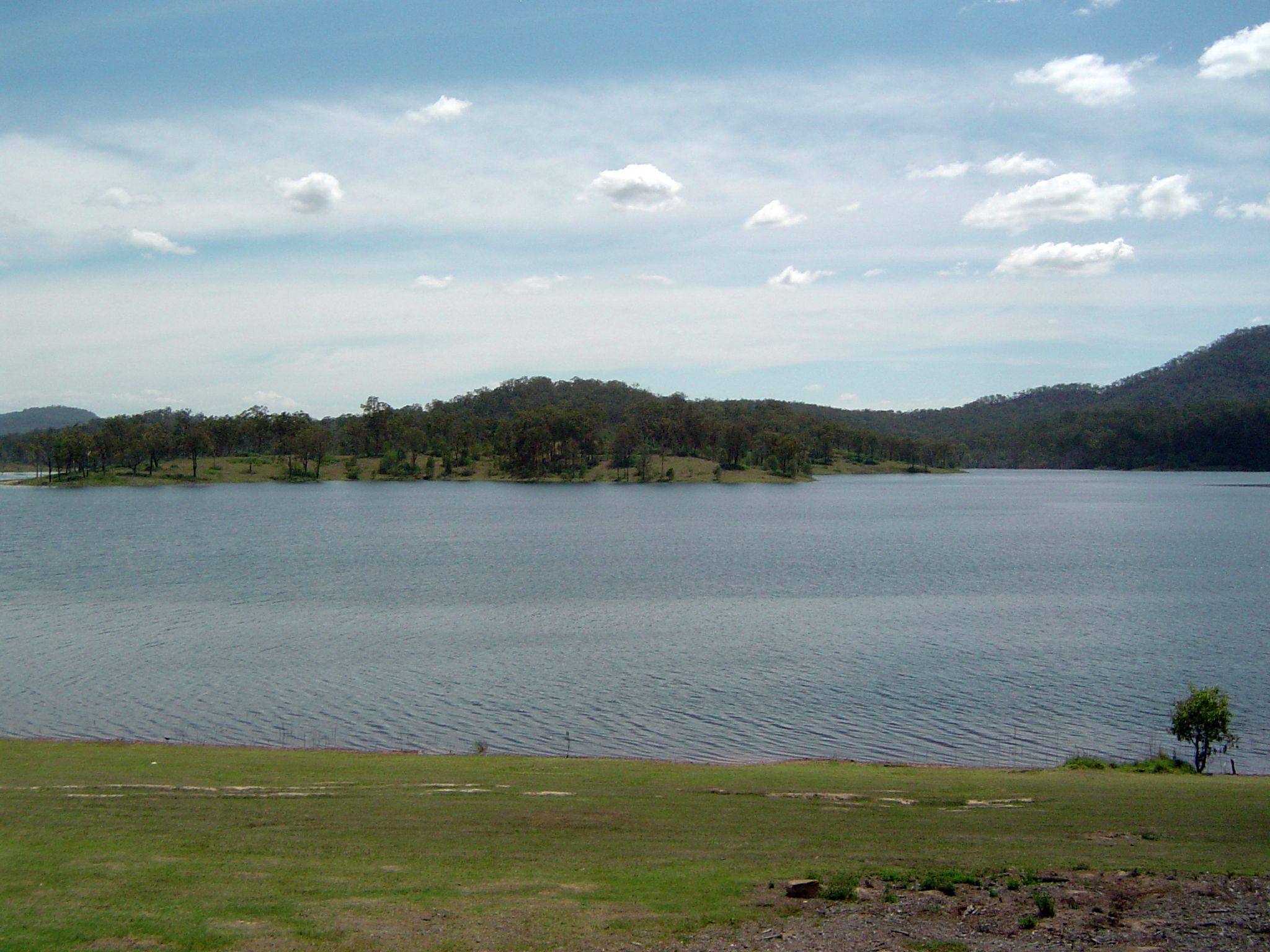
- The opposite bank of the Wyaralong Dam is in Wyaralong

- Interactive map of Wyaralong
- Coordinates: 27.9277°S 152.8180°E
- Country: Australia
- State: Queensland
- LGA: Scenic Rim Region
- Location: 17.7 km (11.0 mi) NE of Boonah; 21.9 km (13.6 mi) NW of Beaudesert; 90.3 km (56.1 mi) SE of Brisbane CBD

Government
  - State electorate: Scenic Rim
  - Federal division: Wright

Area
  - Total: 90.1 km^{2} (34.8 sq mi)

Population
  - Total: 18 (2021 census)
  - Density: 0.200/km^{2} (0.517/sq mi)
- Time zone: UTC+10:00 (AEST)
- Postcode: 4310
Suburbs around Wyaralong
Woolooman	Undullah	Kagaru
Milbong	Wyaralong	Allenview
Roadvale	Coulson	Bromelton

Wyaralong is a rural locality in the Scenic Rim Region, Queensland, Australia. In the 2021 census, Wyaralong had "no people or a very low population".

== Geography ==
The Wyaralong Dam was built across Teviot Brook, a tributary of the Logan River. The dam wall is partly in Wyaralong and partly in neighbouring Allenview (27.9079°S 152.8817°E). Its impoundment, Lake Wyaralong, is mostly within Wyaralong but some is within Allenview where the public access area is located. The dam wall is 463.6 metres (1,521 ft) wide. The catchment area of the dam is 546 square kilometres (211 sq mi). The dam can hold up to 102,883 megalitres (3,633.3×10^{6} cu ft) of water.

Mount Moy is in the south of the locality (27.9470°S 152.7973°E), rising to 356 metres (1,168 ft) above sea level.

The Beaudesert–Boonah Road (State Route 90) runs through the locality from south-east (Bromelton) to south (Coulson). It passes to the south of the lake.

The land use is predominantly grazing on native vegetation, except for some areas of plantation forestry.

== History ==
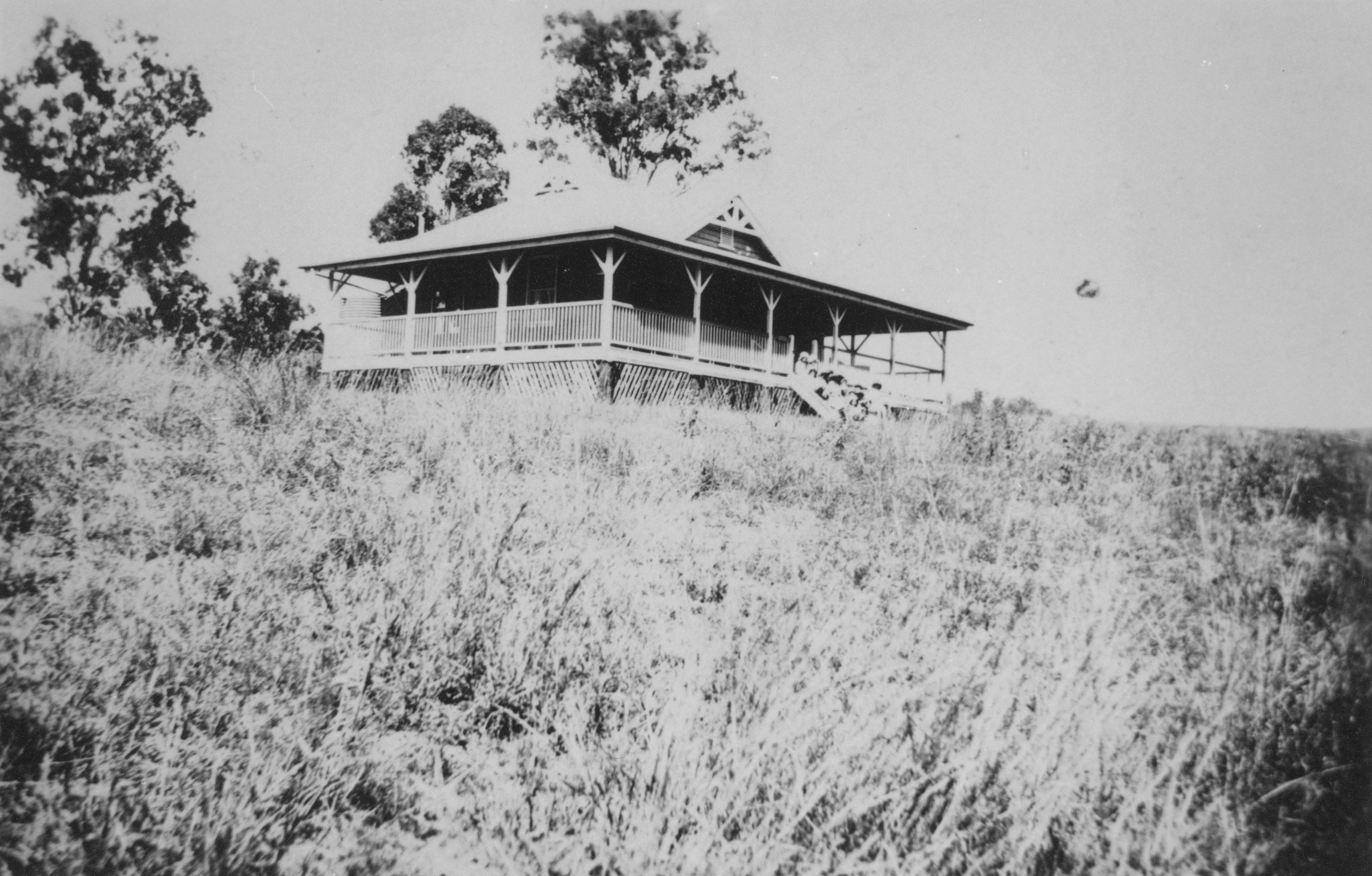
Wyaralong Provisional School at Wyaralong pastoral station, circa 1924-1929

Wyaralong Provisional School opened on 30 June 1924 but closed in 1929 due to low numbers of students. It operated from a cottage on the Wyaralong pastoral station provided by Mr and Mrs Colin John Campbell Philp.

Wyaralong State School opened on 14 February 1938. It was built on 3 acres (1.2 ha) of land donated by Colin Philp. Miss T. D. Dengle was the first teacher. The school was officially opened on Friday 11 March 1938 by Minister for Public Instruction, Frank Cooper. The school closed in 1949 but re-opened in 1956. It closed permanently on 18 July 1965. The school was located south of (the now) Old Beaudesert Road (approx 27.9430°S 152.7584°E); the route of the road between Boonah and Beaudesert has been changed to avoid the inundation created by the dam.

In 1940, the area was used for air gunnery practice exercises, the first in Queensland.

Wyaralong Dam was completed in 2011.

== Demographics ==
In the 2016 census, Wyaralong had a population of 20 people.

In the 2021 census, Wyaralong had "no people or a very low population".

== Economy ==
There are a number of homesteads in the locality:

- Alanmere (27.9426°S 152.7617°E)
- Banjora (27.9079°S 152.7620°E)
- Glen Retreal (27.9188°S 152.8130°E)
- The Overflow (27.9317°S 152.8572°E)
- Wyaralong (27.9252°S 152.8016°E)

== Education ==
There are no schools in Wyaralong. The nearest government primary schools are Roadvale State School in neighbouring Roadvale to the west, Gleneagle State School in Gleneagle to the east, and Boonah State School in Boonah to the south-west. The nearest government secondary schools are Boonah State High School in Boonah to the south-west and Beaudesert State High School in Beaudesert to the east.
