= Blantyre, Queensland =

Blantyre
- Suburb
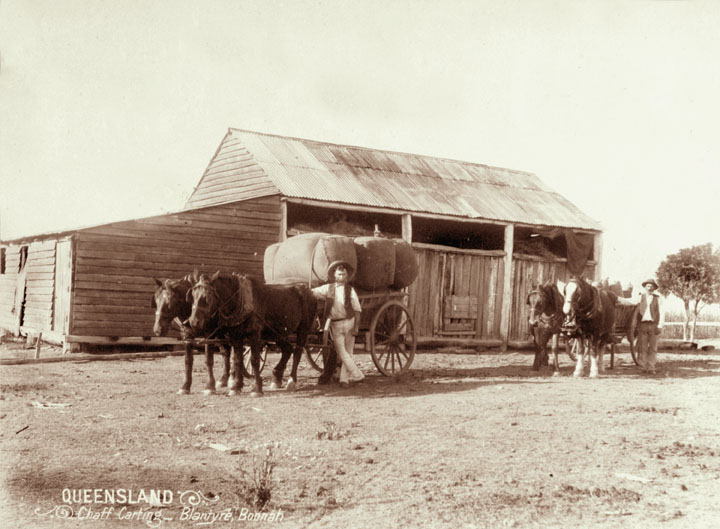
- Chaff carting at Blantyre, circa 1896

- Interactive map of Blantyre
- Coordinates: 27.9013°S 152.6775°E
- Country: Australia
- State: Queensland
- LGA: Scenic Rim Region
- Location: 13.5 km (8.4 mi) N of Boonah; 39.3 km (24.4 mi) SSW of Ipswich; 41.2 km (25.6 mi) WNW of Beaudesert; 78.4 km (48.7 mi) SW of Brisbane CBD

Government
  - State electorate: Scenic Rim
  - Federal division: Wright

Area
  - Total: 6.4 km^{2} (2.5 sq mi)

Population
  - Total: 54 (2021 census)
  - Density: 8.44/km^{2} (21.9/sq mi)
- Time zone: UTC+10:00 (AEST)
- Postcode: 4310
Suburbs around Blantyre
Anthony	Anthony	Anthony
Munbilla	Blantyre	Roadvale
Obum Obum	Roadvale	Roadvale

Blantyre is a rural locality in the Scenic Rim Region, Queensland, Australia. In the 2021 census, Blantyre had a population of 54 people.

== Geography ==
The predominant land use is grazing on native vegetation.

== History ==
The name Blantyre was originally a property name given by James Moffatt, believed to be after a Scottish town of Blantyre. Later, it was also used for a railway station (now closed).

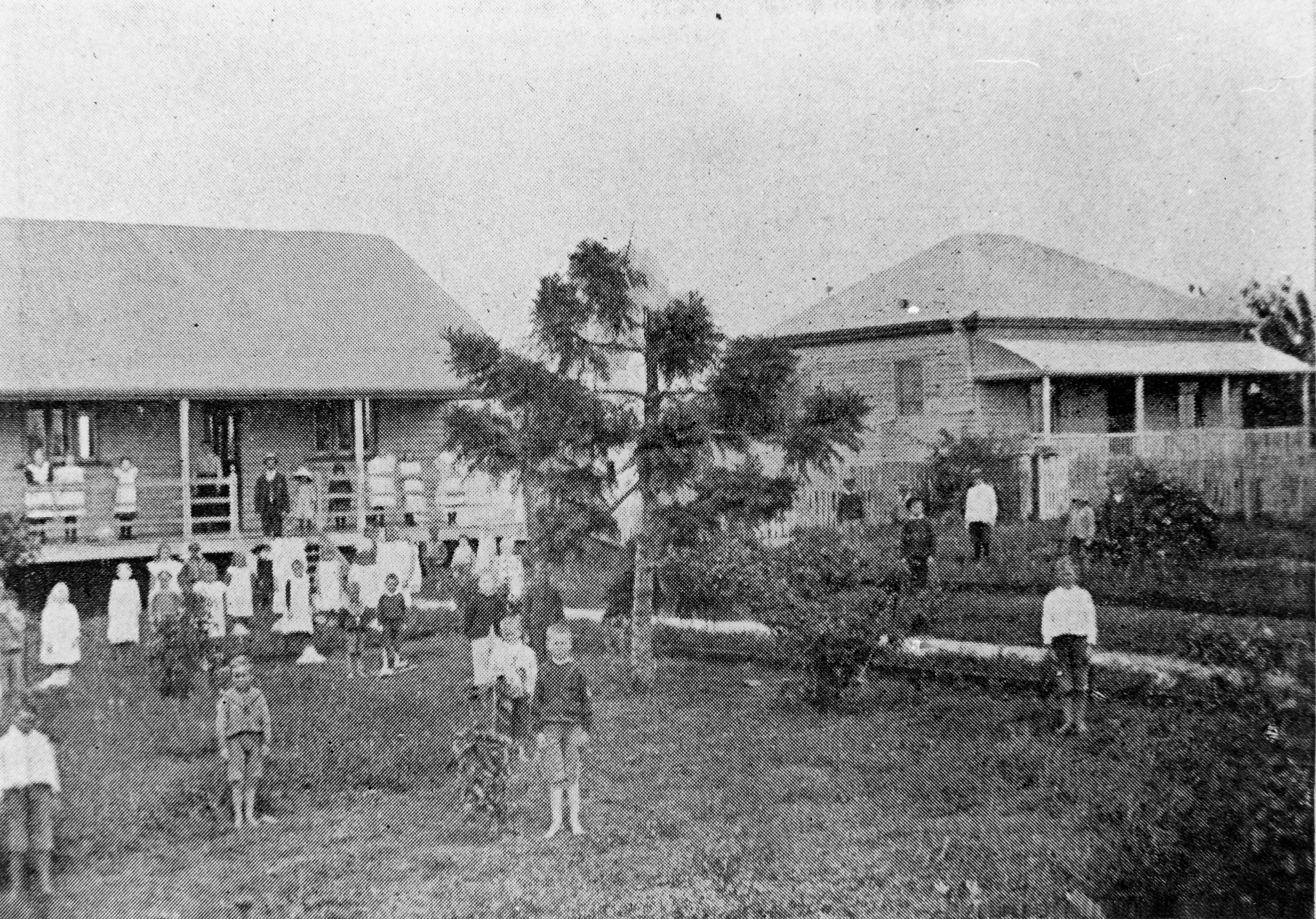
Blantyre State School, 1903

Blantyre State School opened on 28 February 1876. It closed in 1886. It reopened on 21 November 1887 as Blantyre Provisional School. On 6 July 1901, it became Blantyre State School again. It closed in 1969. It was on the western half of 107 Blantyre Road (27.9052°S 152.6844°E). Following the closure, the school building was relocated to the Laidley Pioneer Village.

The Fassifern railway line (Queensland's first branch railway line) opened from Ipswich to Harrisville on 10 July 1882. On 12 September 1887, the line was extended to Dugundan with Blantyre being served by Blantyre railway station on Blantyre Road near the junction with Greer Road (27.9056°S 152.6832°E). The line closed in June 1964.

== Demographics ==
In the 2016 census, Blantyre had a population of 59 people. The locality contained 23 households, in which 51.9% of the population were males and 48.1% of the population were females with a median age of 52, 14 years above the national average. The average weekly household income was $977, $461 below the national average.

In the 2021 census, Blantyre had a population of 54 people.

== Education ==
There are no schools in Blantyre. The nearest government primary school is Roadvale State School in neighbouring Roadvale to the south-east. The nearest government secondary school is Boonah State High School in Boonah to the south.
