= Wyaralong Dam =

Dam in south-east Queensland, Australia

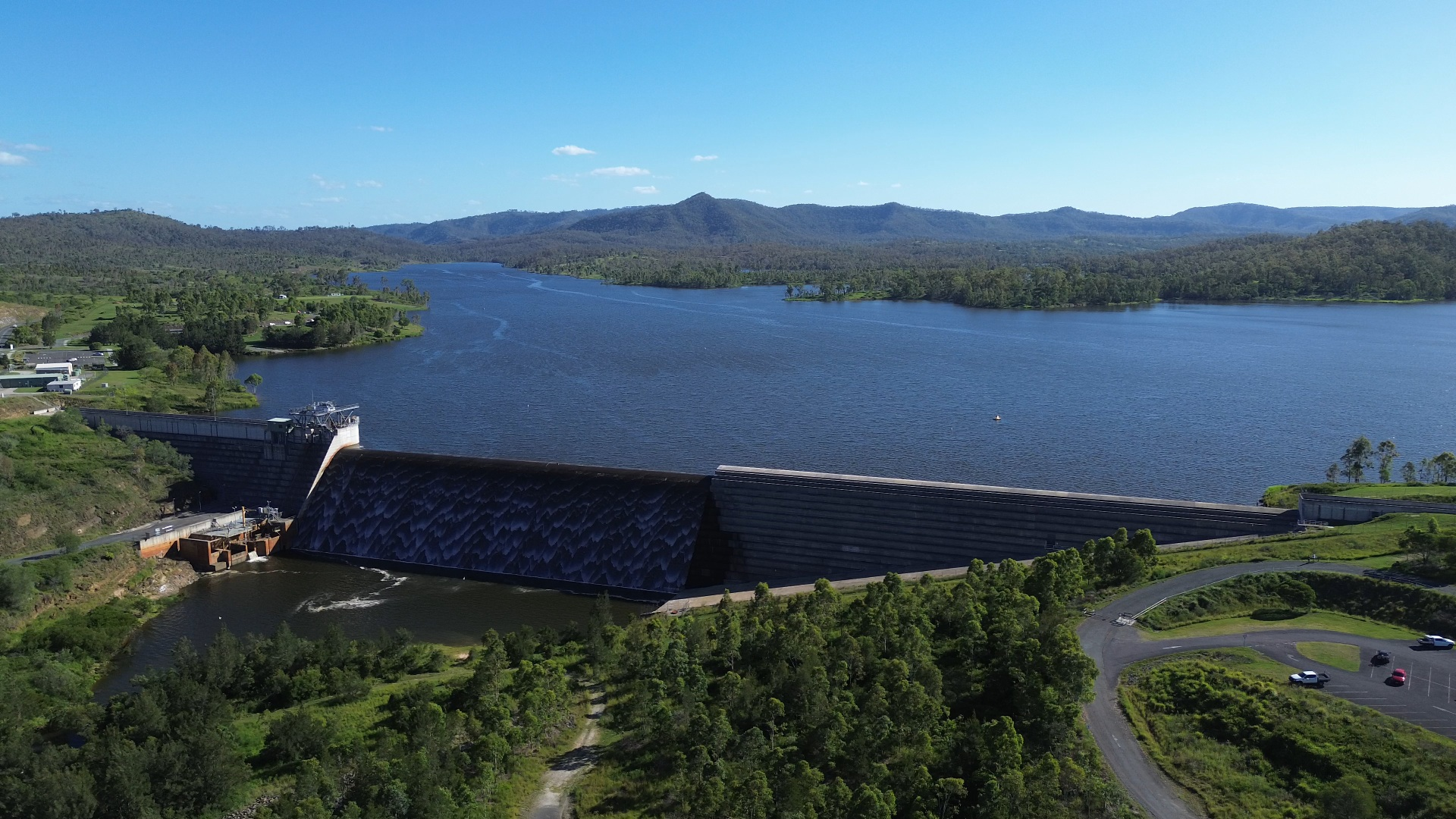
- Wyaralong Dam & Wall

- Location of the dam in Queensland
- Interactive map of Wyaralong Dam
- Country: Australia
- Location: South East Queensland
- Coordinates: 27°54′31″S 152°52′58″E
- Purpose: Water supply
- Status: Operational
- Construction began: 2010
- Opening date: 2011
- Construction cost: A$380 million
- Built by: Macmahon Constructions
- Operator: SEQ Water

Dam and spillways
- Type of dam: Gravity dam
- Impounds: Teviot Brook
- Height: 48 m (157 ft)
- Length: 490 m (1,610 ft)
- Dam volume: 218,300×10^{3} m^{3} (7,710×10^{6} cu ft)
- Spillway type: Uncontrolled

Reservoir
- Creates: Lake Wyaralong
- Total capacity: 102,883 ML (83,409 acre⋅ft)
- Catchment area: 546 km^{2} (211 sq mi)
- Surface area: 1,230 ha (3,000 acres)
- Normal elevation: 45 m (148 ft) AHD
- Website seqwater.com.au

The Wyaralong Dam is a mass concrete gravity dam across the Teviot Brook, in the South East region of Queensland, Australia. The main purpose of the dam is for supply of potable water for the Scenic Rim region. The dam was initiated by the Queensland Government in 2006 as a result of the prolonged Millennium drought which saw the catchment areas of South East Queensland's dams receive record low rain; and was completed in 2011.

== Location and features ==
The dam is approximately 14 kilometres (8.7 mi) north-west of Beaudesert. The dam wall itself is split between the localities of Wyaralong and Allenview, but the bulk of impounded water is within Wyaralong.

The Wyaralong Dam was completed prior to the 2010–2011 Queensland floods. On January 11, during the flood period, the Mayors of both Logan City and Scenic Rim said they believed that Logan had been spared a great deal of flood damage because of the dam.

The concrete dam structure is 48 metres (157 ft) high and 490 metres (1,610 ft) long. (Note: Measurements differ, depending on source. ANCOLD states 490 m (1,610 ft); while SEQ Water states 463.6 m (1,521 ft).) The dam wall is constructed from a medium cementitious mix roller compacted concrete, which is a zero-slump concrete that is placed in 300-millimetre-thick (12 in) lifts and compacted with vibratory compactors. The foundation is a sub-horizontal dipping blocky sandstone. The dam is built with a 130-metre-wide (430 ft) un-gated uncontrolled central primary spillway and an uncontrolled left bank secondary spillway which commences discharging at the 1:100 year flood level. The dam cross section is rather squat in order to provide sufficient resistance against potential sliding along foundation bedding planes. The 218,300-thousand-cubic-metre (7,710×10^{6} cu ft) dam wall holds back the reservoir that has a maximum capacity of 103,000 megalitres (84,000 acre⋅ft) when full. From a catchment area of 546 square kilometres (211 sq mi) that includes much of the western portion of the McPherson Range, the dam creates a reservoir with a surface area of 1,230 hectares (3,000 acres). Teviot Brook and the surrounding land is a recognised Aboriginal Pathway with significant cultural heritage values.

The dam is managed by SEQ Water as part of the SEQ Water Grid, a water security project. The outlet is on the right bank and is capable of abstracting water from any level of the reservoir by the use of baulks. The outlet includes an innovative and operationally complex bidirectional fish lift, which uses a single hopper to transport fish in both upstream and downstream directions.

=== Conception ===
The site was identified in a 1990 study, Water Supply Sources in South-East Queensland, as a future source of water supply for the South East Queensland region. In this report, the site of Wyaralong Dam was ranked 13th out of 15 studied possible dam locations in the region. A location on the Albert River at Glendower, also near Beaudesert, was the preferred location and the government subsequently bought back all the land required for the Glendower Dam. A new dam was not expected to be required until 2060 or later and Glendower Dam remained the preferred dam site, the land already government–owned. Properties previously acquired by the government were progressively sold to private buyers.

In October 2005, in advance of the state election, the Queensland Government announced Wyaralong Dam as the new preferred option, even after recent studies into possible dam locations found a location upstream on the Logan River to be a more reliable option. After a series of studies, a Senate Inquiry and much–contested information, in November 2008 the Federal Environment Minister, Peter Garrett, granted approval for the Wyaralong Dam.

The dam is a storage and regulation facility. It does not discharge directly into the piped reticulation network, but rather discharges back into the natural drainage network of creeks and brooks. Water released from the dam flows downstream along Teviot Brook to Cedar Grove Weir, where it is diverted for treatment and use in the piped network.

=== Construction ===
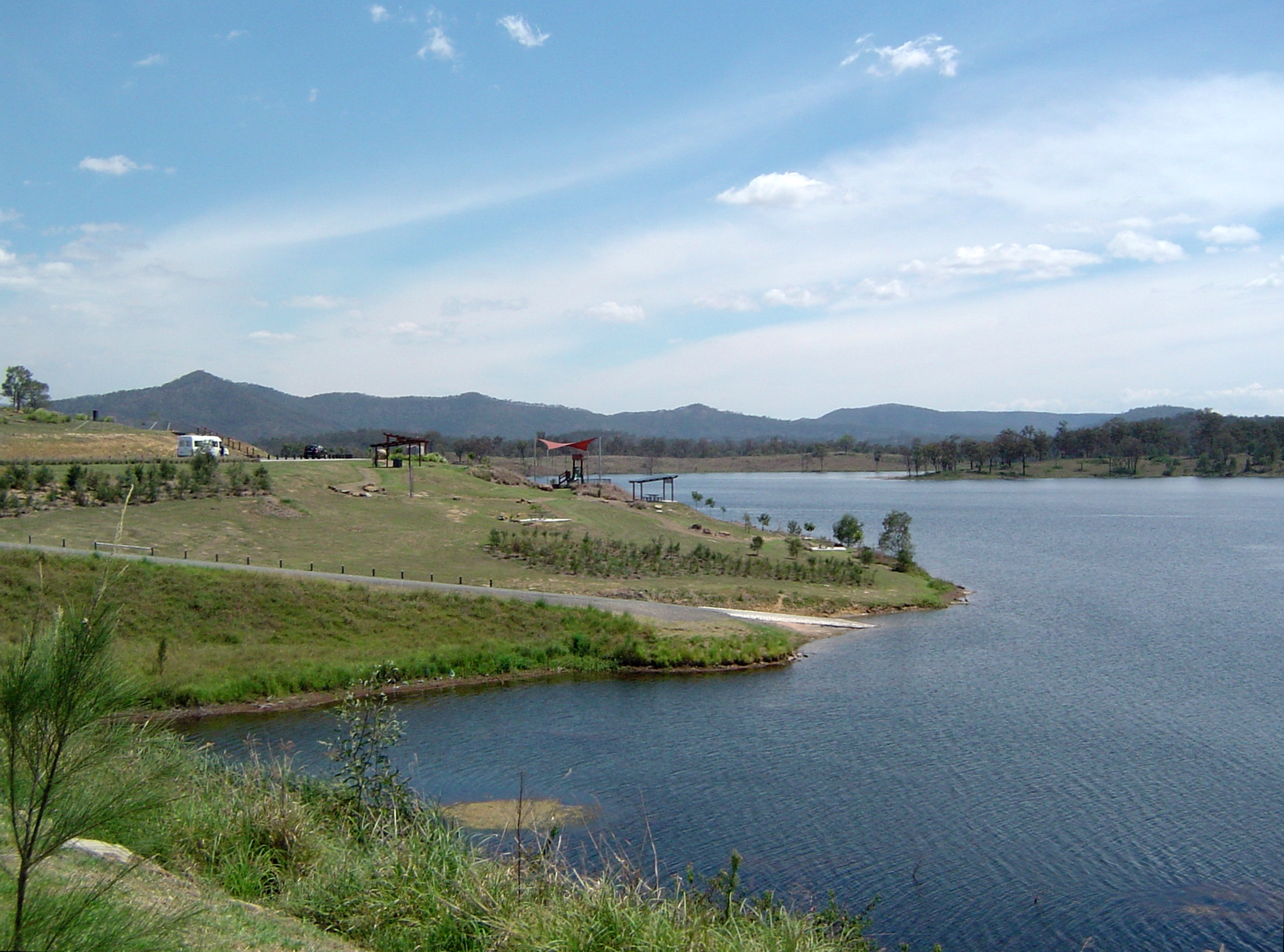
Picnic area and boat ramp

The construction was tendered under an alliance contract where the project's risks and rewards are shared by all the contracted parties, including designers, constructors, and the owner. The Queensland Dam Consortium won the tender for the dam's construction and the alliance partners included Macmahon Constructions as the lead contractor, Hydro Tasmania, Snowy Mountains Engineering Corporation, Paul Rizzo and Associates (USA), and ASI Contractors (USA). Queensland Water Infrastructure was the special purpose vehicle created by the Queensland Government and a party to the alliance contract. The contract for dam construction was for a little over A$100 million. However it was widely reported that the building costs for the dam would total A$333 million. The latter figure included the cost of the Bromelton Offpeak Storage Project, Cedar Grove Weir and the reconstruction of a length of the Boonah to Beaudesert Road.

Work on access roads began in early 2009 and construction of the dam wall began in early 2010. The diversion channel was plugged on 17 December 2010, allowing the dam to begin to fill. The dam site was opened to the public on 3 June 2011. The 12 kilometres (7.5 mi) of new road between Boonah and Beaudesert were constructed under a separate contract by Fulton Hogan.

The dam cost A$380 million to construct, including purchasing farmland flooded by the dam reservoir.

=== Treatment ===
By late 2012 the dam still had not been connected to the SEQ Water Grid because it contained water so mineralised it is cheaper to produce desalinated water than to treat it. The Wyaralong water treatment plant was expected to cost A$235 million to construct. Funding for the plant was planned for the 2014/15 financial year. In 2017 SEQ Water external relations manager Mike Foster stated the Wyaralong Water Treatment Plant wouldn't be necessary until "2030 or beyond".

== January 2011 floods ==
As a result of rainfall during the 2010–2011 Queensland floods the dam filled to 100% capacity, just 25 days after the wall was plugged to hold water, but before its completion. By 10 January, during the flood period, the dam held 83,133 megalitres (67,397 acre⋅ft), 80.7 per cent of its 103,000-megalitre (84,000 acre⋅ft) capacity. Parts of the dam were still under construction, but its wall was plugged to hold water on 17 December 2010. On 11 January the dam filled and began to overtop at 9:27am. Following the overtopping, in the first 24 hours over 17,300 megalitres (14,000 acre⋅ft) of water flowed over the primary spillway and entered the Logan River at Cedar Grove.

== See also ==
- List of dams in Queensland
