= Milbong, Queensland =

Milbong
- Suburb
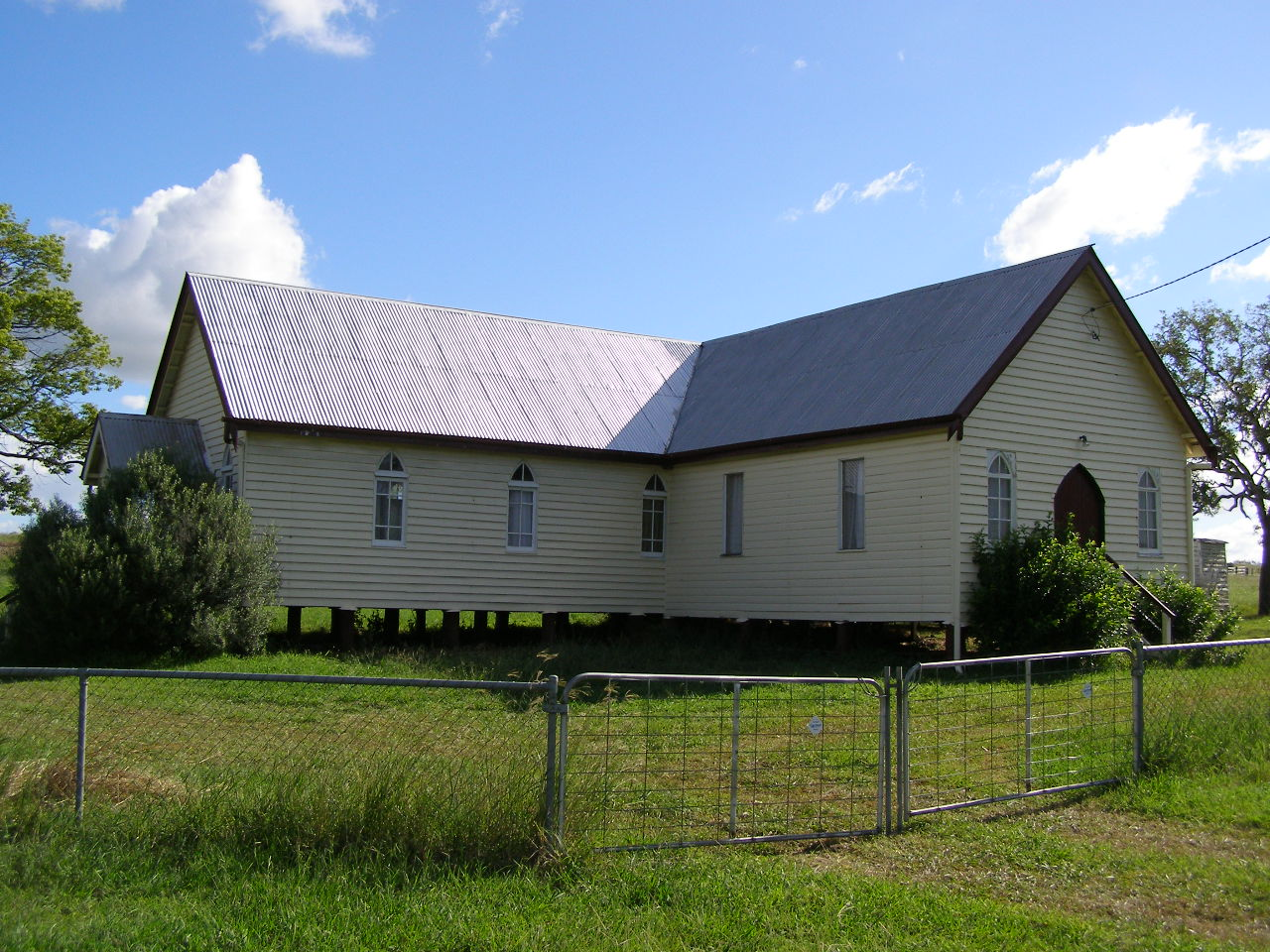
- Former Milbong Congregational Church, 2006

- Interactive map of Milbong
- Coordinates: 27.8833°S 152.7322°E
- Country: Australia
- State: Queensland
- LGA: Scenic Rim Region
- Location: 16.1 km (10.0 mi) NNE of Boonah; 32.4 km (20.1 mi) S of Ipswich; 40.7 km (25.3 mi) WNW of Beaudesert; 71.5 km (44.4 mi) SW of Brisbane CBD

Government
  - State electorate: Scenic Rim
  - Federal division: Wright

Area
  - Total: 24.6 km^{2} (9.5 sq mi)

Population
  - Total: 190 (2021 census)
  - Density: 7.72/km^{2} (20.0/sq mi)
- Time zone: UTC+10:00 (AEST)
- Postcode: 4310
Suburbs around Milbong
| Milora | Limestone Ridges | Washpool |
| Anthony | Milbong | Woolooman |
| Roadvale | Roadvale | Wyaralong |

Milbong is a rural locality in the Scenic Rim Region, Queensland, Australia. In the 2021 census, Milbong had a population of 190 people.

== Geography ==
Purga Creek flows through from the south before forming the north-eastern boundary.

One Eye Waterhole is in the centre of the locality (27.8816°S 152.7306°E).

The Ipswich – Boonah Road (State Route 93) runs through from north to south.

== History ==
The name Milbong is a combination of two Aboriginal words in Ugarapul dialect, in which mil means eye and bong means dead. An Aboriginal with only one eye is supposed to have camped by a waterhole in the vicinity.

In the late 1870s, the choice of name for the district was contentious with three names in popular use: One Eye Waterhole (from the natural feature), Blantyre (the name of a local farm), Waterview (the name of the Congregational Church) and Milbong. The establishment of a post office and school created a need to resolve the issue of naming, resulting in Milbong being eventually chosen.

Blantyre One Eye Waterhole State School was established circa 25 July 1874. By 1877, it had been renamed Milbong State School. It closed in 1965. It was at 2616 Ipswich Boonah Road (corner Milbong Road, 27.8843°S 152.7275°E).

Blantyre Congregational Church at "One Eye" was completed about 1877, later being called the Waterview Congregational Church, before becoming known as Milbong Congregational Church. It was at 5 Milbong Road (27.8849°S 152.7274°E). The church building is still extant, but is now being used as a house.

Milbong Lutheran Church (also known as St Luke's Lutheran Church) opened on 23 September 1885. A new church (built on the site of the original church) was opened on 10 April 1906, while the old church was removed to be use as a barn but was later burned down. The church closed in 1974 and the church building removed, but the cemetery remains. The church site and cemetery was on the Ipswich Boonah Road, but is now within the suburb of Roadvale.

== Demographics ==
In the 2016 census, Milbong had a population of 161 people. The locality contains 66 households, in which 50.6% of the population are males and 49.4% of the population are females with a median age of 45, 7 years above the national average. The average weekly household income is $1,140, $298 below the national average. 0.0% of Milbong's population is either of Aborigional or Torres Strait Islander descent. 68.5% of the population aged 15 or over is either registered or de facto married, while 31.5% of the population is not married. 29.1% of the population is currently attending some form of a compulsory education. The most common nominated ancestries were Australian (37.1%), English (27.2%) and German (9.4%), while the most common country of birth was Australia (86.9%), and the most commonly spoken language at home was English (93.2%). The most common nominated religions were Catholic (27.5%), the Uniting Church (19.7%) and No religion (19.7%). The most common occupation was a cleric/administration worker (24.6%) and the majority/plurality of residents worked 40 or more hours per week (43.1%).

In the 2021 census, Milbong had a population of 190 people.

== Education ==
There are no schools in Milbong. The nearest government primary schools are Roadvale State School in neighbouring Roadvale to the south and Peak Crossing State School in Peak Crossing to the north. The nearest government secondary school is Boonah State High School in Boonah to the south.

== Facilities ==
Milbong General Cemetery (27.8792°S 152.7271°E) does not face any street but can be accessed via a path from the Ipswich Boonah Road (27.8819°S 152.7292°E) opposite the rest area.
