= Teviot Brook =

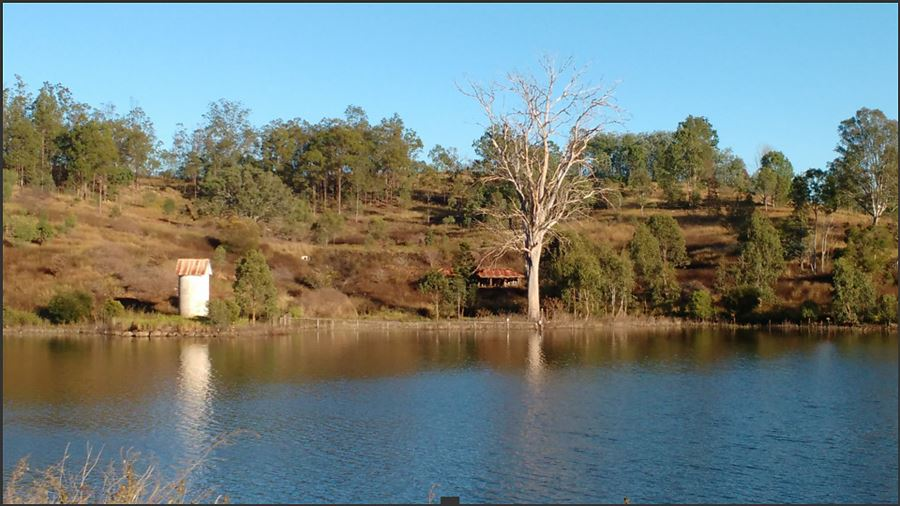
- Teviot Brook at Wyaralong, 2022

- Location of the Teviot Brook mouth in Queensland
- Etymology: Allan Cunningham
- Native name: Ickkaybin

Location
- Country: Australia
- State: Queensland
- Region: South East Queensland
- Local government areas: Scenic Rim Region

Physical characteristics
- Source: Scenic Rim
  - location: below Mount Roberts
  - coordinates: 28°10′06″S 152°33′22″E
- Mouth: Logan River
  - location: east of Cedar Grove
  - coordinates: 27°50′36″S 152°56′46″E
  - elevation: 31 m (102 ft)

Basin features
- National park: Main Range National Park

Teviot Brook is a waterway in South East Queensland, Australia. It rises in the Main Range at Carneys Creek and joins the Logan River at Cedar Grove. It is part of the Clarence Moreton Basin, a sedimentary basin on the easternmost part of the Australian continent.

The catchment experiences strong seasonality with heavy rainfall in summer and a dry winter. Teviot Brook passes through the town of Boonah and Mount Alford. Close to its mouth, Teviot Brook is crossed by the Sydney–Brisbane rail corridor.

== History ==
It was named on 6 August 1828 by Allan Cunningham, a botanist and explorer, after the River Teviot, Roxburghshire, Scotland. A plaque commemorating the naming is found at Coulson School in Coulson.

In 2011, the Wyaralong Dam was opened. It dams the Teviot Brook between Allenview and Wyaralong at the southern end of the Flinders Peak Group.

== Management ==
The state government is working with landholders in the catchment to reduce sediment and nutrient runoff. Other restoration programs along the river aim to control weeds, restore native vegetation and stabilise eroding banks.
