= Roadvale, Queensland =

Roadvale
- Town
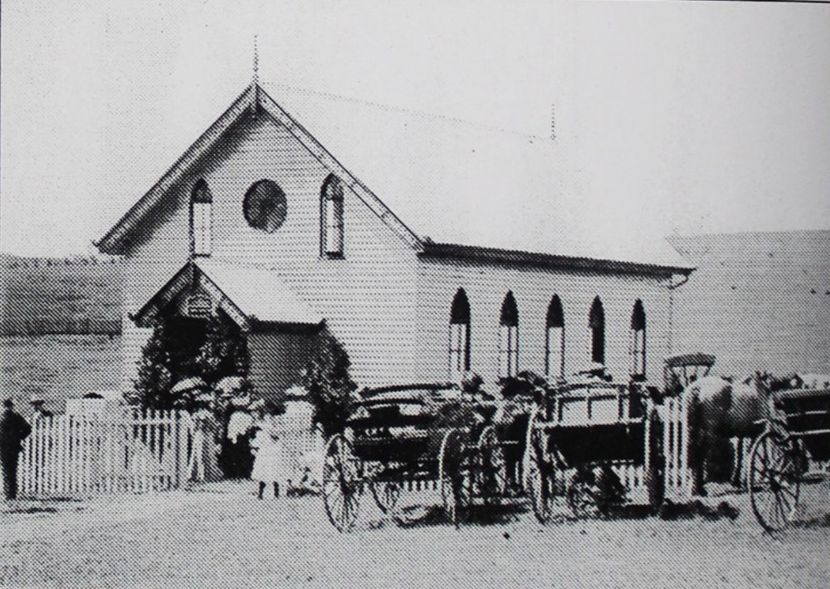
- Milbong (St Luke's) Lutheran Church, circa 1907

- Interactive map of Roadvale
- Coordinates: 27.9205°S 152.7027°E
- Country: Australia
- State: Queensland
- LGA: Scenic Rim Region
- Location: 11.2 km (7.0 mi) N of Boonah; 38.7 km (24.0 mi) WNW of Beaudesert; 78.1 km (48.5 mi) SW of Brisbane

Government
  - State electorate: Scenic Rim
  - Federal division: Blair

Area
  - Total: 17.5 km^{2} (6.8 sq mi)

Population
  - Total: 303 (2021 census)
  - Density: 17.31/km^{2} (44.84/sq mi)
- Time zone: UTC+10:00 (AEST)
- Postcode: 4310
Localities around Roadvale
Blantyre	Anthony	Milbong
Obum Obum	Roadvale	Wyaralong
Kulgun	Teviotville	Coulson

Roadvale is a rural locality in the Scenic Rim Region, Queensland, Australia. In the 2021 census, the locality of Roadvale had a population of 303 people.

== Geography ==
Roadvale is 14 kilometres (8.7 mi) north of the town Boonah and 79 kilometres (49 mi) south-west of the state capital Brisbane.

The main street is Gray Street, which is also the Roadvale-Kalbar Road.

Roadvale is a growing centre for many of the small crop products sold in South East Queensland and other areas.

Ipswich – Boonah Road (State Route 93) runs through from north to south.

== History ==
The locality takes its name from its former railway station which was named by the Queensland Railways Department in 1887, because of its location at a road junction.

The Fassifern railway line (Queensland's first branch railway line) opened from Ipswich to Harrisville on 10 July 1882. On 12 September 1887 the line was extended to Dugundan with the Roadvale district being served by Roadvale railway station on the corner of Wilsons Plains Road and Redhill Road (27.9164°S 152.6839°E). The line closed in June 1964.

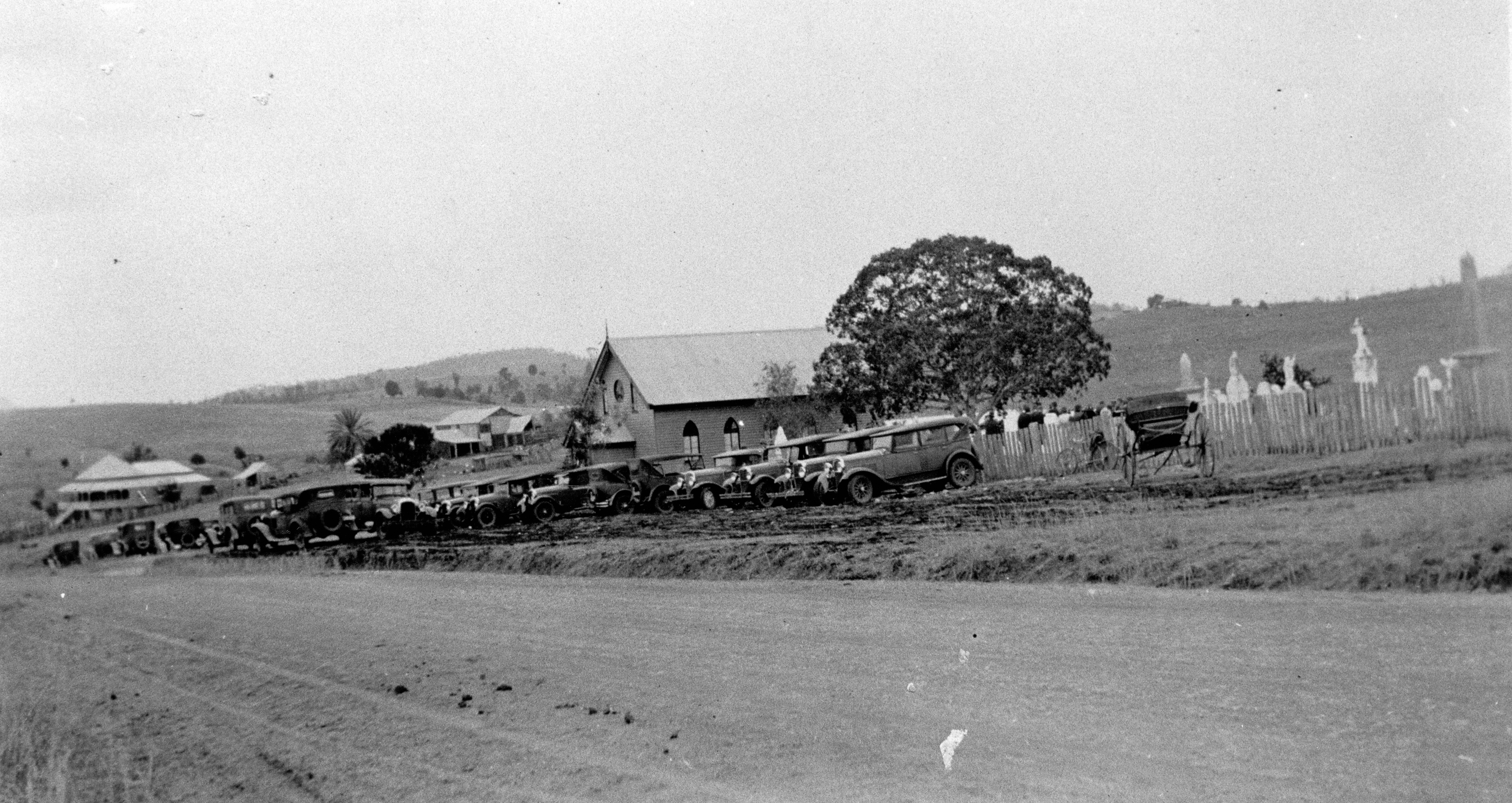
Milbong (St Luke's) Lutheran Church and cemetery, circa 1930

Milbong Lutheran Church (also known as St Luke's Lutheran Church) opened on 23 September 1885. A new church (built on the site of the original church) was opened on 10 April 1906, while the old church was removed to be use as a barn but was later burned down. The church closed in 1974 and the church building was removed, but the cemetery remains. The church site and cemetery is on the Ispwich Boonah Road (27.9322°S 152.7147°E).

St Andrew's Anglican Church was dedicated on 11 May 1912 by Venerable Henry Le Fanu, the Archdeacon of Toowoomba. In 1926, the church closed and the building was relocated to Camp Hill in Brisbane to become the Anglican Church of the Annunciation.

In 1915, most of the town was destroyed by fire. Despite rebuilding many businesses, the town has never recovered from the devastating fire.

== Demographics ==
In the 2006 census, the locality of Roadvale and the surrounding area had a population of 559 people.

In the 2016 census, the locality of Roadvale had a population of 286 people.

In the 2021 census, the locality of Roadvale had a population of 303 people.

== Heritage listings ==
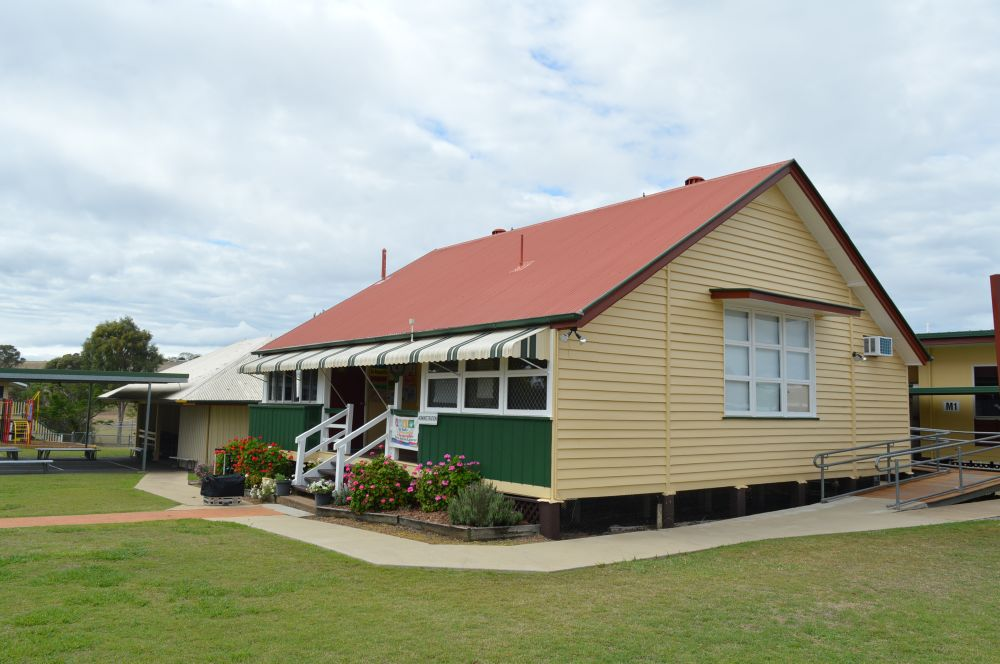
Roadvale State School, heritage-listed Block A from the north-west, 2018

The heritage-listed sites in Roadvale include:

- Roadvale State School, 111 Roadvale Road (27.9203°S 152.7052°E)

== Education ==
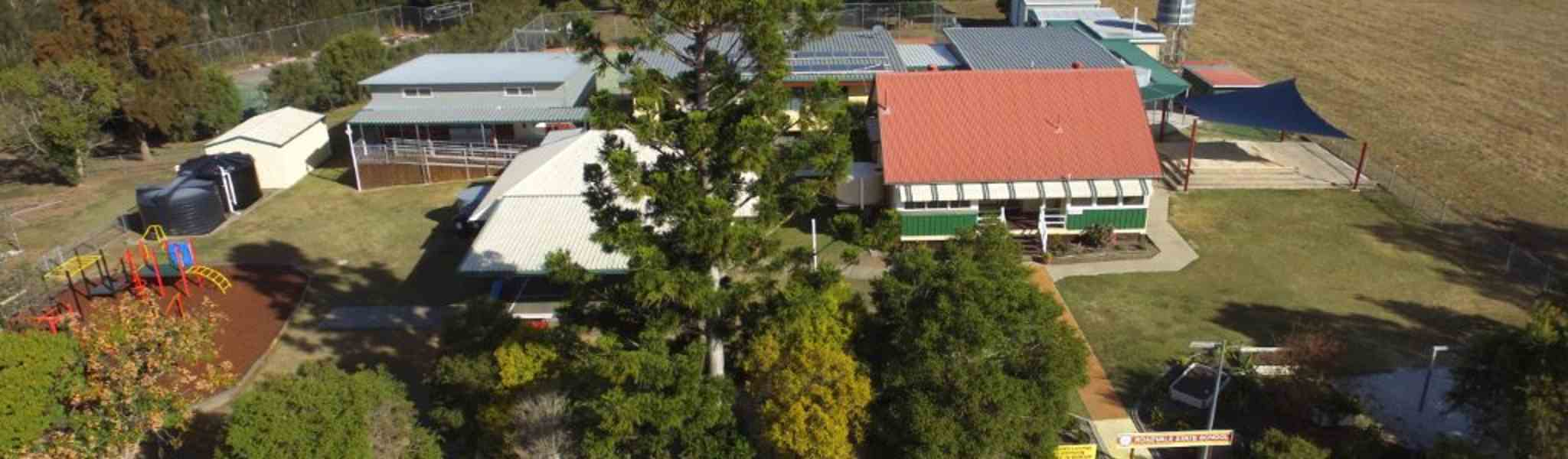
Aerial view, Roadvale State School, circa 2023

Roadvale State School is a government primary (Prep-6) school for boys and girls at 111 Roadvale Road (27.9201°S 152.7050°E). In 2018, the school had an enrolment of 39 students with 5 teachers (3 full-time equivalent) and 5 non-teaching staff (3 full-time equivalent).

There are no secondary schools in Roadvale. The nearest government secondary school is Boonah State High School in Boonah to the south.

== Facilities ==
It has a pub and a small general store in the main street.
