= Harrisville, Queensland =

Harrisville
- Town
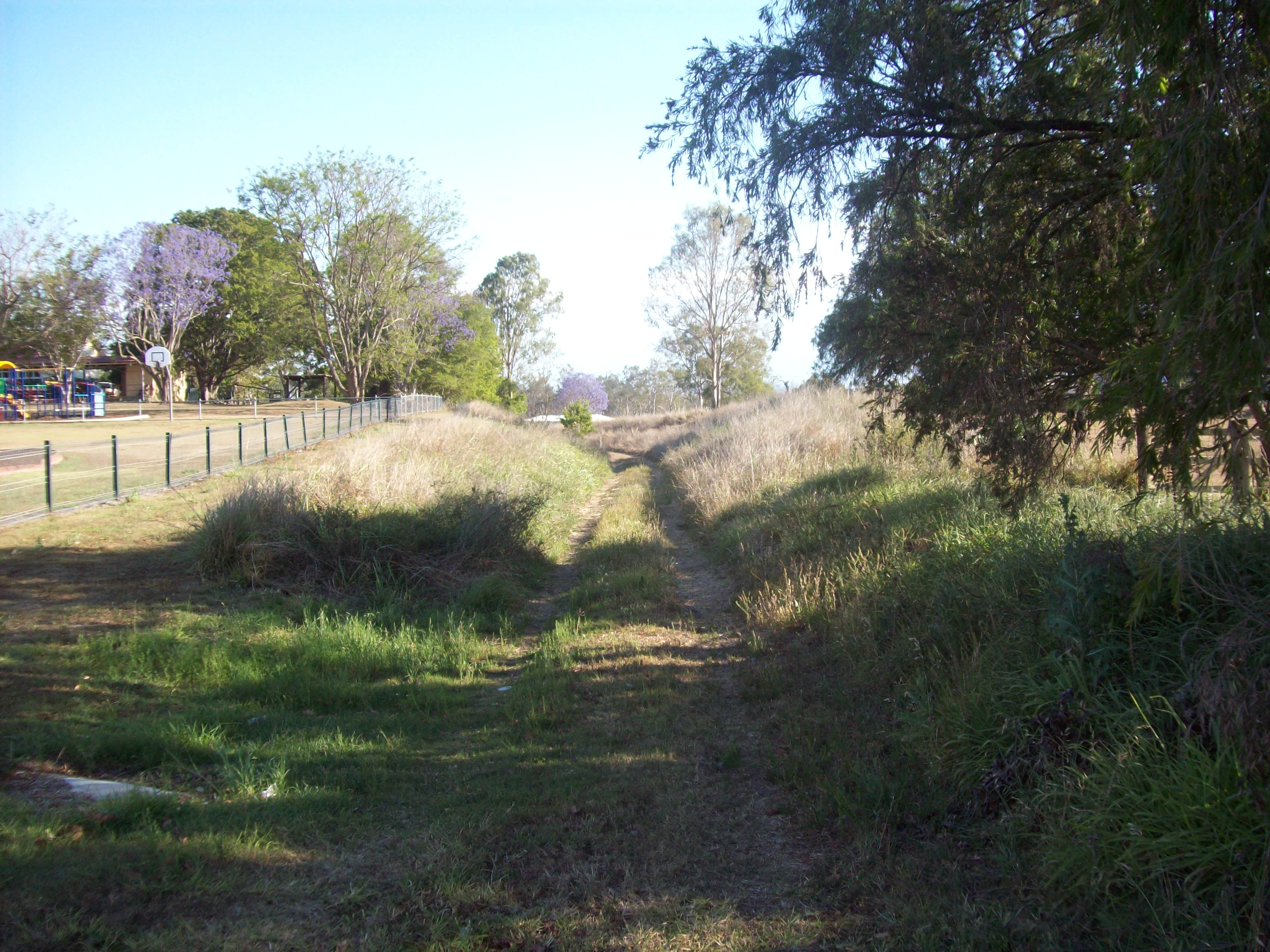
- Former Dugandan railway line, 2009

- Interactive map of Harrisville
- Coordinates: 27.81°S 152.6672°E
- Country: Australia
- State: Queensland
- LGA: Scenic Rim Region
- Location: 26.3 km (16.3 mi) N of Boonah; 28.5 km (17.7 mi) SSW of Ipswich; 53.8 km (33.4 mi) NW of Beaudesert; 67.6 km (42.0 mi) SW of Brisbane

Government
  - State electorate: Scenic Rim
  - Federal division: Wright

Area
  - Total: 31.8 km^{2} (12.3 sq mi)

Population
  - Total: 667 (2021 census)
  - Density: 20.97/km^{2} (54.32/sq mi)
- Time zone: UTC+10:00 (AEST)
- Postcode: 4307
Localities around Harrisville
Coleyville	Mutdapilly	Peak Crossing
Warrill View	Harrisville	Limestone Ridges
Warrill View	Wilsons Plains	Milora

Harrisville is a rural town and locality in the Scenic Rim Region, Queensland, Australia. In the 2021 census, the locality of Harrisville had a population of 667 people. Harrisville is home to The Fassifern Bombers RLFC and The Fassifern Bombers JRLFC.

== Geography ==
Warrill Creek, a tributary of the Bremer River, passes through the western parts of the town.

== History ==
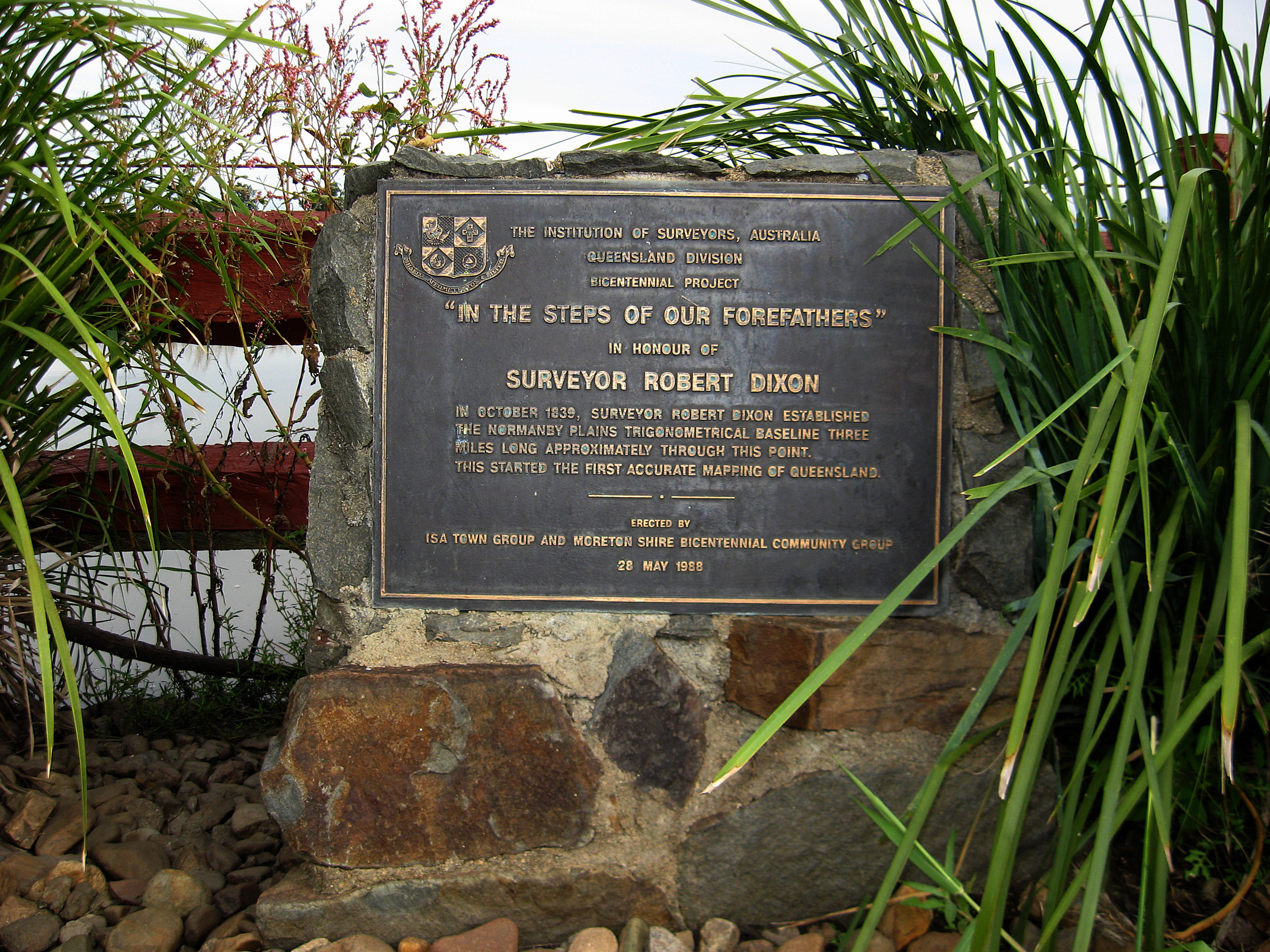
Trigonometrical Baseline Cairn, 2015

In 1839, a survey baseline of 3 miles (4.8 km) was marked out on the floodplain, then known as Normanby Plains, which now forms part of Harrisville, together with Wilsons Plains and Radford to the south. It was supervised by the surveyor Robert Dixon as the basis of a trigonometrical survey starting with Flinders Peak to the east and Mount Walker (then Mount Forbes) to the west, which began the accurate interior mapping of Queensland. A monument to this work "In the Steps of Our Forefathers" is situated just west of the Harrisville township on the Warrill View Peak Crossing Road, along where the baseline passed (27.8142°S 152.6510°E).

The area formed part of the old Mount Flinders sheep station established by William Wilson (and his brother Robert) around 1844, soon after the Moreton Bay penal colony closed. Some of the land from this station became available to selectors in December 1860 with provision of the Ipswich Agricultural Reserve. In 1863 Robert Dunn selected a portion from this Reserve, from which the Harris brothers purchased their land in 1870.

The town is believed to be named after Harris brothers: John Harris (1819–1895) and George Harris (1831–1891) . They established a store and cotton ginnery in the area. Cotton was a valuable crop at that time as the American Civil War had created a worldwide shortage.

Ipswich Reserve State School opened in 1867. In 1887, it was renamed Harrisville State School. In 1891, it was renamed Hillgrove State School, enabling a new school to open on 19 January 1891 under the name Harrisville State School. The new school reduced attendance at the Hillgrove State School and it was demoted to become Hillgrove Provisional School, but returned to state school status in 1894. Hillgrove State School closed in 1932, but, as at 2019, the "new" Harrisville State School continues to operate.

On Sunday 27 August 1871, a Wesleyan Methodist church was opened near Harrisville.

Harrisville Post Office opened on 1 August 1873 (a receiving office had been open from 1871).

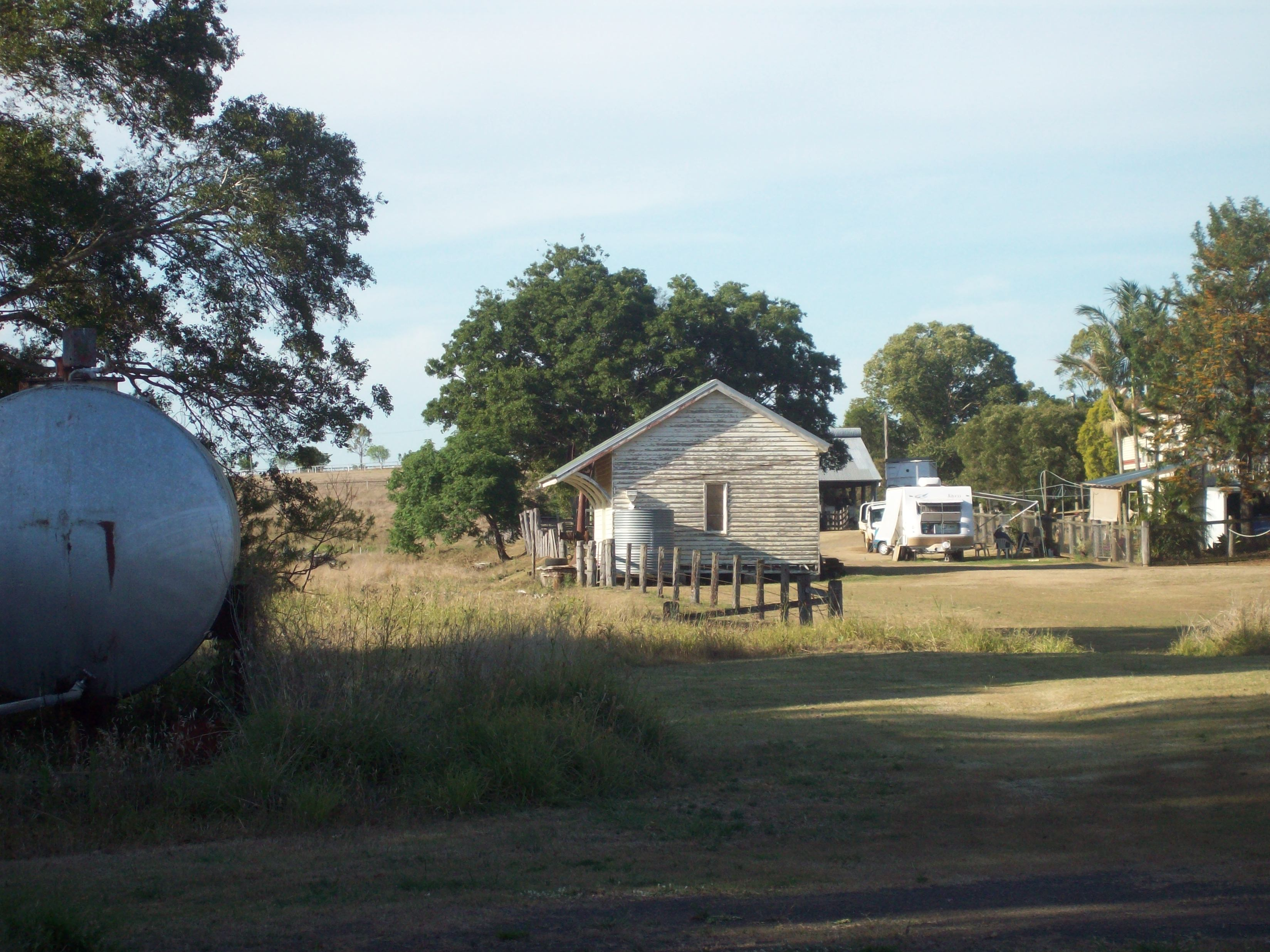
The former Harrisville railway station, 2009

The Fassifern railway line (Queensland's first branch railway line) opened from Ipswich to Harrisville on 10 July 1882 with the town being served by Harrisville railway station in Queen Street (27.8110°S 152.6666°E), while Churchbank railway station was located in Webers Road (27.7891°S 152.6916°E) in the very north of the present day locality of Harrisville on the boundary with Mutdapilly. On 12 September 1887 the line was extended to Dugundan. The line closed in 1964.

St John's Anglican Church was dedicated on Sunday 14 April 1878 by Bishop of Brisbane Matthew Hale. On 18 January 1985 the church was destroyed in a storm. The foundation stone for the new St John the Evangelist's Anglican Church was laid on 16 February 1986 by Archbishop John Grindrod. It was consecrated on 20 April 1986 by Assistant Bishop Adrian Owen Charles.

Harrisville Presbyterian Church was built in 1891.

In November 1909, 17 farms of 131 to 336 acres in the Bald Ridges estate Normanby (near Harrisville) were advertised to be auctioned by Isles Love. A map advertising the auction states the Estate was 6 miles from the railway station being within three hours form Brisbane.

A private hospital operated from 1911 until 1973.

In 1926 the Harrisville Methodist Church was established by relocating a Methodist church building from near Peak Crossing, which was originally built in 1871 on land owned by William Bole and known as Woodchurch Wesleyan Church. In the 1970s as part of the amalgamation of the Methodist, Presbyterian and Congregation churches into the Uniting Church in Australia, the Harrisville Methodist Church building was relocated to the site of the Harrisville Presbyterian Church and the two buildings joined in an L-shape to become the Harrisville Uniting Church.

The centenary of Harrisville was celebrated in 1963 with a street parade and centenary ball organised by the Harrisville Centenary Celebrations Committee. In 2013 Harrisville commemorated 150 years with a street procession and unveiling of a plaque by Penelope Wensley, the Governor of Queensland.

== Demographics ==
In the 2016 census, the locality of Harrisville had a population of 613 people. The locality contains 241 households, in which 48.8% of the population are males and 51.2% of the population are females with a median age of 39, 1 year above the national average. The average weekly household income is $1,298, $140 below the national average. 4.5% of Harrisville's population is either of Aborigional or Torres Strait Islander descent. 64.8% of the population aged 15 or over is either registered or de facto married, while 35.2% of the population is not married. 30.3% of the population is currently attending some form of a compulsory education. The most common nominated ancestries were Australian (34.3%), English (30.5%) and German (10.3%), while the most common country of birth was Australia (85.0%), and the most commonly spoken language at home was English (94.1%). The most common nominated religions were No religion (24.2%), Anglican (21.6%) and Catholic (19.0%). The most common occupation was a technician/trades worker (16.6%) and the majority/plurality of residents worked 40 or more hours per week (44.1%).

In the 2021 census, the locality of Harrisville had a population of 667 people.

== Heritage listings ==
Harrisville has the following heritage sites:

- Courthouse and Police Lock-up, 13 Church Street
- School of Arts, 5 Hall Street
- Masonic Hall, 16 Hall Street
- Commercial Hotel, 34 Queen Street
- Former Royal Bank, 35 Queen Street
- Memorial Park, 43–47 Queen Street
- Sacred Heart Catholic Church, 54–58 Queen Street
- Royal Hotel, 1–5 Wholly Drive

== Education ==
Harrisville State School is a government primary (Prep–6) school for boys and girls at 17 Hall Street (27.8126°S 152.6673°E). In 2017, the school had an enrolment of 91 students with 10 teachers (6 full-time equivalent) and 15 non-teaching staff (6 full-time equivalent).

There are no secondary schools in Harrisville. The nearest government secondary schools are Boonah State High School in Boonah to the south-east, Rosewood State High School in Rosewood to the north-west, and Bremer State High School in Ipswich CBD to the north.

== Facilities ==
Harrisville Cemetery is at the intersection of Harrisville-Peak Crossing Road and Webers Road (27.8034°S 152.6909°E) and is operated by local trustees.

== Amenities ==
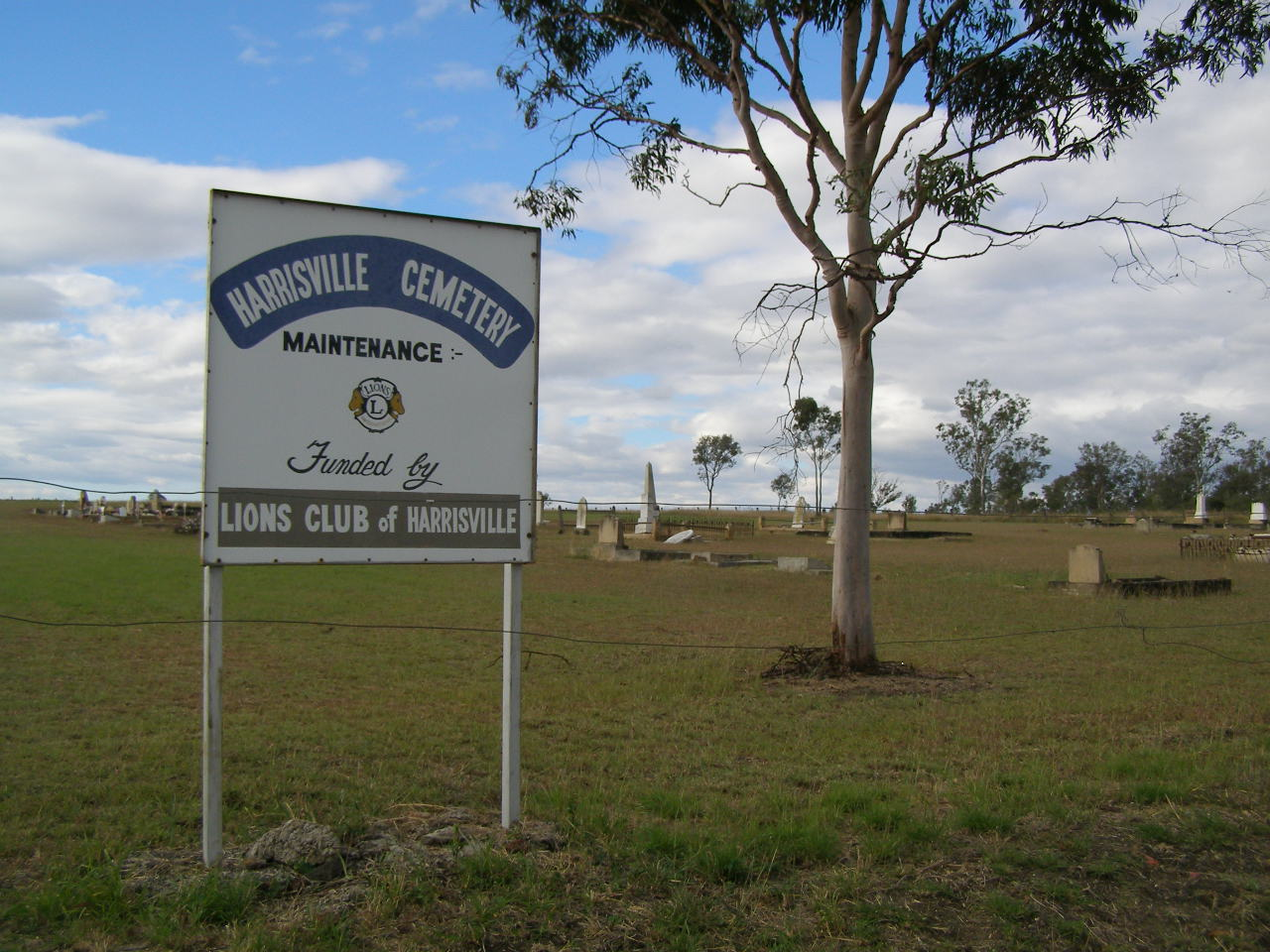
Harrisville cemetery, 2008

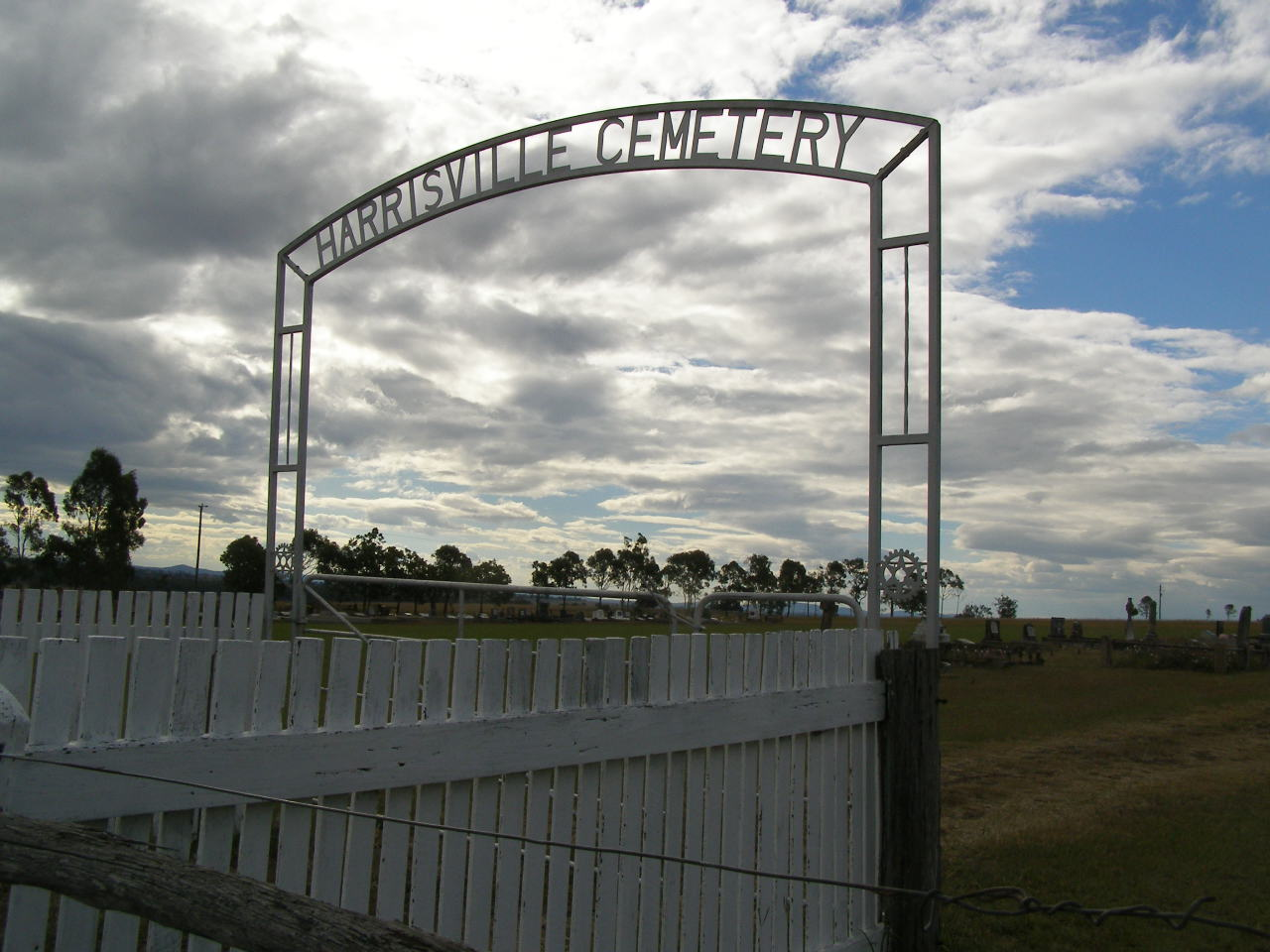
Harrisville cemetery entrance gates, 2008

The Scenic Rim Regional Council operates a mobile library service which visits the Memorial Park.

The Harrisville branch of the Queensland Country Women's Association meets at the QCWA Rest Rooms at 43 Queen Street.

St John's Anglican Church is at 1 Church Street (27.8086°S 152.6632°E). Two Sunday services are held each month.

Harrisville Uniting Church is at 4 Hall Street (27.8119°S 152.6680°E). It is part of the South Moreton Presbytery of the Uniting Church in Australia.

Hayes Oval is located on Pollock Street and is home to The Fassifern Bombers.

== Attractions ==
The Harrisville Historical Society maintains a museum in Queen Street which includes a rain-gun used during the 1902 drought.
