= Roadvale State School =

Heritage listed school in Queensland

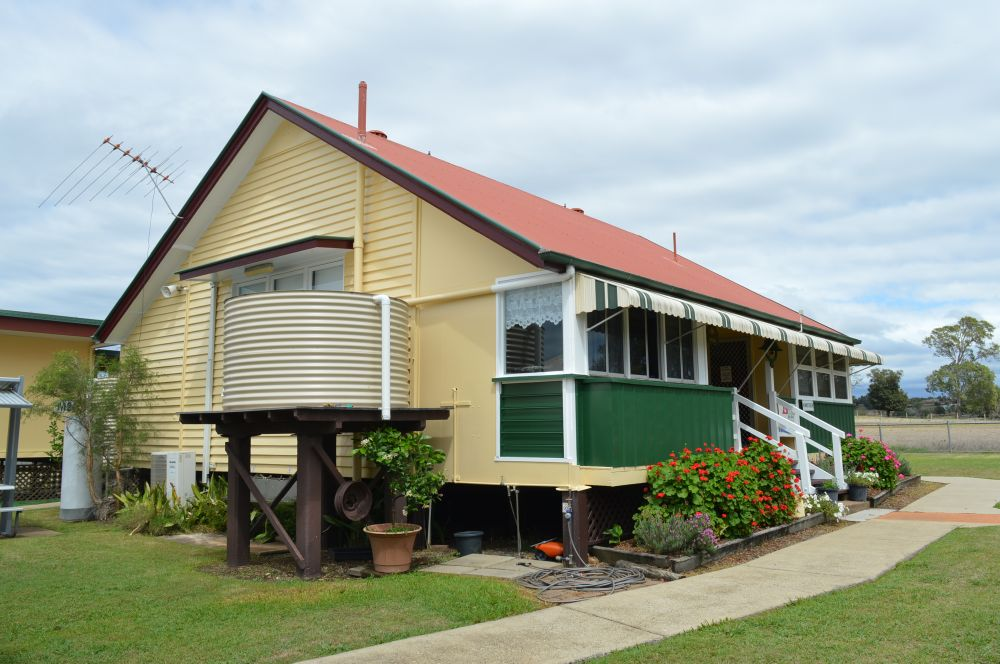
- Roadvale State School, 2018

- Location within Queensland
- 27.9203°S 152.7052°E
- Location: 111 Roadvale Road, Roadvale, Scenic Rim Region, Queensland, Australia

History
- Design period: 1870s–1890s (Late 19th century)
- Built: 1889–1899

Site notes
- Architect(s): John Ferguson and Robert Ferguson of the Department of Public Works (Queensland)

Queensland Heritage Register
- Official name: Roadvale State School
- Type: state heritage
- Designated: 31 May 2019
- Reference no.: 650095
- Type: Education, Research, Scientific Facility: Children's playground/play area; Education, Research, Scientific Facility: School – state (primary); Education, research, scientific facility: School-state
- Theme: Educating Queenslanders: Providing primary schooling

Roadvale State School is a heritage-listed state school at 111 Roadvale Road, Roadvale, Scenic Rim Region, Queensland, Australia. It was designed by John Ferguson and Robert Ferguson of the Department of Public Works (Queensland) and was built from 1889 to 1899. It was added to the Queensland Heritage Register on 31 May 2019.

== History ==
Roadvale State School is located 8.5 kilometres (5.3 mi) north of Boonah and 65 kilometres (40 mi) south-west of Brisbane. It opened in 1889, soon after closer settlement commenced in the district. The school was established 2 kilometres (1.2 mi) east of the small township of Roadvale in a rural setting. It retains an 1889 Ferguson Teaching Building and an 1899 playshed. Its grounds are surrounded by open farmland. The school has been in continuous operation since its establishment and has been the focus for the local community as a place of important social and cultural activity.

Roadvale forms part of the traditional land of the Yuggera Ugarapul people. When European settlement began in the area in the 1840s, large pastoral runs were established and the district became known as the Fassifern Valley. In the 1870s several of these were divided and made available for closer settlement. In the Roadvale area, German settlers cleared the land and began farming. As rural settlement increased throughout the Fassifern Valley, the Dugandan railway line was constructed in 1886–87 to provide an efficient means for farmers to transport produce to markets in Brisbane and Ipswich. The line branched from Ipswich to Dugandan via Boonah, and a station was built at Roadvale. This proved a catalyst for further settlement in the Roadvale area, attracting more immigrants, mainly from Germany, who established farms.

The small township of Roadvale emerged to provide goods and services to the farmers. By the early 1900s Roadvale had become a bustling centre in the Fassifern Valley and boasted three hotels, several stores, banks, a post office, bakery, blacksmith's shop and a butcher.

In the 1880s, as the population in Roadvale increased, so too did the need for a school. Although there were several earlier schools established in the district, including Blantrye, Milbong and Milora, all were several miles from Roadvale and the children found it difficult to travel that far every day. As a result, attendance at these schools by children from Roadvale was inconsistent. The settlers at Roadvale recognised the value of education for their children and in 1888, following the formation of a school building committee, an application was submitted to the Department of Public Instruction (the department) for a separate school for Roadvale. The department was assured that there would be at least 46 enrolments, with an age range from five to fourteen years.

The provision of state-administered education was important to the colonial governments of Australia. National schools, established in 1848 in New South Wales, were continued in Queensland following the colony's creation in 1859. Following the introduction of the Education Act 1860, which established the Board of General Education and began standardising curriculum, training and facilities, Queensland's national and public schools grew from four in 1860 to 230 by 1875. The State Education Act 1875 provided for free, compulsory and secular primary education and established the department. This further standardised the provision of education, and despite difficulties, achieved the remarkable feat of bringing basic literacy to most Queensland children by 1900.

The establishment of schools was considered an essential step in the development of early communities and integral to their success. Locals often donated land and labour for a school's construction and the school community contributed to maintenance and development. Schools became a community focus, a symbol of progress, and a source of pride, with enduring connections formed with past pupils, parents, and teachers. When the application was made for a school at Roadvale, the community had raised £70 and by November 1888, £130 had been raised. A 2-acre (0.81 ha) site on Portion 141 was donated by Roadvale settler, Rudolph Beitzel, with the department's assurance that he would be reimbursed £24 for the land. This occurred several years later.

Initially, the department had reservations about a school at Roadvale, due to the number of schools in the district. However, following further requests from the Roadvale community, and consideration of the potential growth of the area, the department approved the construction of the school. On 7 February 1889 tenders were called for "the erection of new state school buildings at Roadvale". The successful contractor was Charles Newman and would cost £610. The announcement was made in the Brisbane Courier: "the Government having decided to establish a state school at Roadvale, near Blantyre, have accepted the tender of Charles Newman".

To help ensure consistency and economy, the Queensland Government developed standard plans for its school buildings. From the 1860s until the 1960s, Queensland school buildings were predominantly timber-framed, an easy and cost-effective approach that also enabled the government to provide facilities in remote areas. Standard designs were continually refined in response to changing needs and educational philosophy and Queensland school buildings were particularly innovative in climate control, lighting, and ventilation. Standardisation produced distinctly similar schools across Queensland with complexes of typical components.

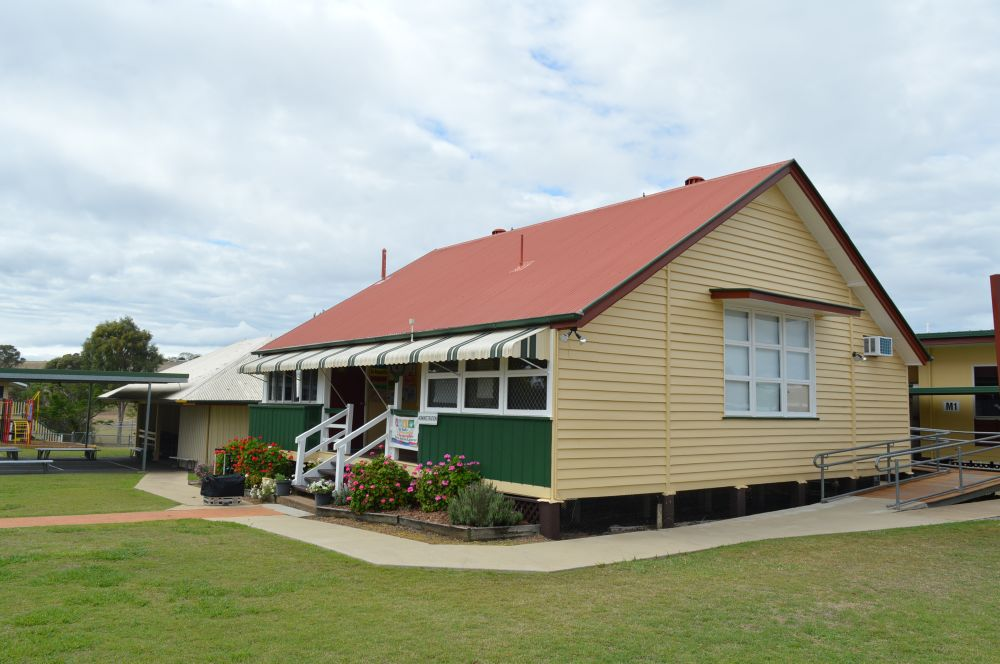
View from the north-west, 2018

The new building at Roadvale State School was built to a standard design (B/T4) that had been introduced in 1880 and constructed across the colony until 1893. Employed by the Department of Public Instruction, Robert Ferguson was responsible for school building design between 1879 and 1885 and he was the first to give serious consideration to the ventilation of interiors. Into the low-set, timber-framed buildings Ferguson introduced a coved ceiling and vented the roof space, improving internal temperatures. The number of windows and their size was increased; however, they were few in number and sill heights were typically over 4 ft 6 in (1.37 m) above floor level, well above eye level of students. Modestly-decorative timber roof trusses were exposed within the space. Built to this standard design, the new school building at Roadvale State School was a lowset, timber-framed structure with gable roof, verandahs front and back, and modest "carpenter gothic" timber detailing. It had a single classroom space, naturally lit and ventilated by windows on the east and west gable-end walls.

In 1885 Robert Ferguson was replaced by his brother John Ferguson who continued to implement his brother's designs until John's death in 1893, when responsibility for school buildings passed back to the Department of Public Works. The Ferguson period (1879–1893) is distinct and marked by extensive redesign of school buildings including associated structures and furniture. The Ferguson brothers' designs were reflective of education requirements of the time, responsive to criticism of previous designs, revolutionary in terms of internal environmental quality, technically innovative, popular and successful and provided a long-lasting legacy of good educational design.

Roadvale State School was opened on the 14 November 1889 with William Seeley appointed the school's first head teacher, and an enrolment of 31 students. Seeley taught at the school until 1899. By 1899 the enrolments had increased to 51 students. A teacher's residence was also constructed in 1889. Unfortunately, this was destroyed by fire in 1917.

The school became the centre for the Roadvale district's social life with dances, fund-raising events and community group meetings held in the school building. In 1904, following the construction of the Roadvale School of Arts on the main street of town, many of these activities were then carried out in the new hall.

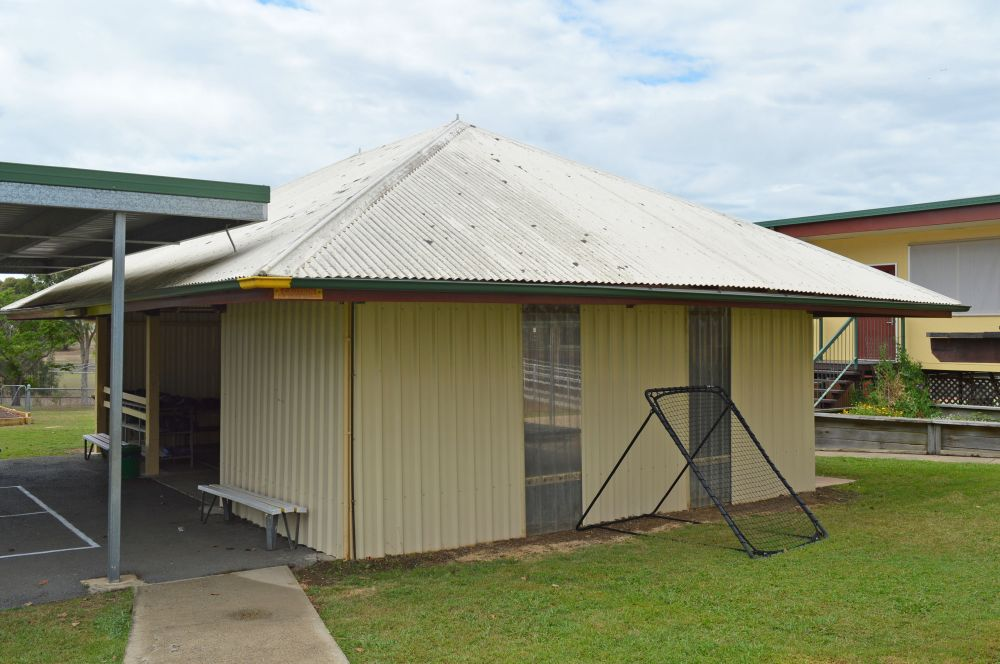
Playshed from the north-west, 2018

In 1899 the playshed was built. The Queensland education system recognised the importance of play in the school curriculum and, as school sites were typically cleared of all vegetation, the provision of all-weather outdoor space was needed. Playsheds were designed as free-standing shelters, with fixed timber seating between posts and earth or decomposed granite floors that provided covered play space and doubled as teaching space when required. These structures were timber-framed and generally open sided, although some were partially enclosed with timber boards or corrugated galvanised iron sheets. The hipped (or less frequently, gabled) roofs were clad with timber shingles or corrugated iron. Playsheds were a typical addition to state schools across Queensland between c. 1880s and the 1950s, although less frequently constructed after c. 1909, with the introduction of highset school buildings with understorey play areas. Built to standard designs, playsheds ranged in size relative to student numbers. In 1948 the Roadvale State School playshed was partially enclosed with iron sheeting which had come from the recently closed Obum Obum State School's playshed, and in 1956 the playshed floor was concreted.

A major problem that affected the small township of Roadvale was the lack of an efficient water supply. In the late 19th century it had been reported by the school inspector, that "there is no water ... the inhabitants of the scrub have to cart water from the Teviot Brook". By the turn of the century, most residents and businesses had erected water tanks. A crisis unfolded in the town on 29 October 1915, when a fire began in the Humphreys and Tow store on the main street. The district had experienced particularly dry and hot conditions and the fire quickly spread to neighbouring businesses and homes. With water tanks running low, effectively fighting the fire proved challenging, "Roadvale was particularly unfortunate in this matter, as it had not water supply beyond the tanks, and these must have been fairly low from the protracted dry spell". The fire destroyed most of the buildings in the main street including several stores, the Royal Hotel, the Royal Bank and its manager's residence, and a number of houses. Although some of the buildings were rebuilt and businesses re-opened, the township's prominence as a district centre had been diminished.

From as early as the late 19th, and into the 20th century, Arbor Day was celebrated at Roadvale State School with tree planting, sports activities, luncheons in the playshed and dances held at night. The early plantings are no longer extant. Other social and fund-raising events held at the school included concerts, picnics, sports days and fancy-dress balls.

From November 1920 until the end of January 1921, the school was temporarily closed due to a diphtheria outbreak. The district medical officer reported twenty students carrying the disease. Four of the children became sick. The school became a temporary isolation hospital, with the parents of the afflicted children providing the beds and other comforts to the school while the children recovered. A nurse was provided by the Health Department. All four children recovered, and following a thorough sterilisation of the school, it was reopened for the 1921 school year.

Roadvale State School's enrolments remained steady throughout the early 20th century with an average of 30 students enrolled per year. In 1939 the school celebrated its Golden Jubilee (50th anniversary). A committee was formed to organise the celebrations, and in October 1939 an invitation was published in local newspapers, "Roll Up!! Roadvale State School, Golden Jubilee Celebrations ... Past scholars, all friends welcome".

The celebrations were held on Saturday 11 November 1939 and attended by up to 500 people, including 26 original former pupils. Speeches were made by visiting dignitaries including two state parliamentarians and the Chairman of the Boonah Shire Council. A lunch was served in the decorated playshed and a temporary marquee was set up beside it. The local Milbong brass band provided the entertainment. After lunch a roll-call was held, with the names of all the original pupils present read out; speeches were then made. As the day was held on Armistice Day (Remembrance Day), two minutes of silence was observed. Only a few months before the Golden Jubilee, war had again broken out in Europe, and in his speech, EB Maher MLA reflected the community's concern, "Let us hope and pray that Divine Providence will animate the hearts and minds of rulers in Europe, so that the present struggle will come to a speedy end". Ten years later in 1949, the school celebrated its Diamond Jubilee in a similar fashion. For the school's centenary in 1989, celebrations were held at the school on Saturday 11 November, a commemorative plaque placed in the school grounds and a school history published to commemorate the occasion, Roadvale State School Centenary, 1889–1989.

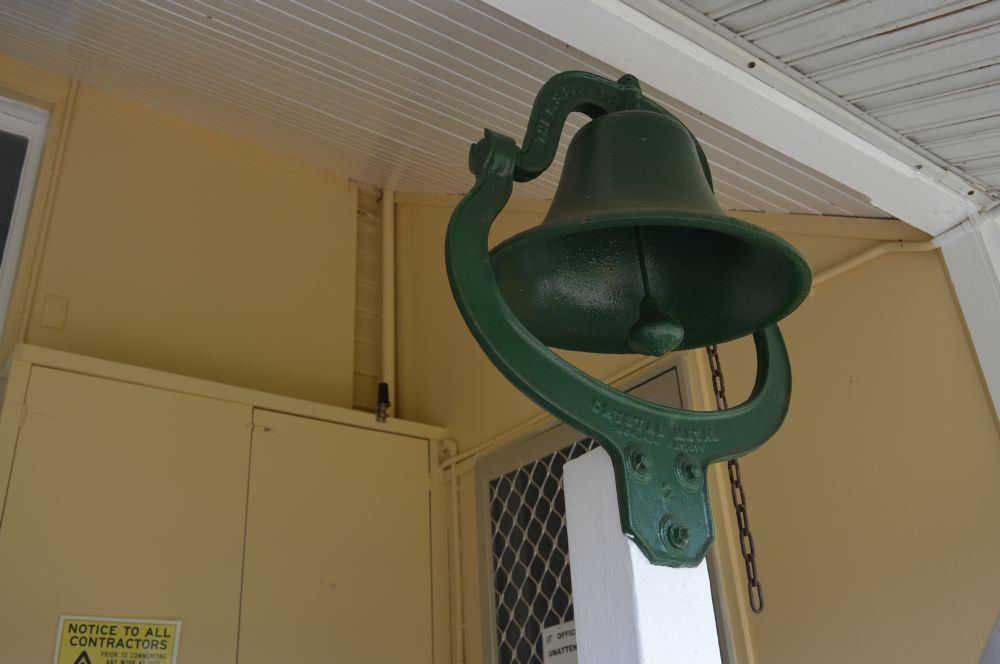
School bell on the front verandah, 2018

The teaching building (called Block A in 2019) remained largely unaltered until 1970 when it had a small enclosure made on its northern verandah for a new store room and library, and all of its windows were altered to increase internal lighting conditions. Banks of awning windows with flat sunhoods replaced the original windows on the gable ends, doubling the window areas here, and banks of glass louvres replaced the windows in the southern verandah wall. The windows of the northern verandah wall were removed and closed over. Designed in 1965, this alteration also included replacing the length of the north verandah balustrade and bag racks. In 1978 the front verandah was further enclosed for a wet area space at the east end and the verandah wall between it and the classroom was opened up. In 1987 the front wall between it and the classroom was opened up.

Other small buildings were added to the site over time. In 1975 a modular building (Block B) was constructed behind Block A and in the 1990s and 2000s two more modular buildings were constructed on the site (Block C and D). In 1982 a teacher's residence (constructed c. 1957) was moved from Nerang State School to Roadvale to the site beside the school. In 2019, the school encompasses a 4.29-hectare (10.6-acre) site, having been extended to the south east in 1994.

Roadvale State School has played an important role in the Roadvale district community since 1889 and continues to do so. Generations of students have been taught there and many social events held in the school's grounds and teaching building since its establishment. The school continues to be a centre for social, sporting and community events.

== Description ==
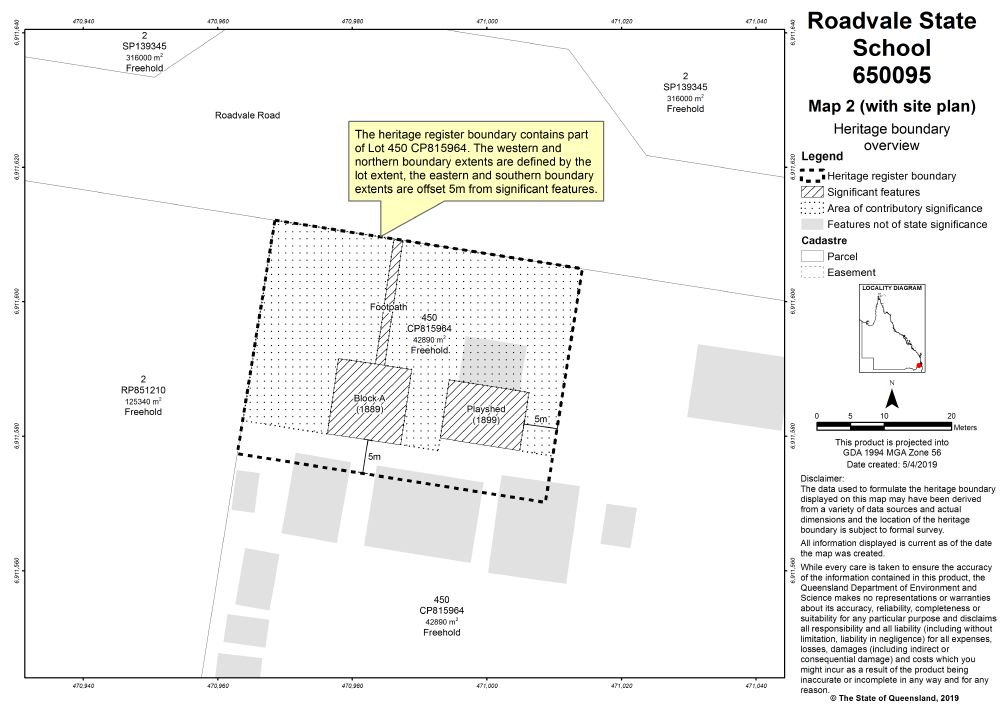
Site map, 2019

Roadvale State School occupies a 4.29ha site in Roadvale, a rural township in the Fassifern Valley, approximately 35 km south of Ipswich The school site is located 2 km east of the Roadvale township centre, and addresses Roadvale Road to the north with rural properties bounding all other sides. The significant school buildings are located in the northwest corner of the site.

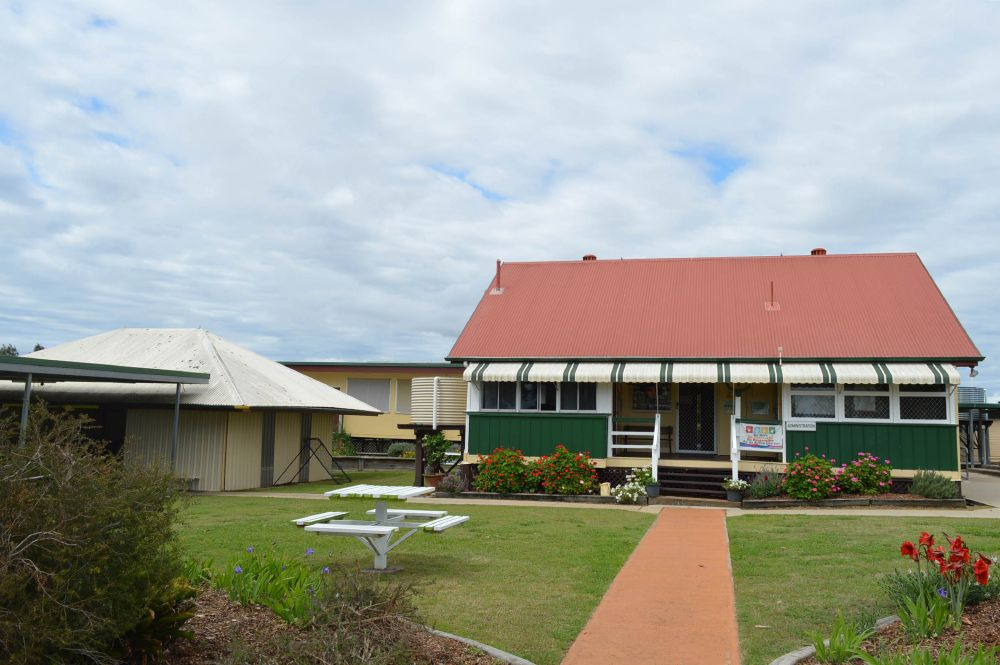
Playshed (left) and school building (right), 2018

The heritage boundary incorporates the northwest corner of the school site (total area of 1629m2). Features of state-level cultural heritage significance are:

- Ferguson Teaching Building (Block A, 1889)
- Playshed (1899)
- Open school yard between significant buildings and Roadvale Road, including a concrete footpath from front entrance to Block A
- Views and open space between Block A, the Playshed and Roadvale Road

The two structures stand in their original locations, in alignment with each other and set back an equal distance from Roadvale Road.

=== Ferguson Teaching Building (1889) ===
Block A is a lowset, single-storey, timber-framed and -clad teaching building, with a gable roof. Along its long sides, the building has front (north) and rear (south) verandahs (now partially and fully enclosed, respectively). The building is accessed via a small timber stair centred with the front verandah, at the end of a footpath aligned with the school entrance.

The interior of the building comprises a former teaching room (now an administration office and staff room, divided by a non-significant part-height partition), with the single former classroom space clearly identifiable. Windows in the gable end walls provide natural light and ventilation to the interior.

Evidence of the changes made over time can be read in the building fabric, particularly at the joins in weatherboards in gable end walls where verandahs have been enclosed, and where original fabric survives from hat room enclosures within the rear verandah.

=== Playshed (1899) ===
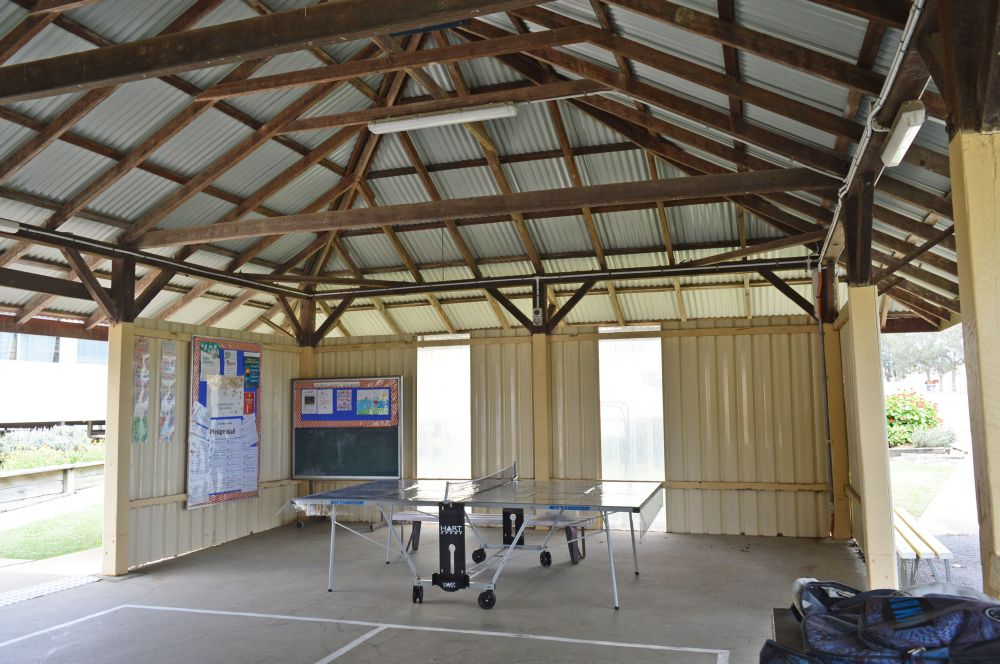
Playshed interior, 2018

The playshed is a 10-post, timber-framed, rectangular sheltered play space, located directly east of and aligned with Block A.

== Heritage listing ==
Roadvale State School was listed on the Queensland Heritage Register on 31 May 2019 having satisfied the following criteria.

The place is important in demonstrating the evolution or pattern of Queensland's history.

Roadvale State School (established in 1889) is important in demonstrating the evolution of state education and its associated architecture in Queensland. The place retains good, representative examples of standard government designs that were architectural responses to prevailing government educational philosophies. These buildings at Roadvale include: a Ferguson teaching building (Block A, 1889) and a playshed (1899), with play areas.

The Ferguson-designed, timber Teaching Building demonstrates an early standardised design that sought to address the practicality and comfort of school buildings; with later modifications that improved natural lighting and ventilation.

The playshed is representative of Queensland Government's recognition of the importance of play in the education of children.

The place is important in demonstrating the principal characteristics of a particular class of cultural places.

Roadvale State School is important in demonstrating the principal characteristics of a Queensland state school, including building designs by the Queensland Government, with play areas. The school is a good example of a modest country school.

The Ferguson Teaching Building (Block A, 1889) is a good, intact example of a Ferguson-designed timber country school building and demonstrates the principal characteristics of its type. These include its lowset form with gable roof; front and rear verandahs; timber-framed and -clad construction; vents to the apexes of gable end walls; lofty classroom of original width and length with coved ceiling; exposed timber tie beams; and early timber joinery.

The playshed (1899) is a good, intact example of a standard 10-post Department of Public Works-designed playshed. It demonstrates the principal characteristics of its type through its hip roof with exposed timber framing, timber posts and braces; and its surrounding of open space.

The place has a strong or special association with a particular community or cultural group for social, cultural or spiritual reasons.

Roadvale State School has a strong and ongoing association with past and present pupils, parents, staff members, and the surrounding community through sustained use since its establishment in 1889. The place is important for its contribution to the educational development of Roadvale, with generations of children taught at the school, and has served as a prominent venue for social interaction and community focus. Contributions to its operations have been made though repeated local volunteer action, donations, and an active Parents and Citizens Association.
