= Beaudesert–Boonah–Fassifern Road =

Road in Queensland, Australia

Beaudesert–Boonah–Fassifern Road Queensland

General information
- Type: Rural road
- Length: 49.9 km (31 mi)
- Route number(s): State Route 90 (Beaudesert – Coulson); State Route 93 (Coulson – Boonah); State Route 90 (Boonah – Fassifern)

Major junctions
- East end: Mount Lindesay Highway, Beaudesert
- Ipswich–Boonah Road; Boonah–Rathdowney Road
- West end: Cunningham Highway, Fassifern

Location(s)
- Major settlements: Coulson, Boonah, Kalbar

Beaudesert–Boonah–Fassifern Road is a non-continuous 49.9 kilometres (31.0 mi) road route in the Scenic Rim region of Queensland, Australia. It has two official names, Beaudesert–Boonah Road and Boonah–Fassifern Road. The route is signed as State Route 90. These roads are joined by a 6.8 kilometres (4.2 mi) section of Ipswich-Boonah Road (State Route 93). Beaudesert–Boonah Road (number 212) is a state-controlled regional road, and Boonah–Fassifern Road (number 214) is also a state-controlled regional road. As part of State Route 90 it provides an alternate route between the Cunningham Highway and the Gold Coast.

== Route Description ==
The Beaudesert–Boonah Road (State Route 90) commences as Bromelton Street at an intersection with the Mount Lindesay Highway in Beaudesert. It runs generally west, crossing the Logan River into Bromelton. It continues through mixed farming land before entering the more heavily timbered locality of Wyaralong. Here, it passes to the south of the Wyaralong Dam before entering a more open country in Coulson. At an intersection with Ipswich–Boonah Road (State Route 93), it turns south, and it runs concurrently with that road to Boonah.

Ipswich–Boonah Road ends at a three-way roundabout intersection in Boonah. State Route 93 continues south as Boonah–Rathdowney Road, and State Route 90 turns west as Boonah–Fassifern Road. From here, the road passes through good farming land, and much of it is irrigated. It runs through or past the localities of Kents Pocket, Templin, Kalbar, Fassifern Valley, Morwincha and Fassifern before reaching the Cunningham Highway, where it ends at a T-junction.

== State Route 90 ==
State Route 90 follows a number of separately named roads from Fassifern to Broadbeach. It is not necessarily the best or the shortest or the quickest route between the two terminals. It was proclaimed as a State Route because, at the time, it was the most convenient route for many users. It is also an example of why motorists in unfamiliar territory should follow a designated route rather than rely on a vehicle navigation system, which may direct them onto less suitable alternative roads.

The route follows Boonah–Fassifern Road east from Fassifern to Boonah, where it turns north-east on Ipswich–Boonah Road. It follows this to Coulson, where it turns east on Beaudesert–Boonah Road. This leads to Beaudesert, where it turns north-east on Mount Lindesay Highway to Beaudesert–Nerang Road, where it turns south-east. It follows this to Nerang, where it turns south-east on Nerang Connection Road. This leads into Nerang–Broadbeach Road, which follows to Broadbeach.

== Road condition ==
The road is fully sealed. Beaudesert–Boonah Road has a distance of about 3.3 kilometres (2.1 mi) with an incline greater than 5%. Boonah–Fassifern Road has about 2 kilometres (1.2 mi) greater than 5%.

== History ==
Beaudesert pastoral run was established as a sheep station about 1842, and Bromelton run was settled in the same year. The first school in Bromelton opened in 1880, indicating an increase in population resulting from closer settlement.

Wyaralong was divided between the former shires of Boonah and Beaudesert. Adjoining properties on either side of the shire boundary were settled in 1874 and 1875. A marriage in 1890 brought the two properties under one ownership. The Overflow, as it was named, spanned 10,000 acres (4,000 ha) at its peak. It is still a substantial property, known as "The Overflow 1895".

The first school in Coulson, then known as Teviotville, opened in 1881, also indicating closer settlement.

The first pastoral run in the Boonah district was taken up in 1844. From 1868 the large pastoral runs were subdivided and the settlement that became Boonah grew rapidly as new settlers moved in. Land was cleared and farms established in several areas around Boonah. To the east this development went as far as the eastern boundary of the Fassifern pastoral run. Part of this development included a road to service the farms. The first creamery in Boonah was built about 1894.

The Fassifern pastoral run was established in 1846. In 1877, 17,700 acres (7,200 ha) of land was resumed from Fassifern to establish smaller farms. The first school in the Fassifern area was opened in 1879. Templin was settled by German immigrants in the late 1800s. By 1890 sufficient development of small farms had occurred between Fassifern and Boonah that a new town was established. This became the town of Kalbar.

Early roads were cut to enable wheeled vehicle access to the pastoral runs and large freehold properties. As smaller farms were developed the roads were improved and extended until the major commercial centres were linked.

When the Wyaralong Dam was built in 2010 part of the Beaudesert–Boonah Road was realigned and raised. One section runs along an embankment beside the lake.

== Major intersections ==
All distances are from Google Maps. The entire road is in the Scenic Rim local government area.

Location	km	mi	Destinations	Notes
Beaudesert	0	0.0	Mount Lindesay Highway – north–east – Beaudesert, Jimboomba – south–west – Laravale, Rathdowney	Eastern end of Beaudesert–Boonah Road (State Route 90)
Coulson	31.6	19.6	Ipswich–Boonah Road – north – Milbong – south – Boonah	Northern concurrency terminus with State Route 93. Road turns south.
Boonah	38.4	23.9	Boonah–Rathdowney Road – south – Dugandan, Rathdowney; Boonah–Fassifern Road – west – Fassifern	Southern concurrency terminus with State Route 93. Road turns west.
Fassifern	49.9	31.0	Cunningham Highway – north – Silverdale, Ipswich – south – Aratula, Warwick	Western end of Boonah–Fassifern Road (State Route 90).
1.000 mi = 1.609 km; 1.000 km = 0.621 mi: Concurrency terminus

== See also ==
- List of road routes in Queensland
- List of numbered roads in Queensland
