= Moorang, Queensland =

Moorang
- Suburb
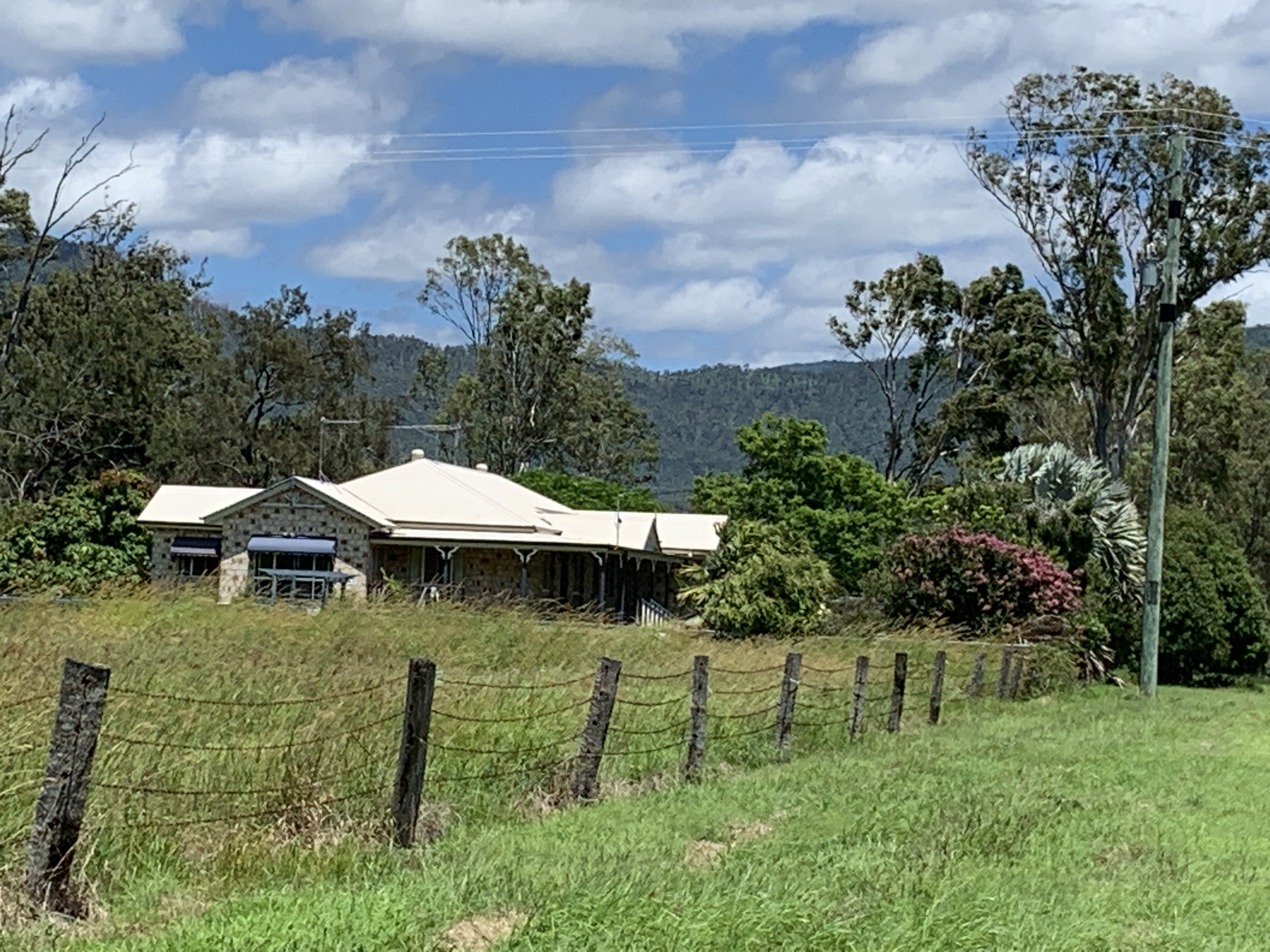
- Farm with mountain range in the background, 2022

- Interactive map of Moorang
- Coordinates: 27.9211°S 152.4513°E
- Country: Australia
- State: Queensland
- LGA: Scenic Rim Region
- Location: 38.6 km (24.0 mi) NW of Boonah, Queensland; 55.9 km (34.7 mi) SW of Ipswich; 76.9 km (47.8 mi) W of Beaudesert; 95.0 km (59.0 mi) SW of Brisbane CBD

Government
  - State electorate: Scenic Rim
  - Federal division: Wright

Area
  - Total: 55.4 km^{2} (21.4 sq mi)

Population
  - Total: 47 (2021 census)
  - Density: 0.848/km^{2} (2.197/sq mi)
- Time zone: UTC+10:00 (AEST)
- Postcode: 4340
Suburbs around Moorang
Thornton	Rosevale	Rosevale
Townson	Moorang	Frazerview
Townson	Tarome	Aratula

Moorang is a rural locality in the Scenic Rim Region, Queensland, Australia.

== Geography ==
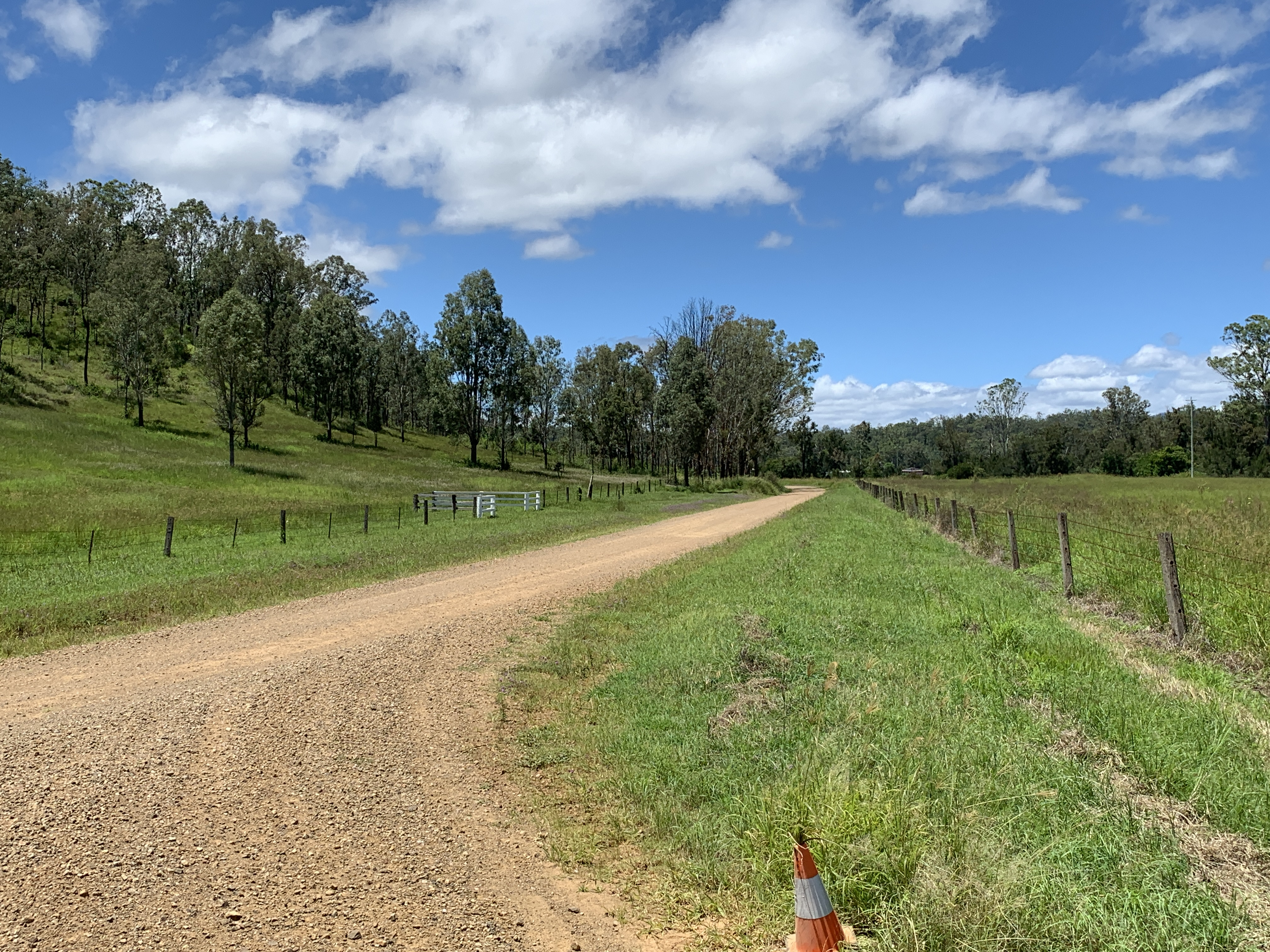
Rosevale Aratula Road passing through Moorang, 2022

The Little Liverpool Range forms the western boundary of the locality. There are two named peaks in the range within Moorang:

- Grass Tree Knob (27.9040°S 152.4052°E) 751 metres (2,464 ft)
- Kangaroo Mountain (27.9309°S 152.4123°E) 755 metres (2,477 ft)

The Bremer River rises in Tarome to the south and flows through the locality exiting to the north (Rosevale).

== History ==
The Yuggera Ugarapul people are the traditional owners of Moorang and the surrounding areas as identified in the map of the successful native title application. Moorang is an Aboriginal word meaning duck.

Moorang Provisional School opened on 29 January 1894 on a 2-acre (0.81 ha) site donated by James English junior in 1891. On 1 January 1909 it became Moorang State School. It closed in 1913 but re-opened in 1914 before permanently closing on 13 December 1920. All buildings were removed from the site and in December 1985 the Queensland Government decided to sell the site. It was on the southern side of Logan Lane (approx 27.9153°S 152.4615°E).

== Demographics ==
In the 2016 census, Moorang had a population of 46 people with a gender distribution of 50% male and 50% female and a median age of 37 (1 year below the national average). 22 private dwellings were recorded with an average of 2 people per household. The average weekly household income was $1,343 ($95 below the national average).

In the 2021 census, Moorang had a population of 47 people with a gender distribution of 56.5% male and 43.5% female and a median age of 49. 19 private dwellings were recorded with an average of 2.6 people per household. The average weekly household income was $1,375.

== Education ==
There are no schools in Moorang. The nearest government primary schools are Warrill View State School in Warrill View to the north-east and Aratula State School in Aratula to the south-east. The nearest government secondary schools are Rosewood State High School in Rosewood to the north-east and Boonah State High School in Boonah to the south-east.
