= Fassifern Valley, Queensland =

Fassifern Valley
- Suburb
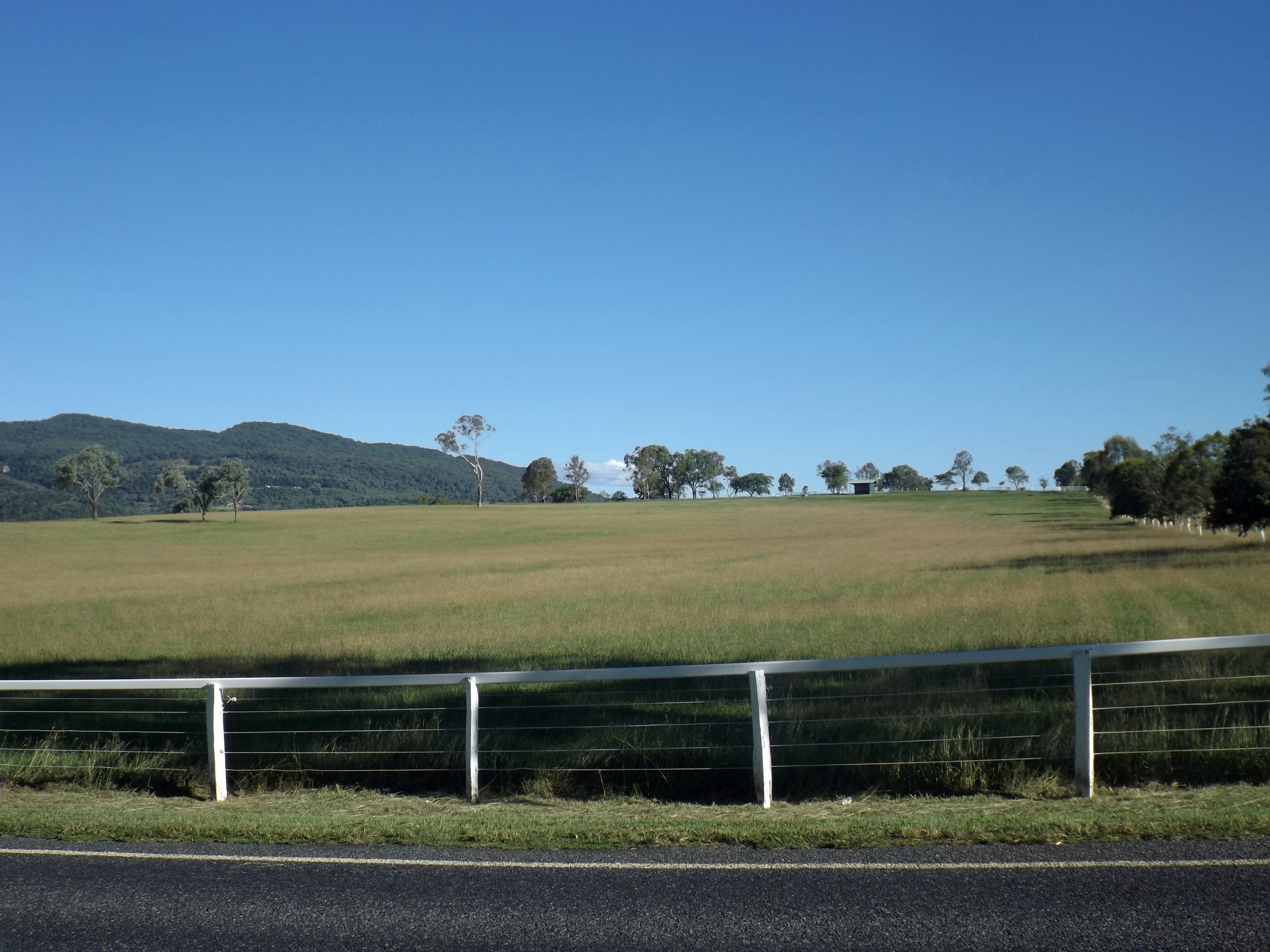
- Fields in Fassifern Valley

- Interactive map of Fassifern Valley
- Coordinates: 27.9722°S 152.6061°E
- Country: Australia
- State: Queensland
- LGA: Scenic Rim Region
- Location: 9.0 km (5.6 mi) WNW of Boonah; 47.0 km (29.2 mi) SW of Ipswich; 47.3 km (29.4 mi) W of Beaudesert; 90.3 km (56.1 mi) SW of Brisbane

Government
  - State electorate: Scenic Rim
  - Federal division: Wright

Area
  - Total: 8.8 km^{2} (3.4 sq mi)

Population
  - Total: 112 (2021 census)
  - Density: 12.73/km^{2} (33.0/sq mi)
- Time zone: UTC+10:00 (AEST)
- Postcode: 4309
Suburbs around Fassifern Valley
Fassifern	Kalbar	Kalbar
Morwincha	Fassifern Valley	Templin
Charlwood	Charlwood	Mount French

Fassifern Valley is a rural locality in the Scenic Rim Region, Queensland, Australia. In the 2021 census, Fassifern Valley had a population of 112 people.

== Geography ==
Reynolds Creek forms the western boundary.

The Boonah–Fassifern Road (State Route 90) runs through from east to west.

Tenders were called in October 1905 to erect a provisional school. Fassifern Valley Provisional School opened on 13 March 1906. It became Fassifern State School on 1 January 1909. It closed in 1958 and its students transferred to Engelsburg State School in Kalbar (later renamed Kalbar State School). It was at 16 Tutin Road (27.9697°S 152.6085°E).

The first stage of the Mount Edwards railway line reached Engelsburg (now Kalbar) on 17 April 1916, but it was not until 7 October 1922 that the second and final stage of the line opened, including the Fassifern Valley railway station on Charlwood Road (now Lake Moogerah Road, 27.97297°S 152.59979°E). The Mount Edwards railway line closed on 1 November 1960.

In the 2016 census, Fassifern Valley had a population of 91 people. The locality contains 41 households, in which 56.0% of the population are males and 44.0% of the population are females with a median age of 41, 3 years above the national average. The average weekly household income is $1,145, $293 below the national average.

== Demographics ==
In the 2016 census, Fassifern Valley had a population of 91 people.

In the 2021 census, Fassifern Valley had a population of 112 people.

== Education ==
There are no schools in Fassifern Valley. The nearest government primary schools are Kalbar State School in neighbouring Kalbar to the north and Aratula State School in Aratula to the south-west. The nearest government secondary school is Boonah State High School in Boonah to the south-east.
