= Fassifern =

Fassifern may refer to:

- Fassifern, New South Wales
- Fassifern, Queensland
- Fassifern, Ontario
- Electoral district of Fassifern, Queensland
