= Clumber, Queensland =

Clumber
- Suburb
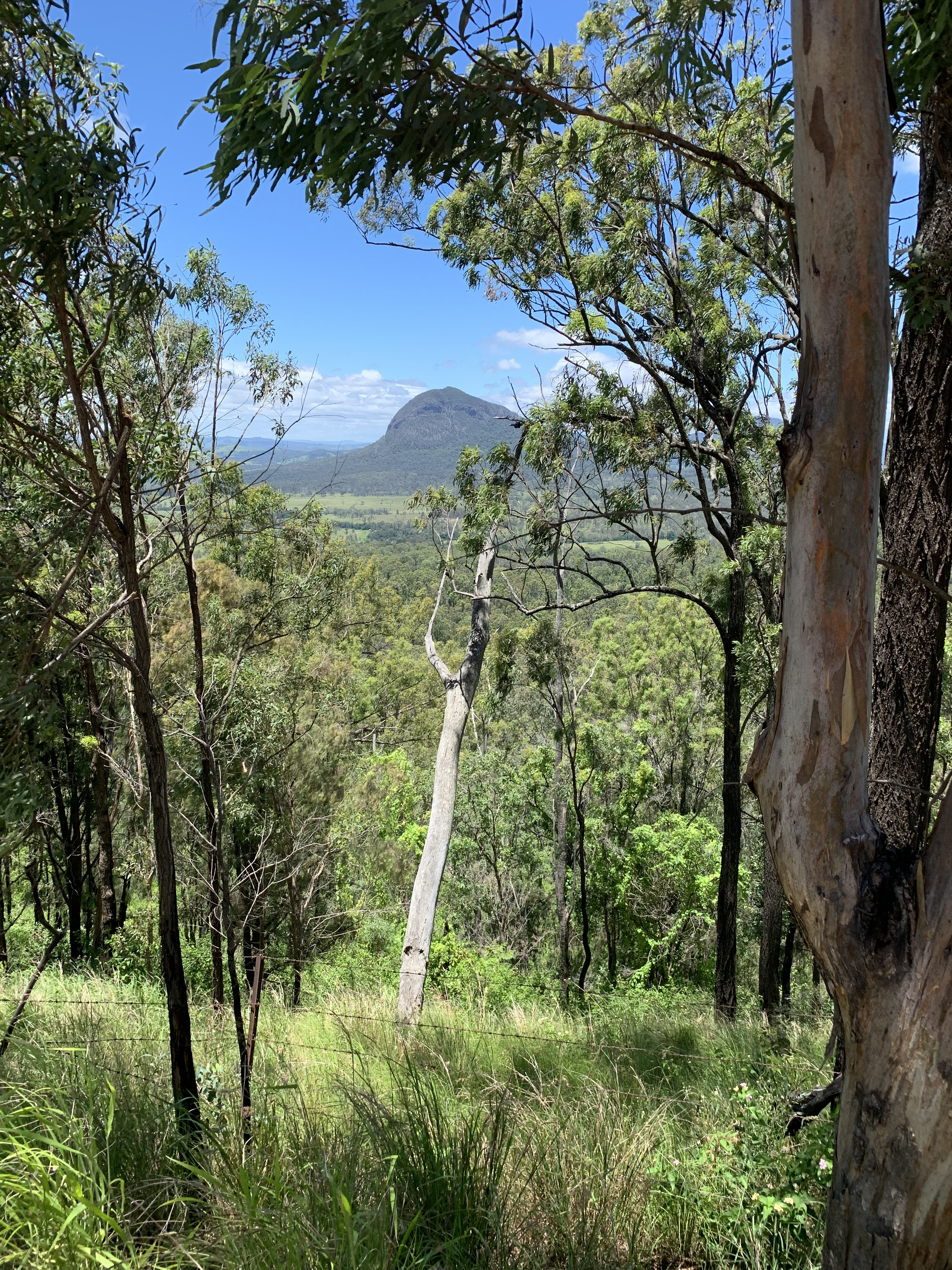
- Looking from Spicers Gap Road across Clumber to Mount Greville, 2022

- Interactive map of Clumber
- Coordinates: 28.0797°S 152.4547°E
- Country: Australia
- State: Queensland
- LGA: Scenic Rim Region
- Location: 27.3 km (17.0 mi) SW of Boonah; 63.5 km (39.5 mi) SW of Ipswich; 65.7 km (40.8 mi) WSW of Beaudesert; 103 km (64 mi) SW of Brisbane CBD

Government
  - State electorate: Scenic Rim
  - Federal division: Wright

Area
  - Total: 56.3 km^{2} (21.7 sq mi)

Population
  - Total: 91 (2021 census)
  - Density: 1.616/km^{2} (4.186/sq mi)
- Time zone: UTC+10:00 (AEST)
- Postcode: 4309
Suburbs around Clumber
Tarome	Tarome	Mount Edwards
Tregony	Clumber	Moogerah
Swanfels	Emu Vale	Moogerah

Clumber is a rural locality in the Scenic Rim Region, Queensland, Australia. In the 2021 census, Clumber had a population of 91 people.

== Geography ==
Clumber has the following mountains, five of them on the Great Dividing Range (from north to south):

- Mount Mathieson (28.0644°S 152.4230°E)
- Mount Alphen (28.0759°S 152.4295°E) 683 metres (2,241 ft)
- Spicers Peak (also known as Barguggan) (28.0986°S 152.4022°E) 1,222 metres (4,009 ft)
- Cuthbertson Peaks (28.1042°S 152.4127°E)
- Double Top (28.1135°S 152.4117°E) 1,150 metres (3,770 ft)

while Browne Hill (28.0846°S 152.4735°E) rising to 355 metres (1,165 ft) is in the east of the locality.

Spicers Gap (also known as Calloongpah) is a mountain pass over the Great Dividing Range. (28.0852°S 152.4176°E); it lie between Mount Alphen and Spicers Peak.

== History ==
On 23 April 1890, a railway survey party exploring the route to connect the Maryvale railway line with the Mount Edwards railway line to create the Via Recta railway line named Mount Mathieson after John Mathieson, the Queensland Commissioner for Railways.

In 2001, Cuthbertson Peaks were named after Jim Cuthbertson, for his contributions to the Scenic Rim district. He was a member of the Brisbane Bushwalkers Club.

== Demographics ==
In the 2016 census, Clumber had a population of 60 people. The locality contains 37 households, in which 48.3% of the population are males and 51.7% of the population are females with a median age of 54, 16 years above the national average. The average weekly household income is $1,187, $251 below the national average.

In the 2021 census, Clumber had a population of 91 people.

== Education ==
There are no schools in Clumber. The nearest government primary school is Aratula State School in Aratula to the north-east. The nearest government secondary school is Boonah State High School in Boonah to the north-east.

== Attractions ==
Governors Chair Lookout is a tourist attraction (28.0862°S 152.4186°E).
