= Morwincha, Queensland =

Morwincha
- Suburb
- Interactive map of Morwincha
- Coordinates: 27.9700°S 152.5780°E
- Country: Australia
- State: Queensland
- LGA: Scenic Rim Region
- Location: 12.9 km (8.0 mi) W of Boonah; 51.0 km (31.7 mi) SSW of Ipswich; 51.2 km (31.8 mi) W of Beaudesert; 90.1 km (56.0 mi) SW of Brisbane CBD

Government
  - State electorate: Scenic Rim
  - Federal division: Wright

Area
  - Total: 3.8 km^{2} (1.5 sq mi)

Population
  - Total: 35 (2021 census)
  - Density: 9.21/km^{2} (23.9/sq mi)
- Time zone: UTC+10:00 (AEST)
- Postcode: 4309
Suburbs around Morwincha
Frazerview	Fassifern	Fassifern Valley
Aratula	Morwincha	Fassifern Valley
Aratula	Charlwood	Charlwood

Morwincha is a rural locality in the Scenic Rim Region, Queensland, Australia. In the 2021 census, Morwincha had a population of 35 people.

== Geography ==
Reynolds Creek, a tributary of Warrill Creek, forms the eastern boundary, while Washpool Gully, another tributary, flows through the north-western corner.

The Cunningham Highway runs along the western boundary, while the Boonah–Fassifern Road (State Route 90) runs along the northern.

== History ==
The locality takes its name from the former Morwincha railway station on the Mount Edwards railway line, which was named by the Queensland Railways Department on 5 February 1915. Morwincha is thought to be an Aboriginal word; its meaning is unknown.

The Mount Edwards line opened in 1922 as part of the Via Recta railway from Brisbane to Sydney. It was to connected to the Maryvale railway line on the Darling Downs, which was also built for the Via Recta. The final stage between Maryvale and Mount Edwards was never built. The Mount Edwards line closed on 1 November 1960. The Morwincha railway station was on Morwincha Road (27.97299°S 152.57734°E).

== Demographics ==
In the 2016 census, Morwincha had a population of 30 people. The locality contained 14 households, in which 51.6% of the population were males and 48.4% of the population were females with a median age of 50, 12 years above the national average. The average weekly household income was $899, $539 below the national average.

In the 2021 census, Morwincha had a population of 35 people.

== Education ==
There are no schools in Morwincha. The nearest government primary schools are Aratula State School in neighbouring Aratula to the south-west and Kalbar State School in Kalbar to the north-east. The nearest government secondary school is Boonah State High School in Boonah to the east.
