= Charlwood, Queensland =

Charlwood
- Suburb
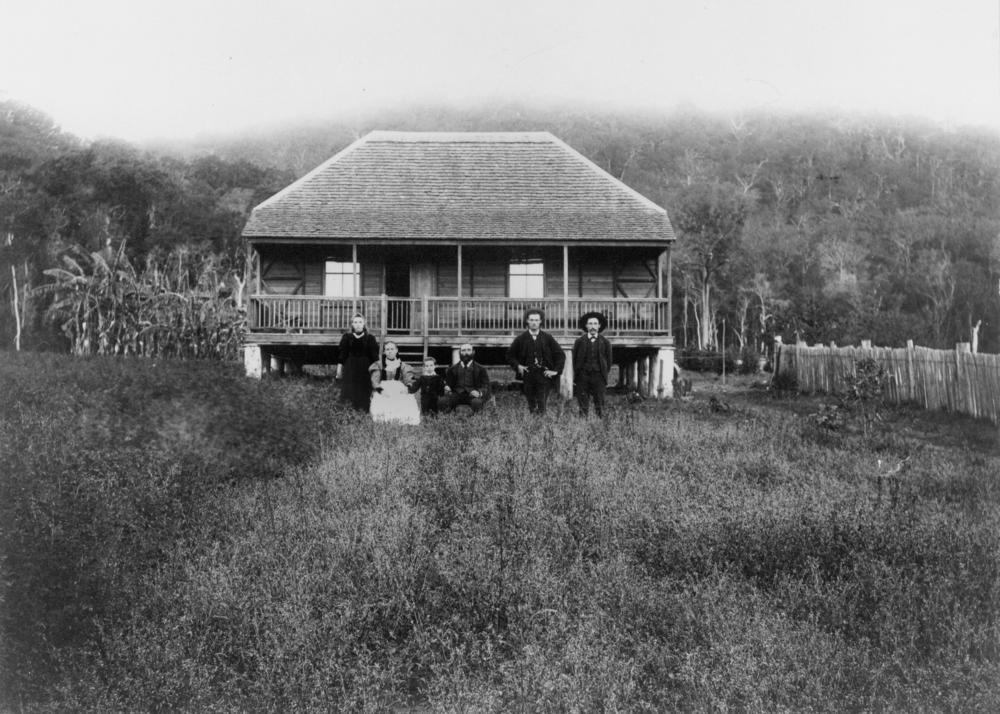
- Jensen house, Charlwood, 1898. Pictured are Mr and Mrs Reiner Jensen with sons Peter and Claus, daughter Ida (Mrs Turner) and grandson James Turner.

- Interactive map of Charlwood
- Coordinates: 28.0108°S 152.5772°E
- Country: Australia
- State: Queensland
- LGA: Scenic Rim Region
- Location: 9.7 km (6.0 mi) SW of Kalbar; 14.9 km (9.3 mi) W of Boonah; 53.2 km (33.1 mi) W of Beaudesert; 94.4 km (58.7 mi) SW of Brisbane CBD

Government
  - State electorate: Scenic Rim
  - Federal division: Wright

Area
  - Total: 24.6 km^{2} (9.5 sq mi)

Population
  - Total: 146 (2021 census)
  - Density: 5.93/km^{2} (15.37/sq mi)
- Time zone: UTC+10:00 (AEST)
- Postcode: 4309
Suburbs around Charlwood
Aratula	Morwincha	Fassifern Valley
Mount Edwards	Charlwood	Mount French
Moogerah	Mount Alford	Bunjurgen

Charlwood is a rural locality in the Scenic Rim Region, Queensland, Australia. In the 2021 census, Charlwood had a population of 146 people.

== Geography ==
Most of Charlwood is approximately 100–150 metres above sea level and predominantly used for farming and grazing. In the south-west edge of the locality are the lower slopes of Little Mount Edwards. In the eastern edge of the locality are the lower slopes of Mount French. Reynolds Creek flows from Lake Moogerah in the south-west of neighbouring Moogerah through to the north of the locality into Morwincha and Fassifern Valley and ultimately into the Bremer River.

== History ==
The Charlwood Provisional School opened on 20 January 1897. It became Charlwood State School on 1 January 1909. It closed in August 1958. The students were transferred to Engelburg State School in Kalbar (later renamed Kalbar State School). The school was at 748 Lake Moogerah Road (28.0165°S 152.5679°E).

In 1909, a German Baptist Church opened in Charlwood.

A Methodist Church was under construction in Charlwood in 1909.

== Demographics ==
In the 2016 census, Charlwood had a population of 139 people. The locality contained 73 households, in which 56.6% of the population were males and 43.4% of the population were females with a median age of 49, 11 years above the national average. The average weekly household income was $880, $558 below the national average. None of Charlwood's population was of Aborigional or Torres Strait Islander descent. 57.3% of the population aged 15 or over was either registered or de facto married, while 42.7% of the population was not married. 22.3% of the population was attending some form of a compulsory education. The most common nominated ancestries were English (28.8%), Australian (24.7%) and German (18.8%), while the most common country of birth was Australia (82.4%), and the most commonly spoken language at home was English (89.8%). The most common nominated religions were No religion (27.3%), Catholic (14.7%) and Lutheran (11.2%). The most common occupation was a manager (36.1%) and the majority/plurality of residents worked 40 or more hours per week (61.5%).

In the 2021 census, Charlwood had a population of 146 people.

== Education ==
There are no schools in Charlwood. The nearest government primary schools are Aratula State School in neighbouring Aratula to the north-west and Mount Alford State School in neighbouring Mount Alford to the south. The nearest government secondary school is Boonah State High School in Boonah to the north-east.

== Attractions ==
Yarramalong Recreation Centre is a camping and outdoor recreation centre at 688 Lake Moogerah Road (28.0117°S 152.5698°E).
