= Mount Edwards, Queensland =

Mount Edwards
- Suburb
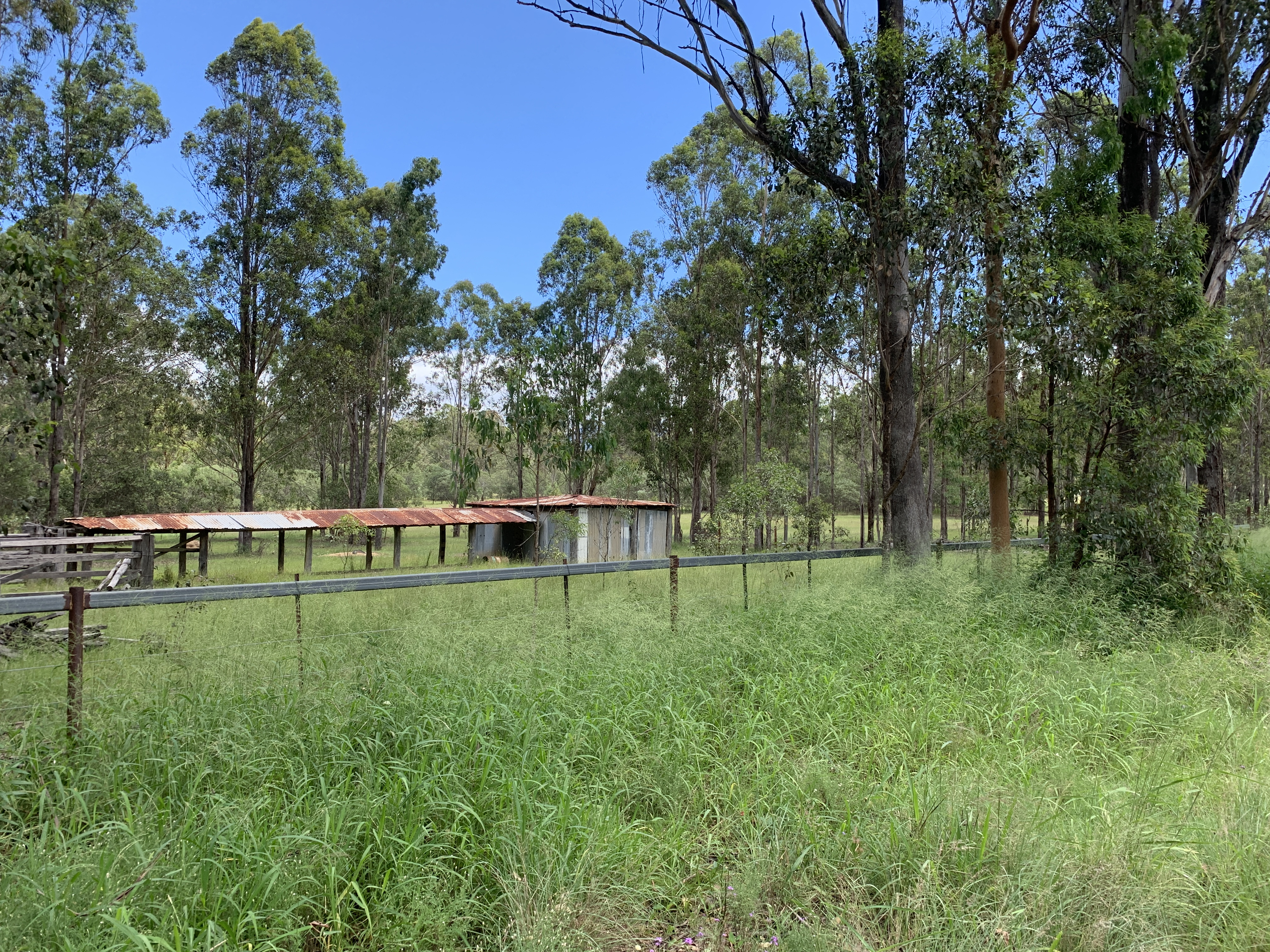
- Farm in Mount Edwards, 2022

- Interactive map of Mount Edwards
- Coordinates: 28.0163°S 152.5269°E
- Country: Australia
- State: Queensland
- LGA: Scenic Rim Region
- Location: 21.3 km (13.2 mi) W of Boonah; 57.5 km (35.7 mi) SW of Ipswich; 59.7 km (37.1 mi) W of Beaudesert; 96.6 km (60.0 mi) SW of Brisbane CBD

Government
  - State electorate: Scenic Rim
  - Federal division: Wright

Area
  - Total: 14.5 km^{2} (5.6 sq mi)

Population
  - Total: 60 (2021 census)
  - Density: 4.1/km^{2} (10.7/sq mi)
- Time zone: UTC+10:00 (AEST)
- Postcode: 4309
Suburbs around Mount Edwards
Tarome	Aratula	Aratula
Tarome	Mount Edwards	Charlwood
Clumber	Moogerah	Moogerah

Mount Edwards is a rural locality in the Scenic Rim Region, Queensland, Australia. In the 2021 census, Mount Edwards had a population of 60 people.

== Geography ==
The locality has the following named peaks:

- Mount Edwards (Indigenous name: Moogerah) (28.0129°S 152.5421°E) 634 metres (2,080 ft)
- Little Mount Edwards (28.0182°S 152.5547°E) 362 metres (1,188 ft)

Most of the north, centre and east of the locality is occupied by the mountain Mount Edwards. Its upper parts are within the Moogerah Peaks National Park; its lower slopes remain undeveloped bushland. The south and west of the locality is farm land, mostly used for grazing on native vegetation.

The Cunningham Highway enters the locality from the north (Aratalua), passes west of the mountain, and exits to the south-west (Tarome/Clumber).

== History ==
The locality takes its name from the mountain Mount Edwards within the locality.

The first stage of the Mount Edwards railway line reached Engelsburg (now Kalbar) on 17 April 1916, but it was not until 7 October 1922 that the second and final stage of the line opened to its terminus Mount Edwards railway station on the southern corner of the Cunningham Highway and Lake Moogerah Road (28.02136°S 152.51578°E). The Mount Edwards railway line closed on 1 November 1960.

== Demographics ==
In the 2016 census, Mount Edwards had a population of 63 people. The locality contains 32 households, in which 46.9% of the population are males and 53.1% of the population are females with a median age of 48, 10 years above the national average. The average weekly household income is $900, $538 below the national average.

In the 2021 census, Mount Edwards had a population of 60 people.

== Education ==
There are no schools in Mount Edwards. The nearest government primary school is Aratula State School in neighbouring Aratula to the north. The nearest government secondary school is Boonah State High School in Boonah to the east.
