= Frazerview, Queensland =

Frazerview
- Suburb
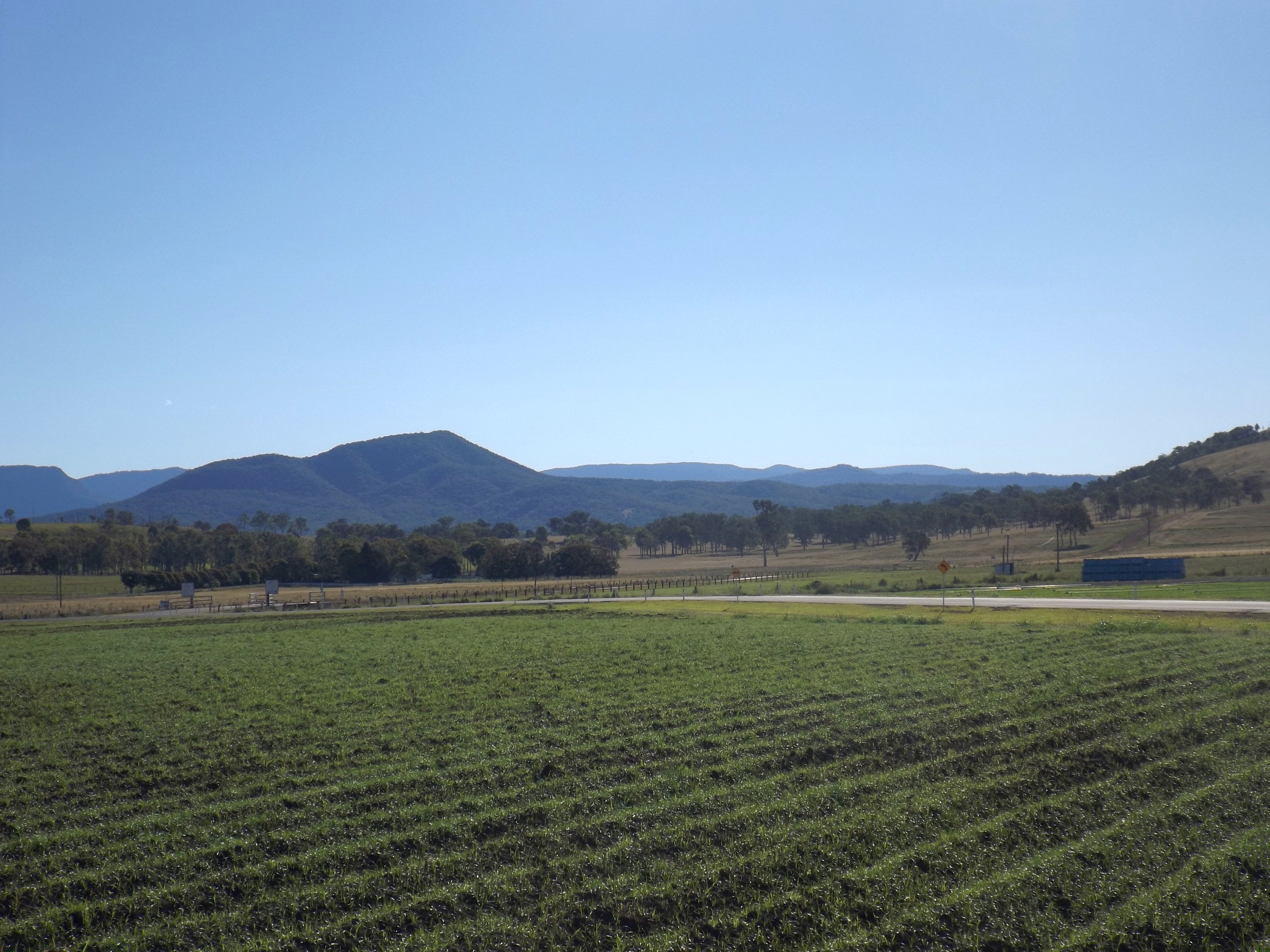
- Crops at Frazerview, 2015

- Interactive map of Frazerview
- Coordinates: 27.9375°S 152.5216°E
- Country: Australia
- State: Queensland
- LGA: Scenic Rim Region
- Location: 13.6 km (8.5 mi) NW of Boonah; 48.4 km (30.1 mi) SW of Ipswich; 51.9 km (32.2 mi) W of Beaudesert; 87.5 km (54.4 mi) SW of Brisbane CBD

Government
  - State electorate: Scenic Rim
  - Federal division: Wright

Area
  - Total: 46.1 km^{2} (17.8 sq mi)

Population
  - Total: 36 (2021 census)
  - Density: 0.781/km^{2} (2.023/sq mi)
- Time zone: UTC+10:00 (AEST)
- Postcode: 4309
Suburbs around Frazerview
Moorang	Rosevale	Silverdale
Moorang	Frazerview	Kalbar
Tarome	Aratula	Fassifern

Frazerview is a rural locality in the Scenic Rim Region, Queensland, Australia. In the 2021 census, Frazerview had a population of 36 people.

== Geography ==
Frazerview is located in the Fassifern Valley farming area to the west of Cunningham Highway. Part of the south-eastern boundary of Frazerview is marked by Warrill Creek, a tributary of the Bremer River. Frazer Creek rises in the north-west of the locality and flows south-east where it becomes a tributary of Warwill Creek (27.95972°S 152.55417°E).

The Cunningham Highway passes briefly through the south-east of the locality, entering from the east (Kalbar) and exiting to the south-east (Fassifern).

Frazerview has the following mountains:

- Kangaroo Mountain in the east of the locality (27.9409°S 152.5555°E) rising to 267 metres (876 ft) above sea level
- Mount Fraser in the west of the locality (27.9417°S 152.4857°E) 597 metres (1,959 ft)

The land use is predominantly grazing on native vegetation with some irrigated farms in the south-east of the locality near to Warrill Creek. The western end of the locality around Mount Fraser is undeveloped bushland.

== History ==
Mount Fraser was named by botanist and explorer Allan Cunningham on 26 August 1828, after Charles Fraser who was the Colonial Botanist of New South Wales from 1821 to 1831. It is presumed that the creek and locality name are derived from the mountain, albeit with a variant spelling.

Frazerview State School was opened on 25 November 1915. Three days later the school was destroyed by fire. It was re-opened one year later and continued to educate children until December 1975 when the school was closed due to low attendance rates with the remaining students transferred to Engelburg State School in Kalbar (later renamed Kalbar State School. It was at 420 Frazerview Road (27.9520°S 152.5569°E).

== Demographics ==
In the 2016 census, Frazerview had a population of 34 people. The locality contained 14 households, in which 56.3% of the population were males and 43.7% of the population were females with a median age of 57, 19 years above the national average. The average weekly household income was $900, $538 below the national average.

In the 2021 census, Frazerview had a population of 36 people.

== Education ==
There are no schools in Frazerview. The nearest government primary schools are Aratula State School in neighbouring Aratula to the south and Kalbar State School in neighbouring Kalbar to the east. The nearest government secondary school is Boonah State High School in Boonah to the south-east.
