= Fassifern, Queensland =

Fassifern
- Suburb
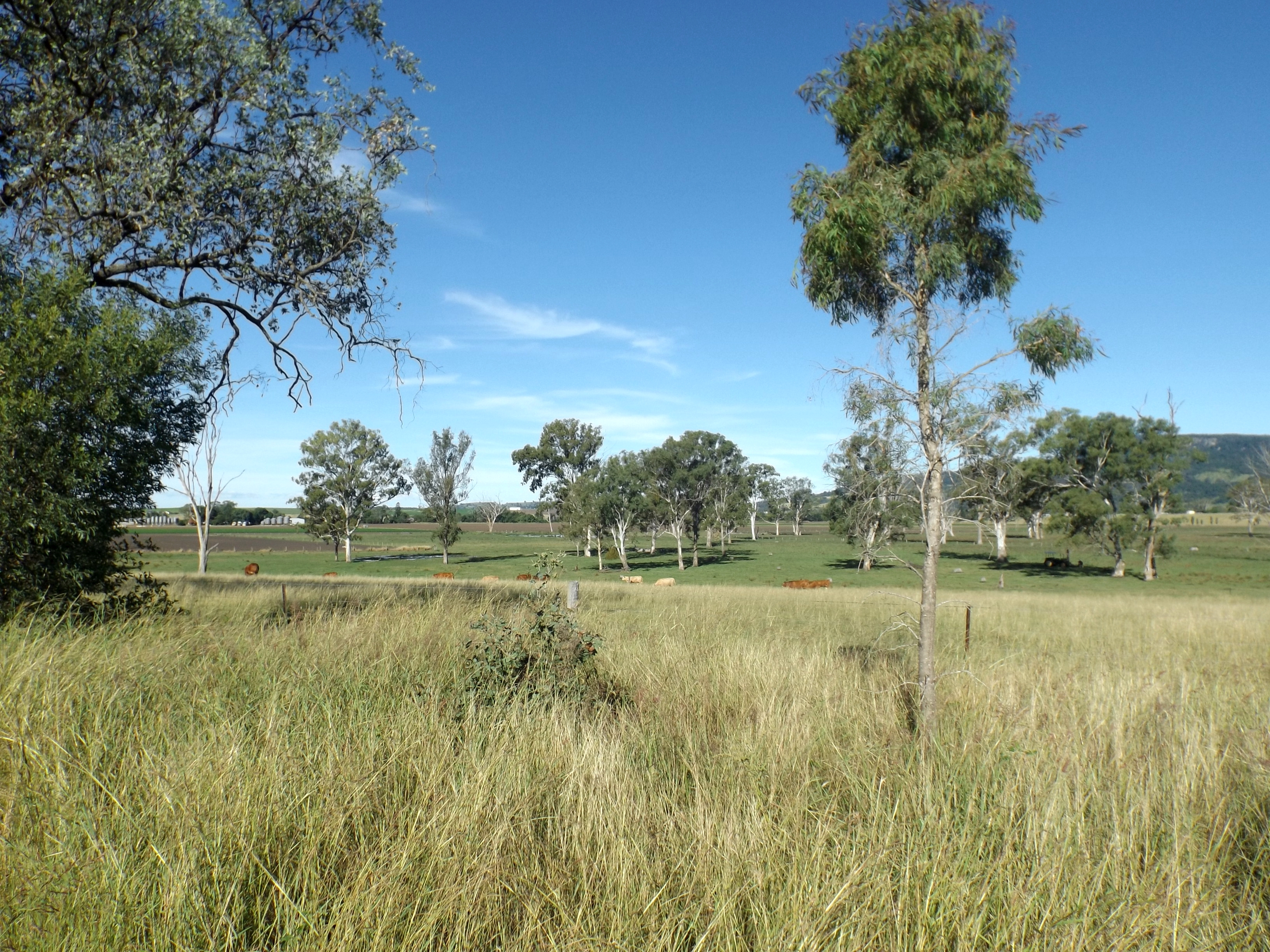
- Pastures at Fassifern.

- Interactive map of Fassifern
- Coordinates: 27.9561°S 152.5880°E
- Country: Australia
- State: Queensland
- LGA: Scenic Rim Region
- Location: 6.4 km (4.0 mi) SW of Kalbar; 12.1 km (7.5 mi) WNW of Boonah; 50.4 km (31.3 mi) W of Beaudesert; 87.8 km (54.6 mi) SW of Brisbane CBD

Government
  - State electorate: Scenic Rim
  - Federal division: Wright

Area
  - Total: 2.0 km^{2} (0.77 sq mi)

Population
  - Total: 18 (2021 census)
  - Density: 9.0/km^{2} (23.3/sq mi)
- Time zone: UTC+10:00 (AEST)
- Postcode: 4309
Suburbs around Fassifern
Kalbar	Kalbar	Kalbar
Frazerview	Fassifern	Fassifern Valley
Aratula	Morwincha	Morwincha

Fassifern is a rural locality in the Scenic Rim Region, Queensland, Australia. In the 2021 census, Fassifern had a population of 18 people.

== Geography ==
Reynolds Creek forms the eastern boundary, while Warrill Creek forms most of the western. Washpool Gully flows through from south-west to north-west, where it joins Warrill Creek.

The Cunningham Highway runs through from north-west to south-west, and Boonah-Fassifern Road (State Route 90) runs east from the highway, forming most of the southern boundary.

The land use is a mix of grazing on native vegetation and crop growing.

== History ==
The name Fassifern comes from a pastoral run name, used in 1846 by pastoralists John Cameron and Macquarie McDonald, possibly named for a place in Scotland called Fassifern.

Fassifern Provisional School opened circa 1879 and closed circa 1887.

== Demographics ==
In the 2016 census, Fassifern had a population of 21 people. The locality contained 12 households, in which 68.4% of the population were males and 31.6% of the population were females with a median age of 50, 12 years above the national average. The average weekly household income was $575, $863 below the national average.

In the 2021 census, Fassifern had a population of 18 people.

== Education ==
There are no schools in Fassifern. The nearest government primary schools are Kalbar State School in neighbouring Kalbar to the north-east and Aratula State School in neighbouring Aratula to the south-west. The nearest government secondary school is Boonah State High School in Boonah to the south-east.
