= Aratula =

- Town
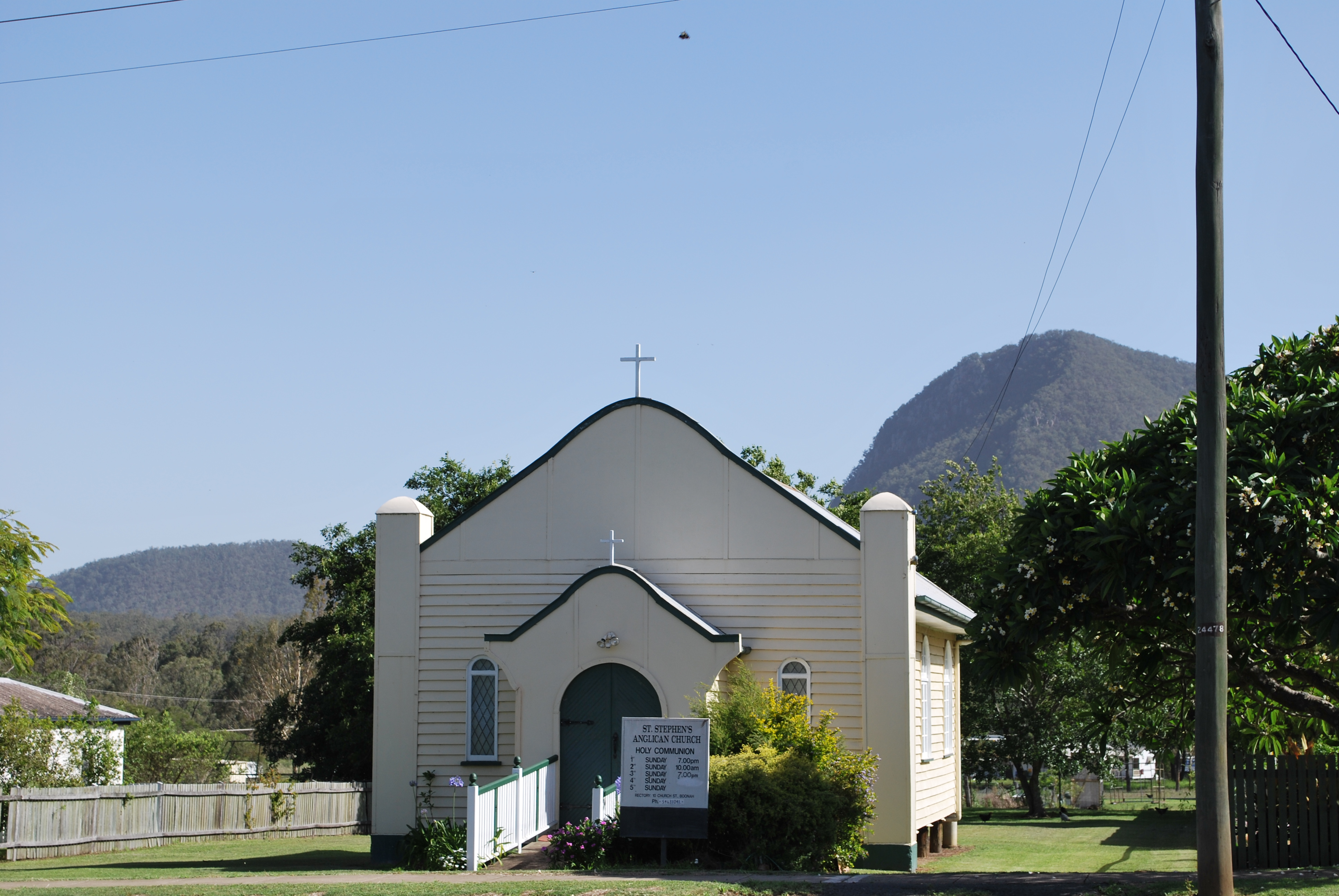
- St Stephen's Anglican church

- Interactive map of Aratula
- Coordinates: 27.9813°S 152.5486°E
- Country: Australia
- State: Queensland
- LGA: Scenic Rim Region
- Location: 16.0 km (9.9 mi) W of Boonah; 52.2 km (32.4 mi) SSW of Ipswich; 54.3 km (33.7 mi) W of Beaudesert; 91.3 km (56.7 mi) SW of Brisbane

Government
  - State electorate: Scenic Rim
  - Federal division: Blair

Area
  - Total: 26.2 km^{2} (10.1 sq mi)

Population
  - Total: 609 (2021 census)
  - Density: 23.24/km^{2} (60.20/sq mi)
- Time zone: UTC+10:00 (AEST)
- Postcode: 4309
Localities around Aratula
Frazerview	Frazerview	Fassifern
Tarome	Aratula	Morwincha
Tarome	Mount Edwards	Charlwood

Aratula is a rural town and locality in the Scenic Rim Region, Queensland, Australia. In the 2021 census, the locality of Aratula had a population of 609 people.

== Geography ==
Aratula is approximately 52 kilometres (30 mi) by road southwest of Ipswich. The Cunningham Highway enters the locality from the north-east (Fassifern), passes through the town, and exits to the south (Mount Edwards).

Warrill Creek enters the locality from the west (Tarome), flows across the north of the locality (and north of the town), exiting to the east (Morwincha). It is a tributary of the Bremer River, then the Brisbane River, flowing into Moreton Bay.

== History ==
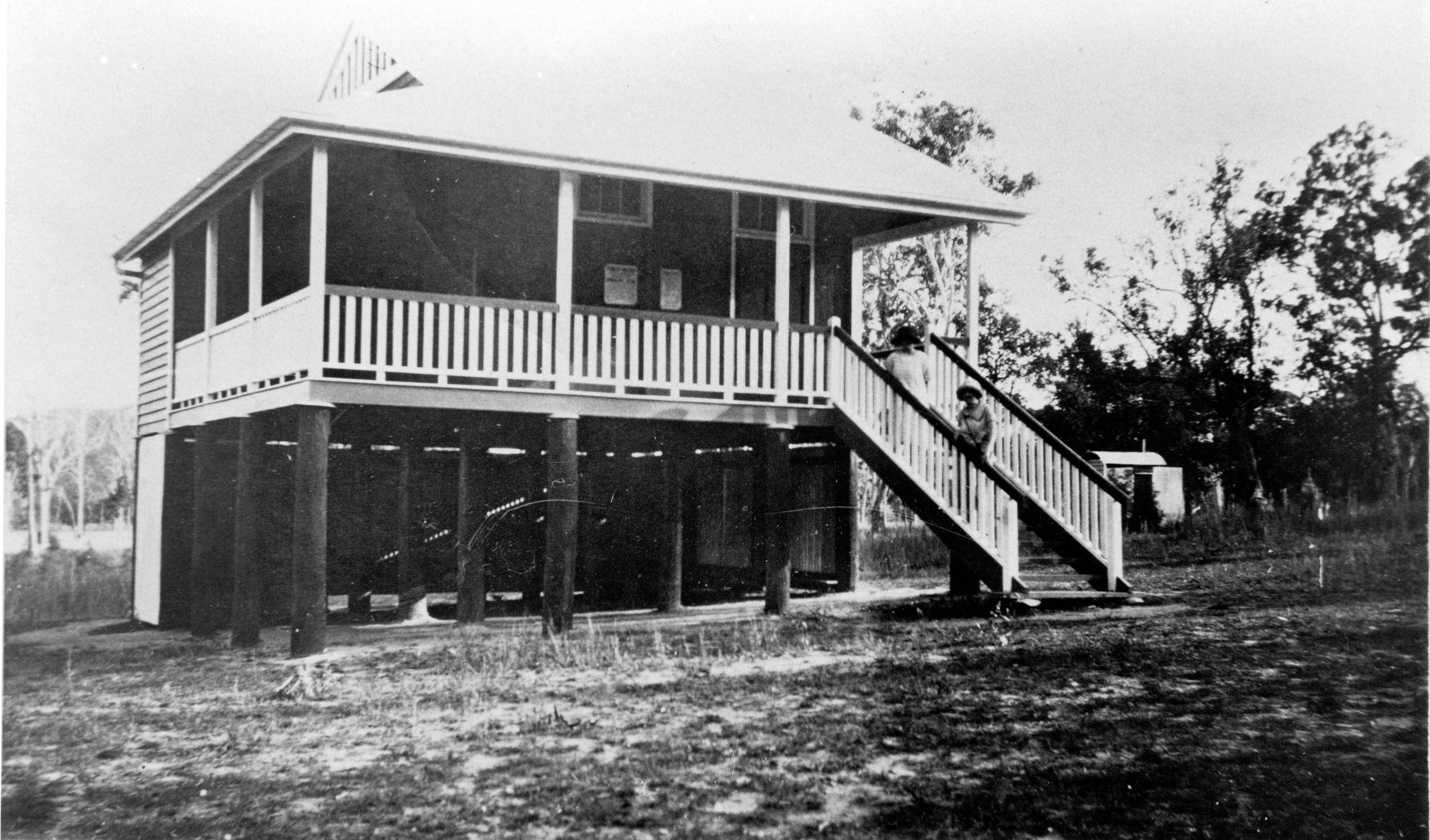
First Aratula State School, circa 1915, before it burned down in 1916

The area was originally known as Carter's Gate, but the name was changed to reflect the railway station name of Aratula.

Carter's Gate Provisional School opened on 29 May 1911. It became a State School on 9 January 1913. The name was changed in August 1913 to Aratula State School. The school burned on either 27 or 28 February 1916; the fire was regarded as suspicious as nearby Mount Fraser State School had burned down four months earlier. The school celebrated its centenary in May 2011.

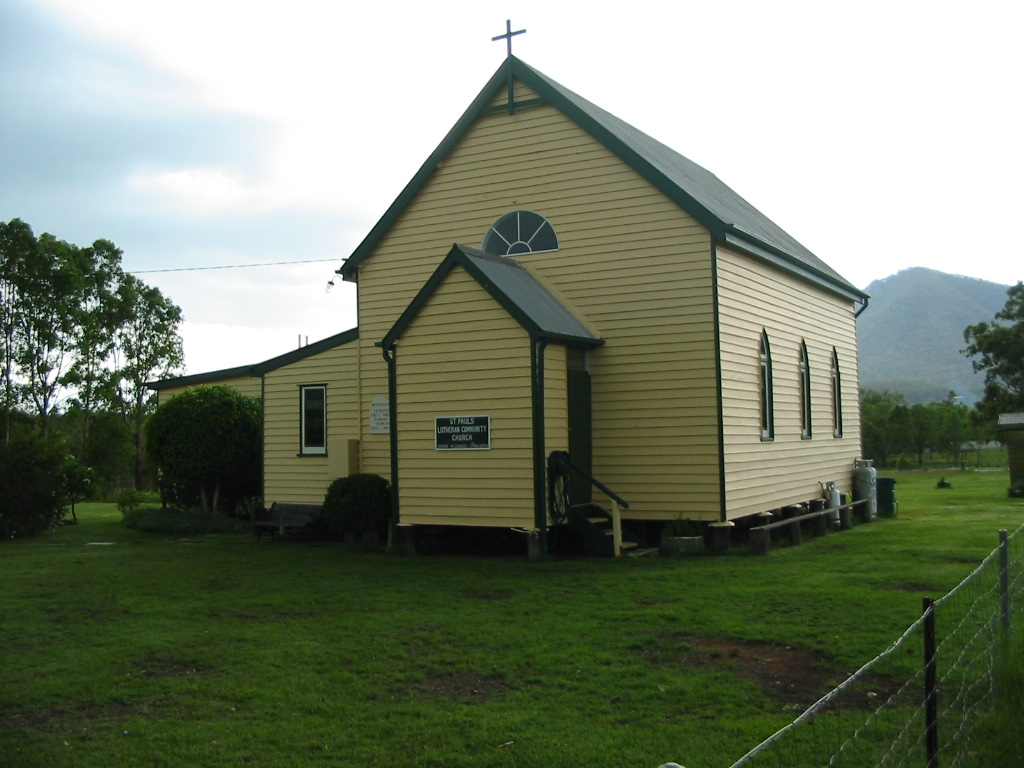
St Pauls Lutheran Church, 2005

St Pauls Lutheran Church opened on 28 March 1914. It closed in 1997. The church building still stands at 57 Elizabeth Street (27.9807°S 152.5427°E). There is a Lutheran cemetery behind the church; the first burial was Hermann Gustav Muller in March 1916.

The first stage of the Mount Edwards railway line reached Engelsburg (now Kalbar) on 17 April 1916, but it was not until 7 October 1922 that the second and final stage of the line opened, including the Aratula railway station on the eastern end of Sawmill Road (27.98252°S 152.55450°E). The Mount Edwards railway line closed on 1 November 1960.

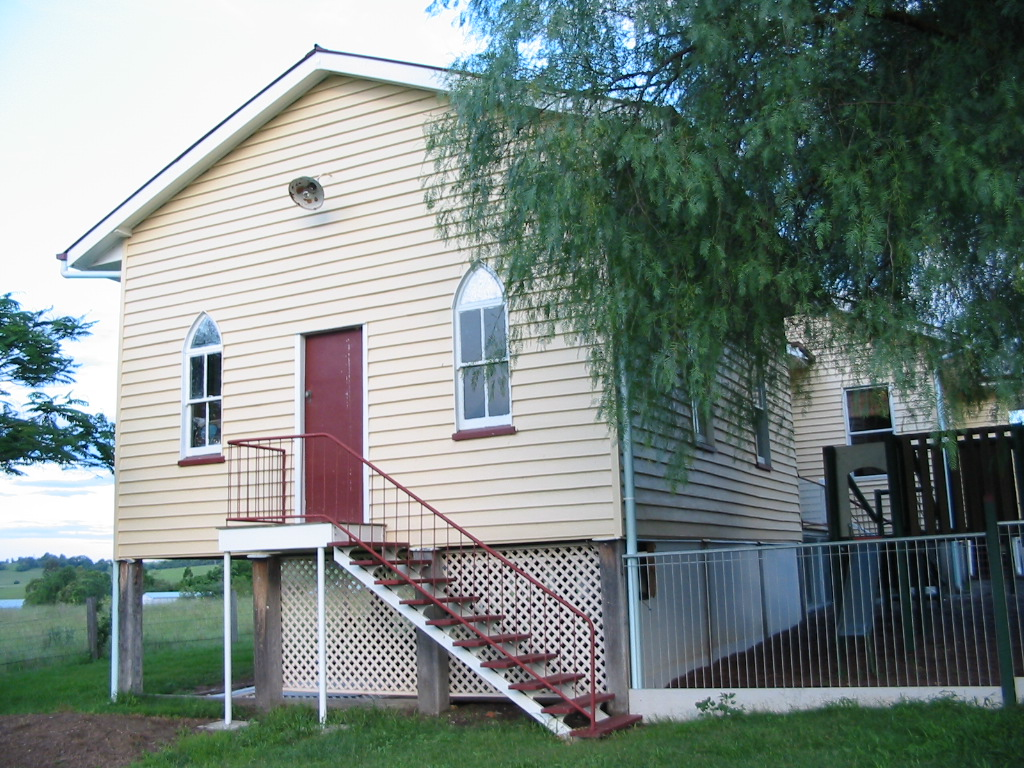
Kalbar Baptist Hall (formerly Aratula Baptist Church), 2005

Aratula Baptist Church opened on Thursday 25 October 1923. It was on the western side of the Cunningham Highway (approx 27.9818°S 152.5479°E). After the church's closure, the church building was relocated in 1972 to the Kalbar Baptist Church to be used as a church hall.

Aratula Post Office opened around 1925 (a receiving office had been open since 1912) and closed in 1987.

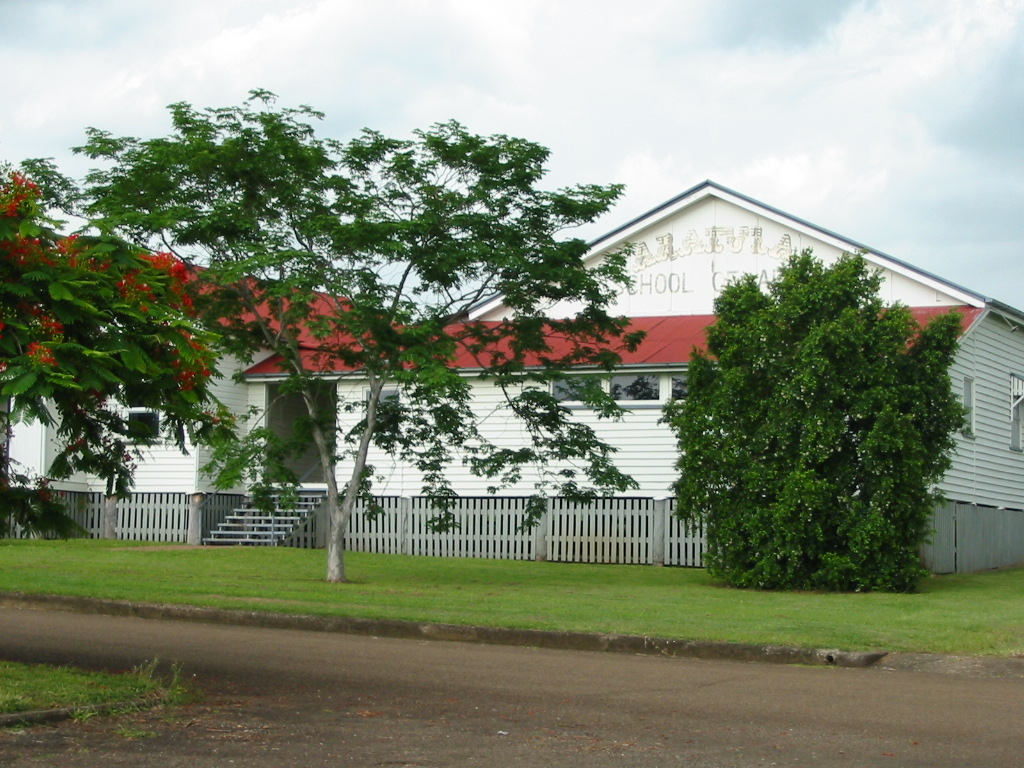
School of Arts, 2005

On 16 April 1926, the Aratula School of Arts was officially opened by Ernest Bell, the local Member of the Queensland Legislative Assembly. A local public holiday was given to celebrate the occasion. The School of Arts was at 26-28 Elizabeth Street (27.9806°S 152.5461°E). The building was sold into private ownership in December 2013 for $115,000.

St Stephen the Martyr Anglican Church was dedicated on Saturday 18 December 1954 by Archbishop of Brisbane Reginald Halse. The first celebration of holy communication was held on St Stephen's Day (Sunday 26 December).

== Demographics ==
In the 2011 census, the locality of Aratula had a population of 505 people.

In the 2016 census, the locality of Aratula had a population of 532 people. The locality contained 150 households, in which 50.5% of the population were males and 49.5% of the population were females with a median age of 42, 4 years above the national average. The average weekly household income was $1,187, $251 below the national average.

In the 2021 census, the locality of Aratula had a population of 609 people.

== Heritage listings ==
Aratula has the following heritage sites:

- St Stephen's Anglican Church, 25 Elizabeth Street

== Education ==
Aratula State School is a government primary (Prep–6) school for boys and girls at 41 Elizabeth Street (27.9808°S 152.5441°E). In 2017, the school had an enrolment of 44 students with 7 teachers (4 full-time equivalent) and 6 non-teaching staff (3 full-time equivalent).

There are no secondary schools in Aratula. The nearest government secondary school is Boonah State High School in Boonah to the east.

== Amenities ==
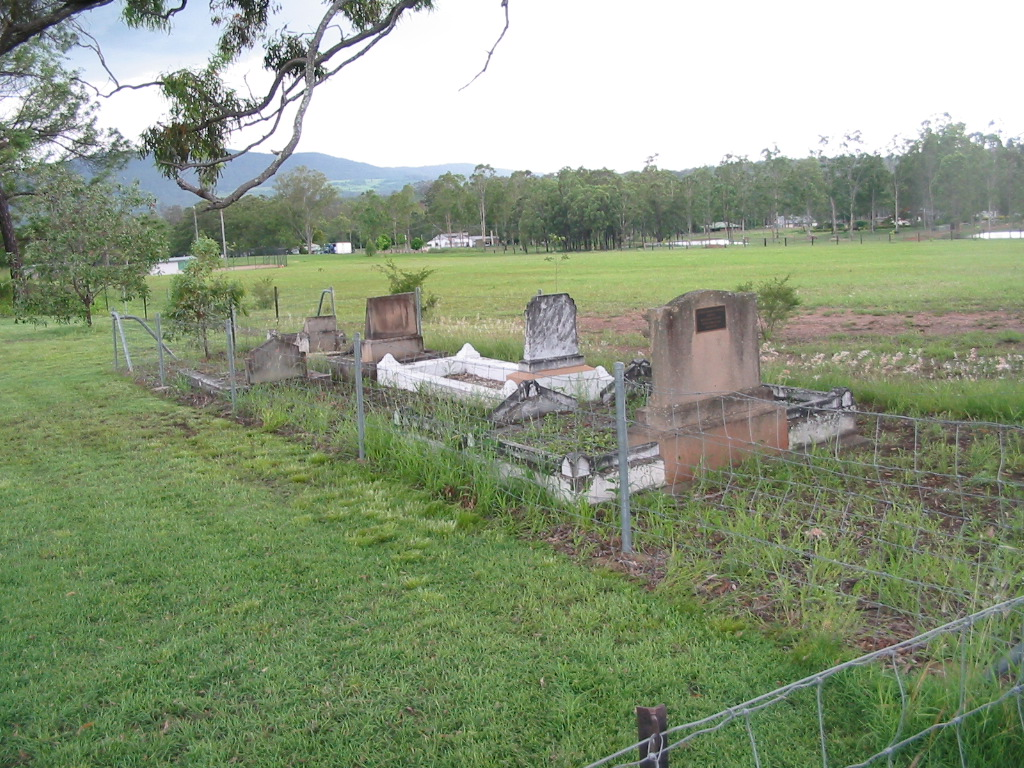
St Pauls Lutheran Cemetery, 2005

St Stephens the Martyr Anglican Church is at 25 Elizabeth Street (27.9813°S 152.5462°E).

== Attractions ==
Local attractions include nearby Moogerah Peaks National Park, Main Range National Park, Lake Moogerah and ballooning.

Aratula is a common rest-stop for travellers coming eastward across the Great Dividing Range. There is a caravan park and a hotel just off the highway. As at January 2026, a McDonald’s restaurant is currently under construction between the hotel and the BP service station.

== See also ==
- Kalbar, Queensland
