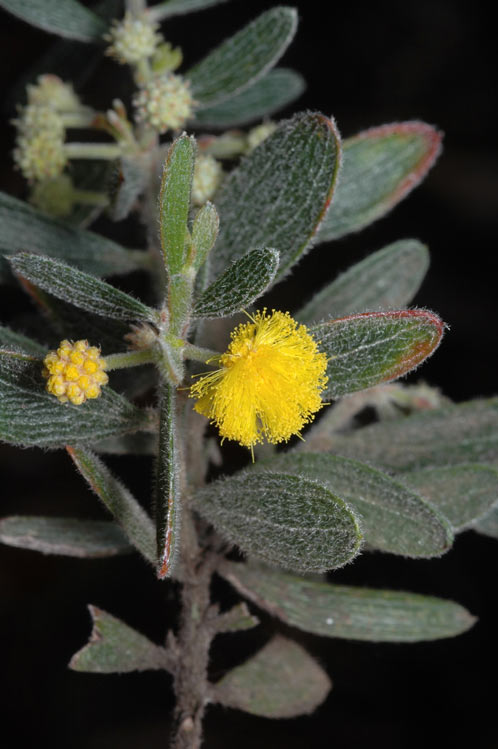
- In the Australian National Botanic Gardens

Scientific classification
- Kingdom: Plantae
- Clade: Tracheophytes
- Clade: Angiosperms
- Clade: Eudicots
- Clade: Rosids
- Order: Fabales
- Family: Fabaceae
- Subfamily: Caesalpinioideae
- Clade: Mimosoid clade
- Genus: Acacia
- Species: A. consobrina

Binomial name
- Acacia consobrina R.S.Cowan & Maslin
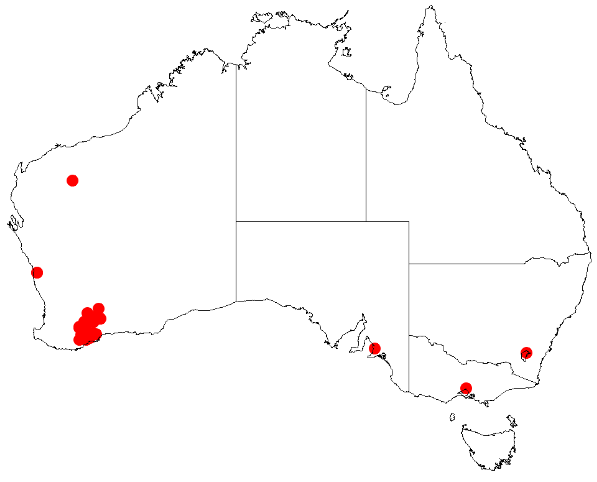
- Occurrence data from AVH

Synonyms
- Racosperma consobrinum (R.S.Cowan & Maslin) Pedley; Acacia ixiophylla auct. non Benth.: Bentham, G. (5 October 1864)

= Acacia consobrina =

Species of legume

Acacia consobrina is a species of flowering plant in the family Fabaceae and is endemic to the south-west of Western Australia. It is a spreading shrub with narrowly lance-shaped or oblong phyllodes, spherical heads of golden yellow flowers and thinly leathery, hairy, wavy pods.

== Description ==
Acacia consobrina is a rounded, spreading shrub that typically grows to a height of 0.5–1.5 m (1 ft 8 in – 4 ft 11 in) and up to 3.5 m (11 ft) wide. It has hairy branchlets with raised or flattened hairs, sometimes golden on young growth. The phyllodes are narrowly lance-shaped or oblong with the narrower end towards the base, mostly 25–40 mm (0.98–1.57 in) long, 4–9 mm (0.16–0.35 in) wide and leathery with many raised veins on each face. The flowers are usually arranged in two spherical heads in racemes 0.5–4.5 mm (0.020–0.177 in) long on peduncles 2–6 mm (0.079–0.236 in) long. Each head is 4–6 mm (0.16–0.24 in) in diameter, with mostly 35 to 45 golden yellow flowers. Flowering occurs from May to September, and the pods are wavy, thinly leathery, up to 30 mm (1.2 in) long and 6–8 mm (0.24–0.31 in) wide with broadly egg-shaped, glossy dark brown seeds 2.5–3.0 mm (0.098–0.118 in) long with an aril near the end.

== Taxonomy ==
Acacia consobrina was first formally described in 1990 by the botanists Richard Sumner Cowan and Bruce Maslin in the journal Nuytsia, from specimens collected 24 km (15 mi) north of Ongerup by Kenneth Newbey in 1964. The specific epithet (consobrina) means 'cousins', meaning the species is distantly related to Acacia flavipila and Acacia ixiophylla.

This species belong in the Section Plurinerves.

== Distribution ==
This species of wattle is native to the Esperance Plains, Mallee and Swan Coastal Plain bioregions of south-western Western Australia where it commonly grows on undulating sandplains and flats in sandy-clay, loamy-clay or clay soils. It is scattered but locally common between Karlgarin, Gnowangerup, Chillinup Nature Reserve and Jerramungup in low Eucalyptus woodland or open shrub mallee communities.

== Conservation status ==
Acacia consobrina is listed as by the Government of Western Australia Department of Biodiversity, Conservation and Attractions.

== See also ==
- List of Acacia species
