= Pratten, Queensland =

Pratten
- Town
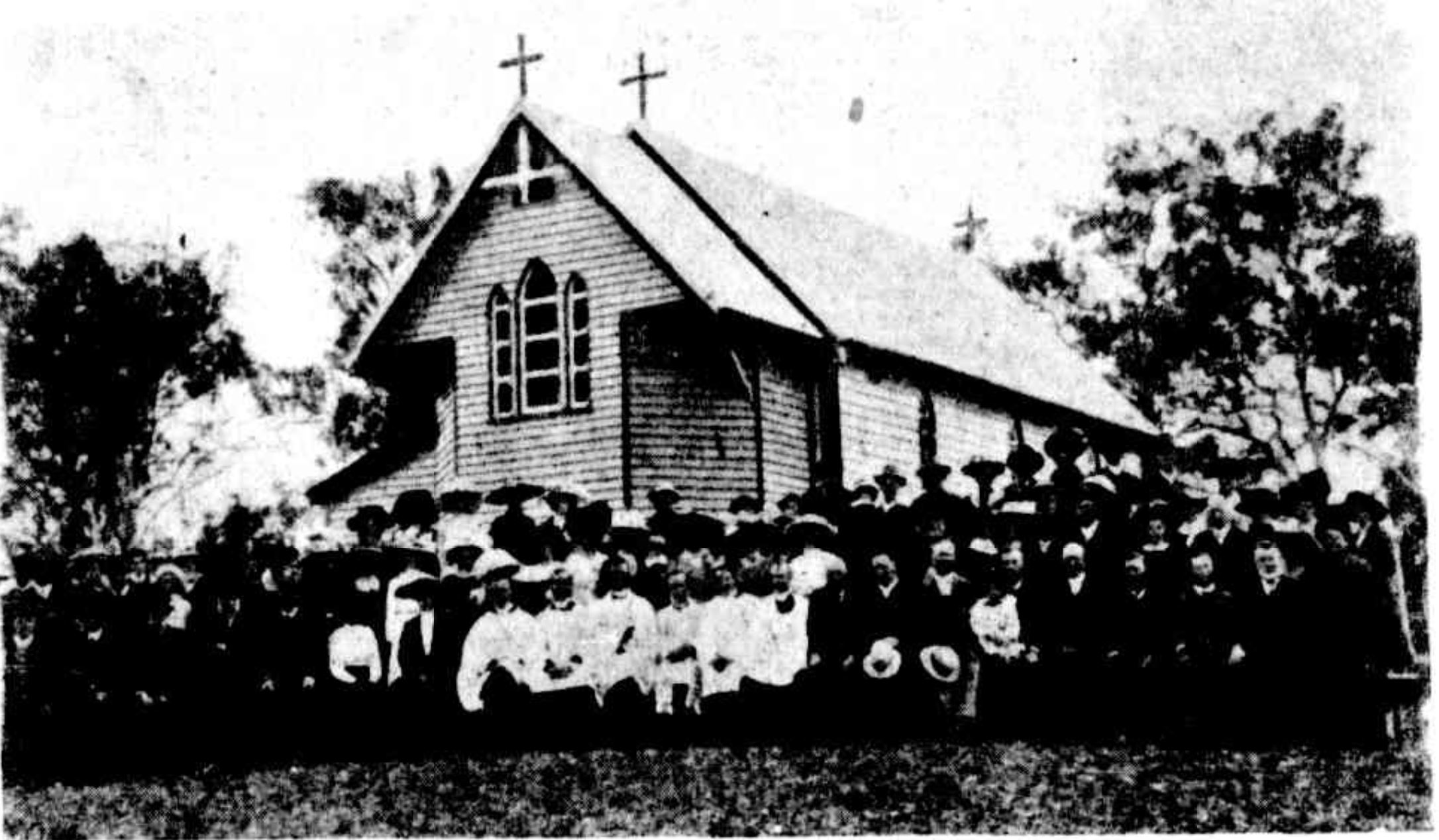
- St James' Anglican Church, 1912

- Interactive map of Pratten
- Coordinates: 28.0878°S 151.7833°E
- Country: Australia
- State: Queensland
- LGA: Southern Downs Region
- Location: 31.4 km (19.5 mi) NW of Warwick; 37.2 km (23.1 mi) SE of Allora; 87.9 km (54.6 mi) S of Toowoomba; 148 km (92 mi) SW of Ipswich; 187 km (116 mi) SW of Brisbane

Government
  - State electorate: Southern Downs
  - Federal division: Maranoa

Area
  - Total: 94.3 km^{2} (36.4 sq mi)

Population
  - Total: 22 (2021 census)
  - Density: 0.233/km^{2} (0.604/sq mi)
- Time zone: UTC+10:00 (AEST)
- Postcode: 4370
Localities around Pratten
Leyburn	Old Talgai	Victoria Hill
Thanes Creek	Pratten	Bony Mountain
Thane	Montrose	Cunningham

Pratten is a rural town and locality in the Southern Downs Region, Queensland, Australia. In the 2021 census, the locality of Pratten had a population of 229 people.

== History ==
The town is named after either the settler Thomas Pratten or his son G.L. Pratten, a surveyor. It was previously known as Darkey Flat, because it was the site of an Aboriginal campsite.

Darkey Flat State School opened in 1876. In 1900, it was renamed Pratten State School. It closed in 1965.

St James' Anglican Church opened on Sunday 31 July 1881 at Darkey Flat.

Pratten Presbyterian Church was officially opened on Monday 21 October 1901 by Reverend Kerr. On Sunday 10 September 1905, the new Patrick Leslie Memorial Presbyterian Church was opened by Reverend Kerr. It commemorates Warwick district pioneer, Patrick Leslie. It was in Elliott Street. Following the cessation of services in Pratten, in September 1954, the church building was relocated to 16 Braemar Street in Warwick. While passing through Cunningham, the church building slipped on the back of the semi-trailer carrying it, overturning the semi-trailer, and blocking the Cunningham Highway for a day.

On 22 October 1909, the Pratten School of Arts at 104 White Street was officially opened by Francis Grayson, the Member of the Queensland Legislative Assembly for Cunningham. It is now a private home.

== Demographics ==
In the 2011 census, the locality of Pratten had a population of 363 people.

In the 2016 census, the locality of Pratten had a population of 205 people.

In the 2021 census, the locality of Pratten had a population of 229 people.

== Education ==
There are no schools in Pratten. The nearest government primary schools are Wheatvale State School in Wheatvale to the south-east and Leyburn State School in Leyburn to the north-west. The nearest government secondary schools are Warwick State High School (to Year 12) in Warwick to the south-east, Allora State School (to Year 10) in Allora to the east, and Clifton State High School (to Year 12) in Clifton to the north-east.

== Amenities ==
The Southern Downs Regional Council operates a mobile library service which visits Pratten Hall in White Street.

St James' Anglican Church is at 42 White Street (on the north-east corner with Hope Street, 28.0917°S 151.7841°E).
