= Thanes Creek, Queensland =

Thanes Creek
- Suburb
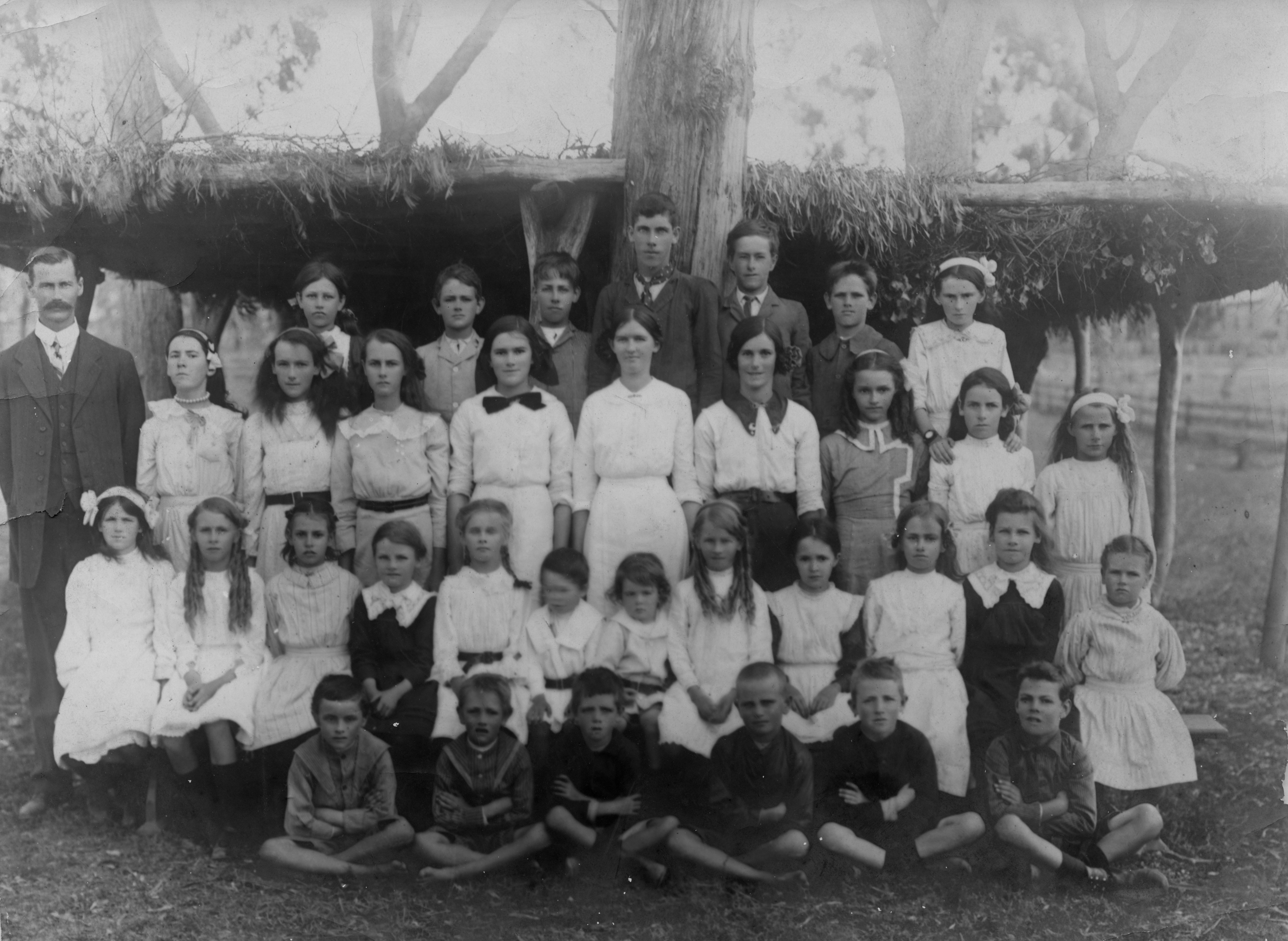
- Thane's Creek State School pupils and teacher

- Interactive map of Thanes Creek
- Coordinates: 28.1183°S 151.6791°E
- Country: Australia
- State: Queensland
- LGA: Southern Downs Region
- Location: 42.6 km (26.5 mi) WNW of Warwick; 83.0 km (51.6 mi) SSW of Toowoomba; 198 km (123 mi) SW of Brisbane

Government
  - State electorate: Southern Downs
  - Federal division: Maranoa

Area
  - Total: 82.6 km^{2} (31.9 sq mi)

Population
  - Total: 61 (2021 census)
  - Density: 0.738/km^{2} (1.913/sq mi)
- Time zone: UTC+10:00 (AEST)
- Postcode: 4370
Suburbs around Thanes Creek
| Leyburn | Pratten | Pratten |
| Karara | Thanes Creek | Pratten |
| Karara | Karara | Thane |

Thanes Creek is a rural locality in the Southern Downs Region, Queensland, Australia. In the 2021 census, Thanes Creek had a population of 61 people.

== Geography ==
The locality is just north of the Cunningham Highway about 40 kilometres (25 miles) west of Warwick.

Mount Gammie (28.1160°S 151.7062°E) is in the east of the locality and rises to 672 metres (2,205 ft) above sea level.

The watercourse Thanes Creek enters to the locality from the south-east (Thane) and meanders north to form part of the boundary of the locality with Leyburn to the north-west, before exiting the locality and forming the boundary between Leyburn and Pratten (to the north).

The land use is predominantly grazing on native vegetation apart from some crop growing in the north of the locality around the watercourse Thanes Creek and its tributary Reedy Creek.

== History ==
The locality was named after the creek, which was in turn named after John Thane, a pioneer pastoralist of the Ellangowan Run, who drowned in the Condamine River in 1844.

Thane's Creek Provisional School opened on 10 October 1892, becoming Thane's Creek State School on 22 January 1900. It closed in 1965. It was on a 5-acre (2.0 ha) site at 15 Bush Cottage Lane (28.10790°S 151.67915°E).

Thanes Creek Presbyterian Church opened on Sunday 20 October 1901. The church closed and the building was removed in 1997. It was on the western side of Bush Lane (28.1079°S 151.6770°E).

== Demographics ==
In the 2016 census, Thanes Creek had a population of 30 people.

In the 2021 census, Thanes Creek had a population of 61 people.

== Education ==
There are no schools in Thanes Creek. The nearest government primary schools are Leyburn State School in neighbouring Leyburn to the north-west, Karara State School in neighbouring Karara to the south-west, and Wheatvale State School in Wheatvale to the east. The nearest government secondary schools are Warwick State High School (to Year 12) in Warwick to the south-east, Allora State School (to Year 10) in Allora to the east, and Clifton State High School in Clifton to the north-east.

== Attractions ==
Thanes Creek is a former gold mining area, and the site of a government approved gold fossicking area.
