= Terrica, Queensland =

Terrica
- Suburb
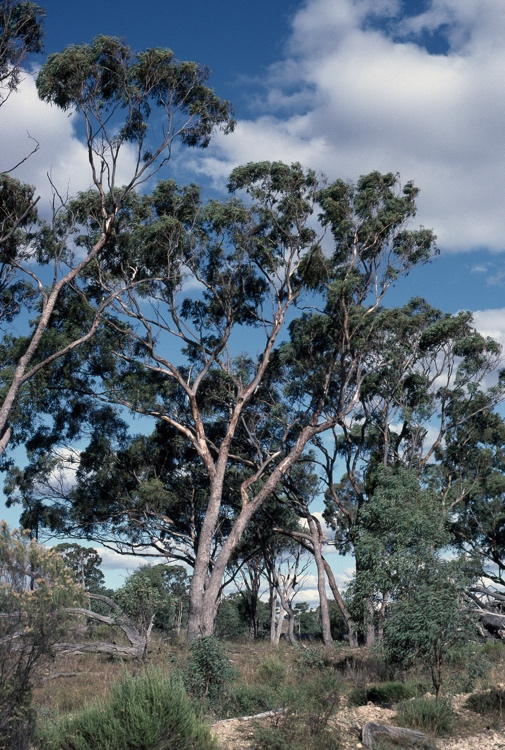
- Eucalyptus terrica, 2019

- Interactive map of Terrica
- Coordinates: 28.5027°S 151.4808°E
- Country: Australia
- State: Queensland
- LGA: Goondiwindi Region
- Location: 55.5 km (34.5 mi) ESE of Inglewood; 56.1 km (34.9 mi) NW of Stanthorpe; 92.9 km (57.7 mi) SW of Warwick; 147 km (91 mi) E of Goondiwindi; 264 km (164 mi) SW of Brisbane
- Established: 1877

Government
  - State electorate: Southern Downs
  - Federal division: Maranoa

Area
  - Total: 385.0 km^{2} (148.6 sq mi)

Population
  - Total: 29 (2021 census)
  - Density: 0.0753/km^{2} (0.195/sq mi)
- Time zone: UTC+10:00 (AEST)
- Postcode: 4387
Suburbs around Terrica
Oman Ama	Gore	Cement Mills
Oman Ama	Terrica	Goldfields
Warroo	Warroo	Pikedale

Terrica is a rural locality in the Goondiwindi Region, Queensland, Australia. In the 2021 census, Terrica had a population of 29 people.

== Geography ==
The Stanthorpe Inglewood Road enters the locality from the south-east (Pikedale) and exits the locality to the south-west (Warroo).

Terrica has the following mountains:

- Castle Hill (28.3957°S 151.4275°E) 540 metres (1,770 ft)
- Tank Mountain (28.4643°S 151.4233°E) 559 metres (1,834 ft)

The Macintyre State Forest is in the east of the locality. Apart from this protected area, the land use is grazing on native vegetation.

== History ==
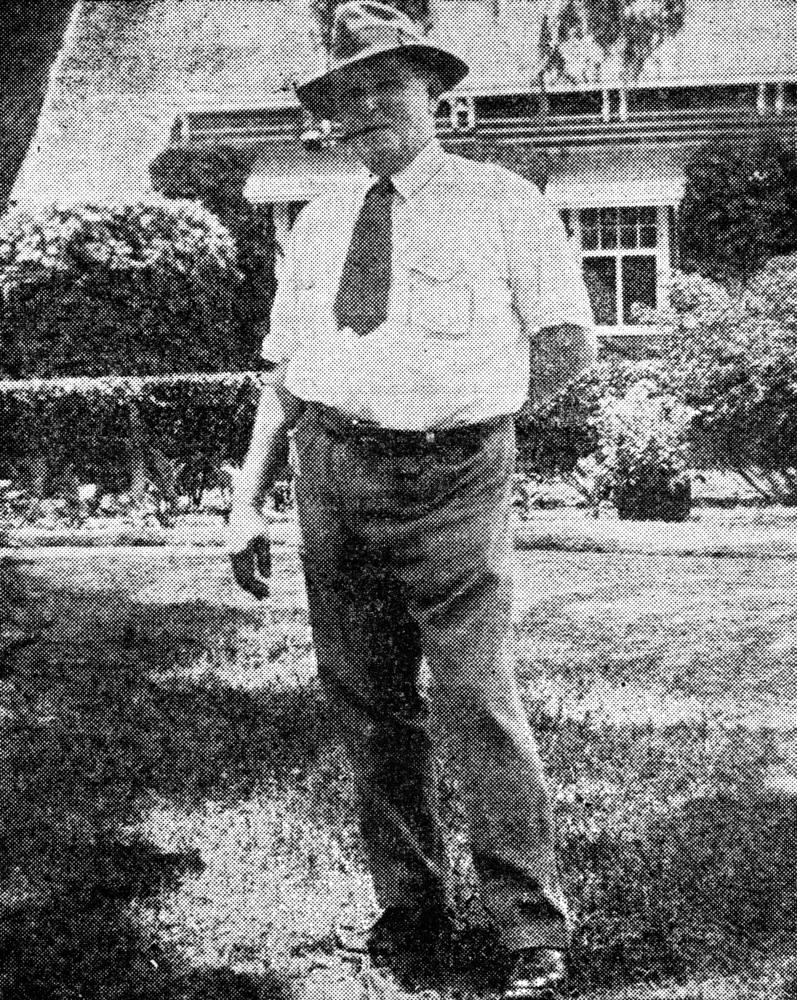
Scott McLeod, owner of Terrica pastoral station, 1934

The locality takes its name from the Terrica parish name, which in turn takes its name from early pastoral run spelt variously in the New South Wales Government Gazette as Terica, Terrea, Terren or Terrin. The pastoral run was held by Adolphus Trevethan in 1847 and transferred to Captain John Pike in 1852.

Terrica was opened for selection on 17 April 1877; 31 square miles (80 km^{2}) were available.

== Demographics ==
In the 2016 census, Terrica had a population of 17 people.

In the 2021 census, Terrica had a population of 29 people.

== Education ==
There are no schools in Terrica. The nearest government primary schools are Karara State School in Karara to the north, Greenlands State School in Greenlands to the south-east, and Inglewood State School in Inglewood to the north-west. The nearest government secondary schools are Inglewood State School (to Year 10) and Stanthorpe State High School (to Year 12) in Stanthorpe to the south-east. Some parts of Terrica may be too distant to attend these secondary schools; the alternatives are distance education and boarding school.

There are also a Catholic primary school in Inglewood and a Catholic primary-and-secondary school in Stanthorpe.

== Flora ==
The Eucalyptus terrica species of tree takes its name from the Terrica pastoral run.
