= Bony Mountain, Queensland =

Bony Mountain
- Suburb
- Interactive map of Bony Mountain
- Coordinates: 28.1005°S 151.8425°E
- Country: Australia
- State: Queensland
- LGA: Southern Downs Region
- Location: 26.3 km (16.3 mi) NW of Warwick; 34.0 km (21.1 mi) SW of Clifton; 81.2 km (50.5 mi) S of Toowoomba; 174 km (108 mi) SW of Brisbane

Government
  - State electorate: Southern Downs
  - Federal division: Maranoa

Area
  - Total: 67.5 km^{2} (26.1 sq mi)

Population
  - Total: 91 (2021 census)
  - Density: 1.348/km^{2} (3.492/sq mi)
- Time zone: UTC+10:00 (AEST)
- Postcode: 4370
Suburbs around Bony Mountain
Old Talgai	Victoria Hill	Talgai
Pratten	Bony Mountain	Deuchar
Cunningham	Wheatvale; Upper Wheatvale	Massie

Bony Mountain is a rural locality in the Southern Downs Region, Queensland, Australia. In the 2021 census, Bony Mountain had a population of 91 people.

== History ==
The locality was named after mountain which was named after bones of horses found in the vicinity, possibly from runaways from Toolburra station or from horses that died from the drought in 1900.

Bony Mountain Provisional School opened on 18 February 1902. On 1 January 1909, it became Bony Mountain State School. It closed on 30 March 1972. It was in the northern part of 20 Bony Mountain Road (28.1310°S 151.8340°E).

== Demographics ==
In the 2016 census, Bony Mountain had a population of 94 people.

In the 2021 census, Bony Mountain had a population of 91 people.

== Education ==
There are no schools in Bony Mountain. The nearest government primary schools are Wheatvale State School in neighbouring Wheatvale to the south and Allora State School in Allora to the north-east. The nearest government secondary schools are Clifton State High School (to Year 12) in Clifton to the north, Allora State School (to Year 10) in Allora to the north-east, and Warwick State High School (to Year 12) in Warwick to the south-east.
