= Cunningham, Queensland =

Cunningham
- Suburb
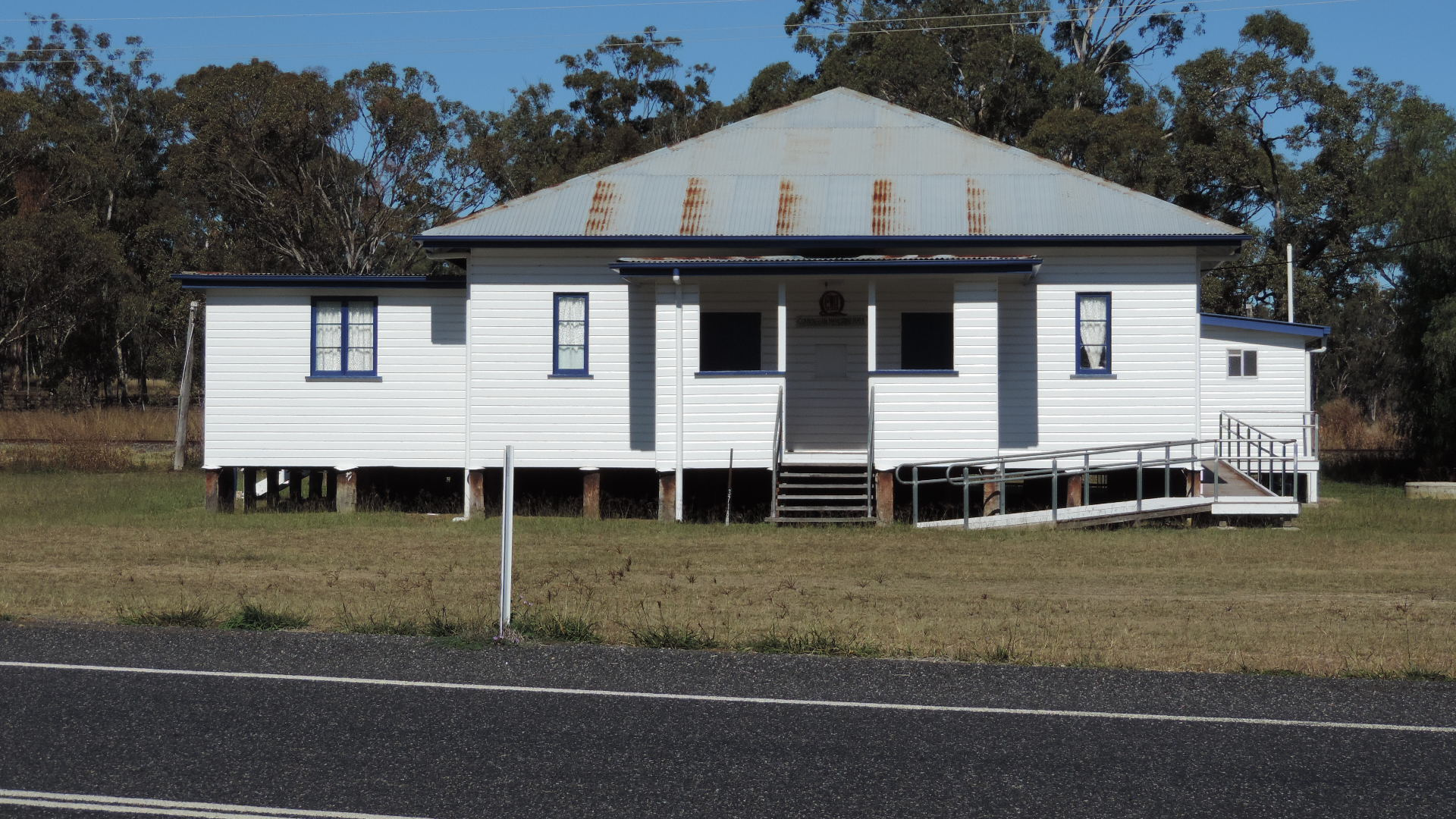
- Country Women's Association Memorial Hall, Cunningham, 2015

- Interactive map of Cunningham
- Coordinates: 28.1666°S 151.8191°E
- Country: Australia
- State: Queensland
- LGA: Southern Downs Region
- Location: 23.7 km (14.7 mi) WNW of Warwick; 84.4 km (52.4 mi) SSW of Toowoomba; 137 km (85 mi) SW of Ipswich; 178 km (111 mi) SW of Brisbane

Government
  - State electorate: Southern Downs
  - Federal division: Maranoa

Area
  - Total: 17.6 km^{2} (6.8 sq mi)

Population
  - Total: 58 (2021 census)
  - Density: 3.30/km^{2} (8.54/sq mi)
- Time zone: UTC+10:00 (AEST)
- Postcode: 4370
Suburbs around Cunningham
Pratten	Upper Wheatvale	Wheatvale
Montrose	Cunningham	Wheatvale
Greymare	Rodgers Creek	Rodgers Creek

Cunningham is a rural locality in the Southern Downs Region, Queensland, Australia. In the 2021 census, Cunningham had a population of 58 people.

== Geography ==
The Condamine River forms the north-eastern boundary of the locality.

The Cunningham Highway enters the locality from the east (Wheatvale) and forms part of the southern boundary, before exiting to the south-west (Greymare / Montrose). The South Western railway line passes through the locality from the north-east (Wheatvale) and exits to the south-west (Montrose) with the locality served by the Cunningham railway station in the north-east of the locality (28.1596°S 151.8381°E).

There is a small urban centre on the Leyburn-Cunningham Road which features the Country Women's Association Memorial Hall at Cunningham Road, a memorial park and the railway station.

The land use is predominantly grazing on native vegetation in the south of the locality with crop growing and horticulture in the north of the locality along the Condamine River.

== History ==
The locality is named after explorer and botanist Allan Cunningham who was the first European to see the lush pastures of the Darling Downs in 1827.

== Demographics ==
In the 2016 census, Cunningham had a population of 66 people.

In the 2021 census, Cunningham had a population of 58 people.

== Education ==
There are no schools in Cunningham. The nearest government primary school is Wheatvale State School in neighbouring Wheatvale to the east. The nearest government secondary school is Warwick State High School in Warwick to the east.

== Amenities ==
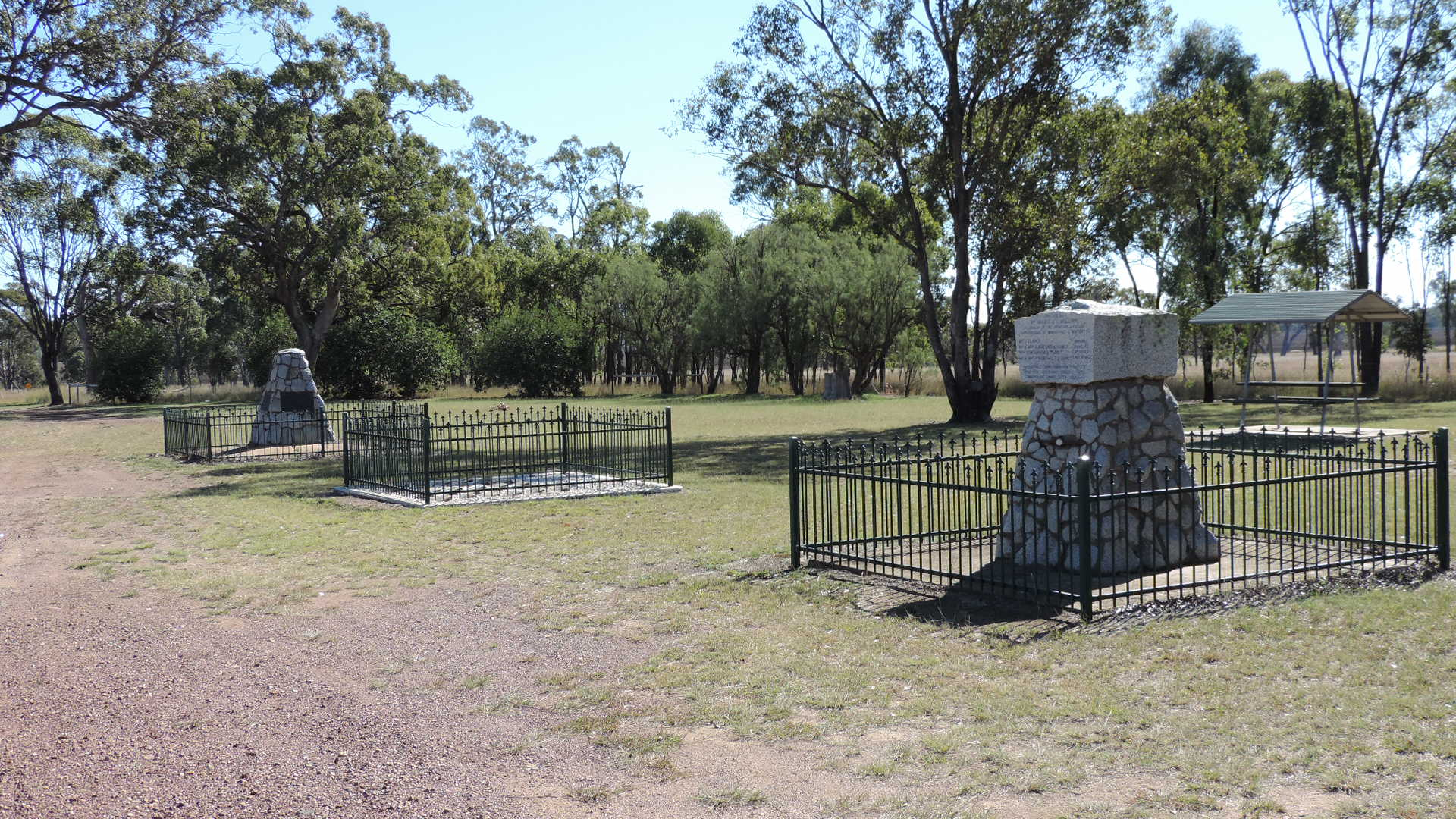
Memorial park, 2015

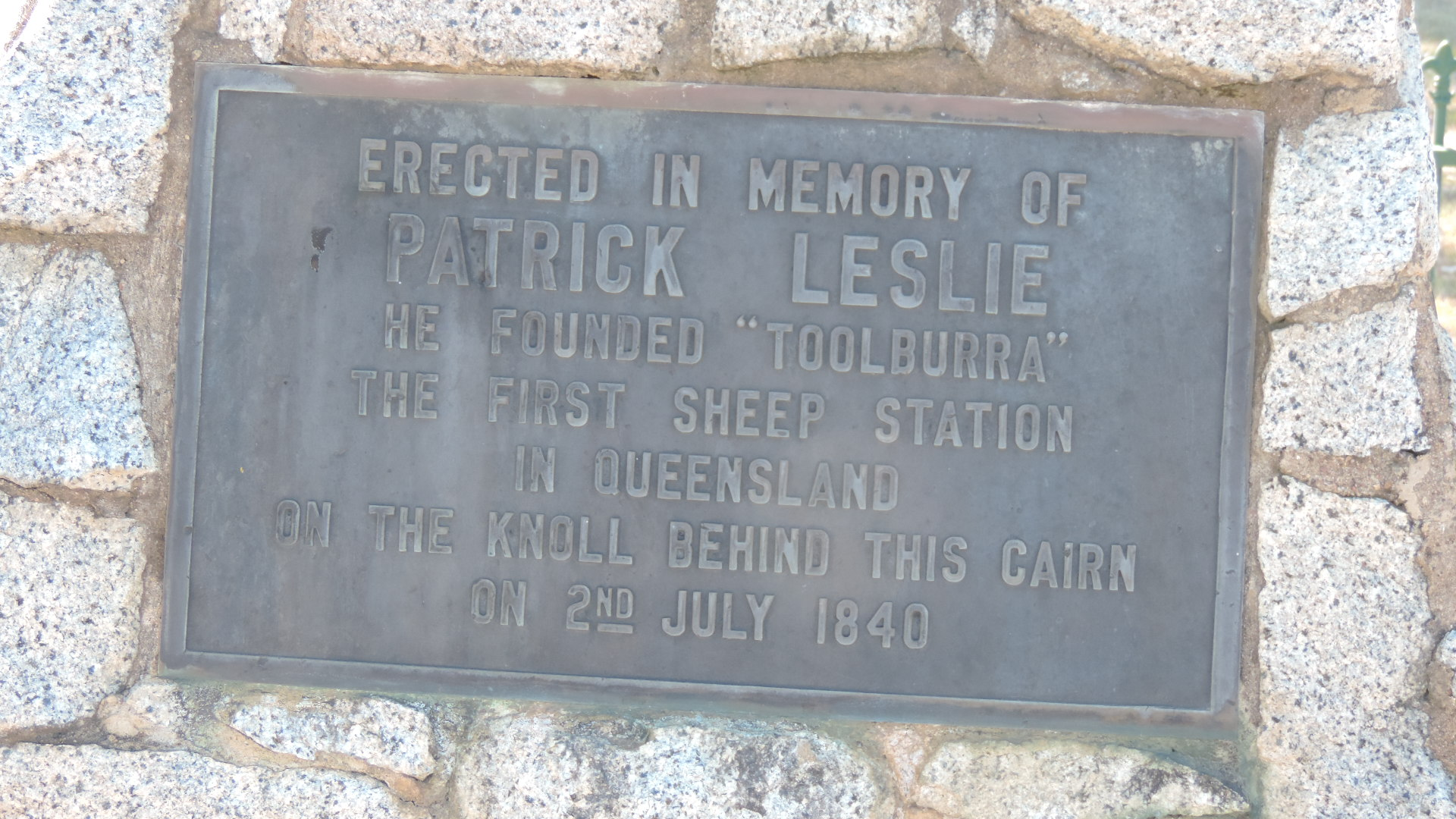
Memorial to Patrick Leslie, Cunningham, 2015

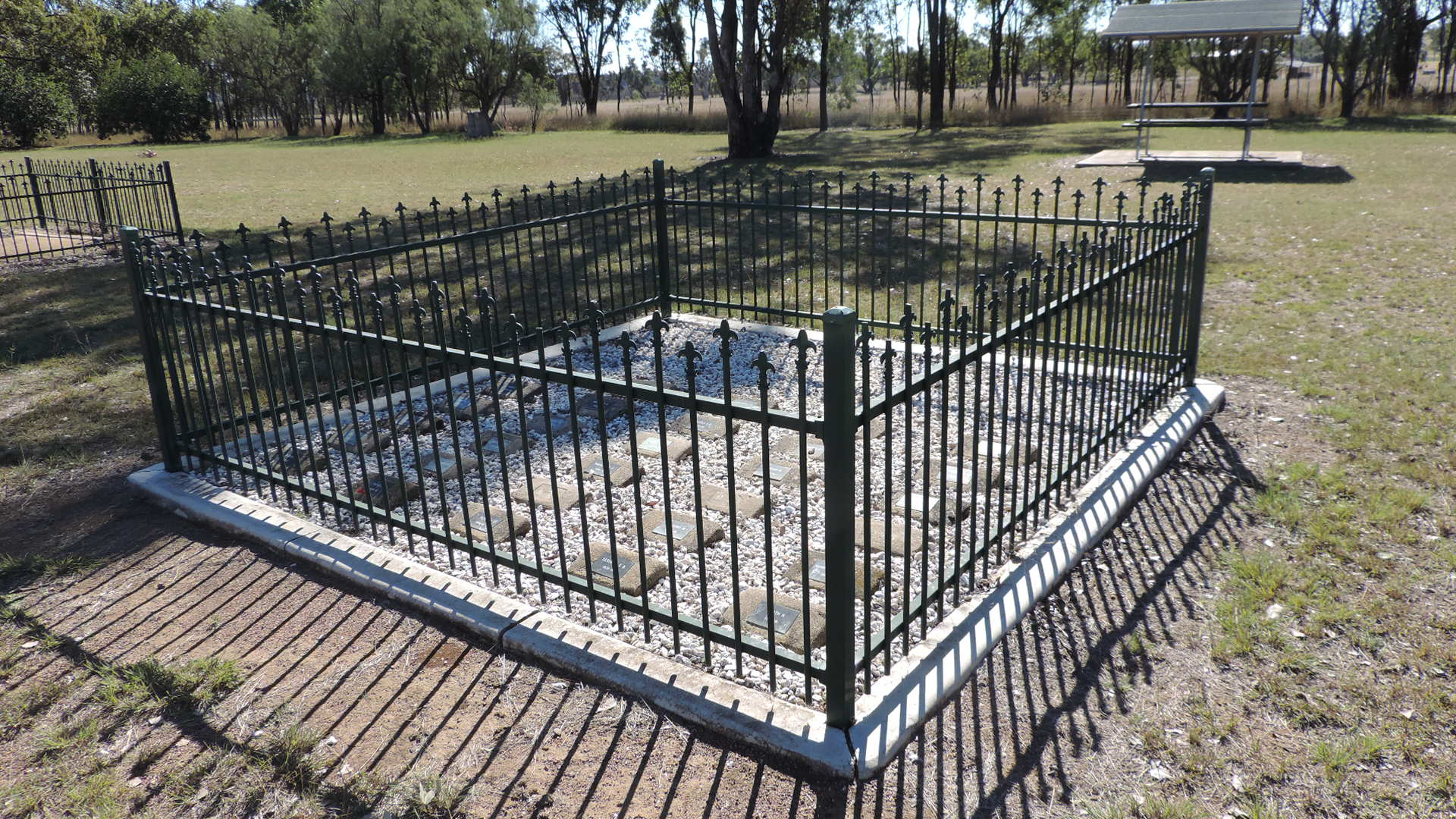
War memorial, Cunningham, 2015

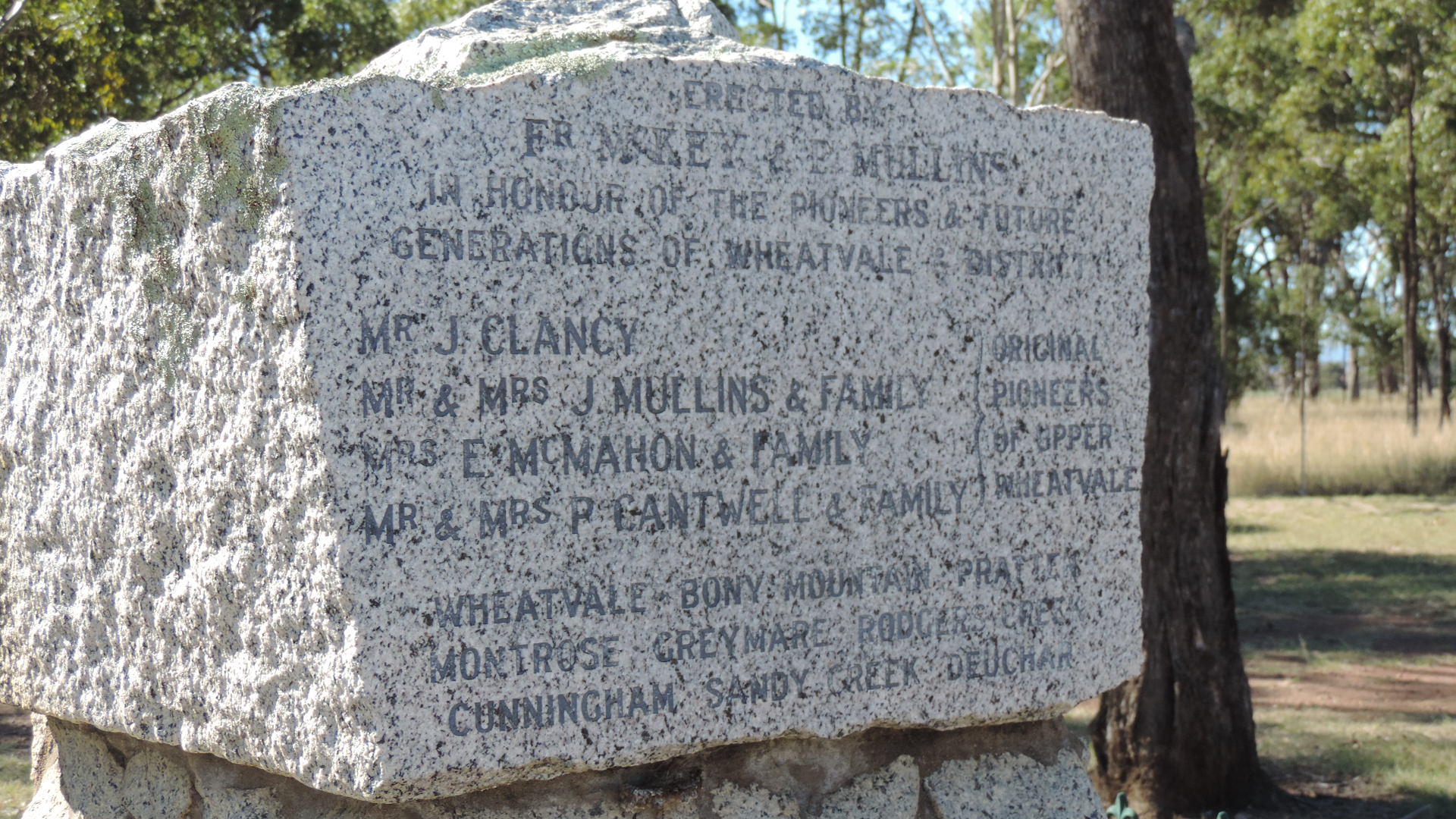
Monument to local pioneering families, 2015

The memorial park has a picnic table as well as three memorials to (left to right):

- Patrick Leslie, the first settler on the Darling Downs who founded Toolburra Station north of the park
- the local servicemen who died in World War I and World War II
- the pioneer families of the district: Clancy, Mullins, McMahon and Cantwell

The memorial cairn to Patrick Leslie was erected by the Rosenthal Shire Council and unveiled on 10 December 1959 by the Shire Chairman, J. A. Costello.

The Cunningham branch of the Queensland Country Women's Association meets at the QCWA Hall on Cunningham Road.
