= Thane, Queensland =

Thane
- Town
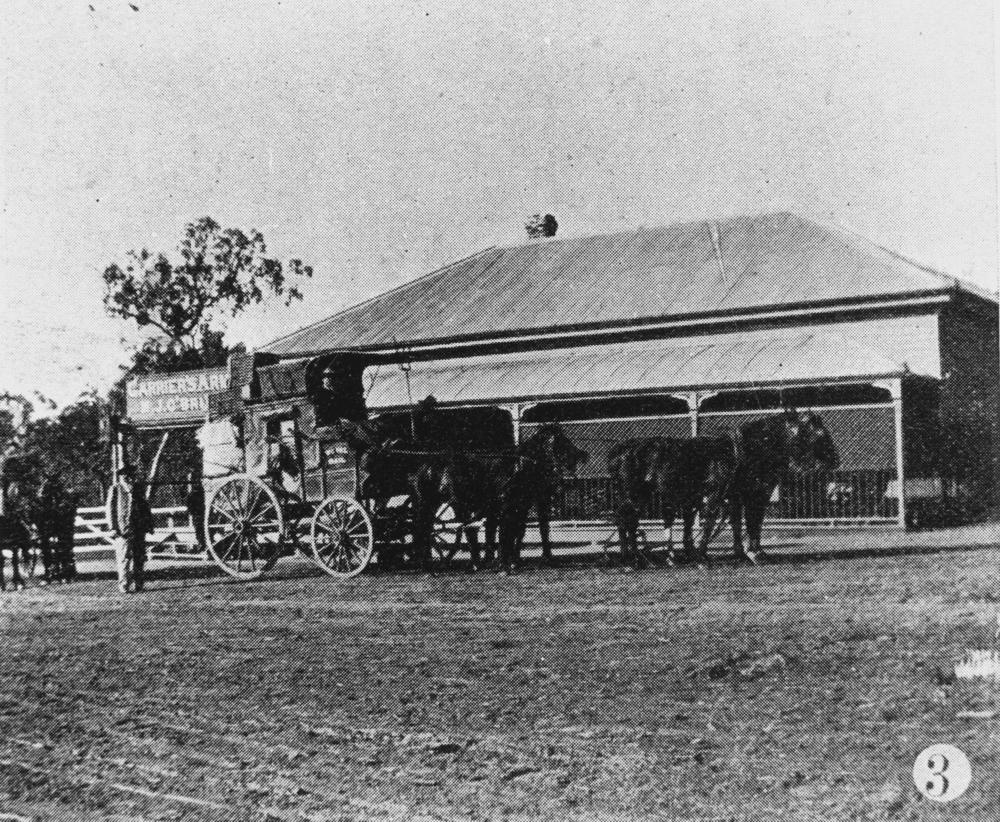
- Carriers Arms Hotel at Thane, 1907

- Interactive map of Thane
- Coordinates: 28.1613°S 151.6975°E
- Country: Australia
- State: Queensland
- LGA: Southern Downs Region
- Location: 39.5 km (24.5 mi) W of Warwick; 97.6 km (60.6 mi) SSW of Toowoomba; 153 km (95 mi) SW of Ipswich; 193 km (120 mi) SW of Brisbane

Government
  - State electorate: Southern Downs
  - Federal division: Maranoa

Area
  - Total: 38.1 km^{2} (14.7 sq mi)

Population
  - Total: 19 (2021 census)
  - Density: 0.499/km^{2} (1.29/sq mi)
- Time zone: UTC+10:00 (AEST)
- Postcode: 4370
Localities around Thane
Thanes Creek	Thanes Creek	Pratten
Thanes Creek	Thane	Montrose
Karara	Greymare	Greymare

Thane is a rural town and locality in the Southern Downs Region, Queensland, Australia. In the 2021 census, the locality of Thane had a population of 19 people.

== Geography ==
The Cunningham Highway traverses the locality from the south-east (Greymare) to south-west (Karara) passing through the town of Thane which is roughly central within the locality. The South Western railway line also traverses through the locality slightly to the north of the highway from Greymare to the town of Thane and then goes further north than the highway towards Karara before it exits slightly to the north of the highway. The town is served by the Thane railway station (28.1617°S 151.7019°E).

Thanes Creek (the watercourse) enters the locality from the south-west (Karara) and exits to the north-west (the locality of Thanes Creek).

The predominant land use is grazing on native vegetation. There is some crop growing along Thanes Creek (the watercourse) to the north of the town.

== History ==
The town takes its name from the railway station named on 5 February 1904 after John Thane, a pioneer pastoralist of Ellangowan Run, who drowned in the Condamine River in about 1843.

Thane Provisional School opened on 27 March 1905. On 1 January 1909 it became Thane State School. It closed on 2 May 1925. It was located between Thanes Creek Road and the Cunningham Highway (28.1608°S 151.6954°E).

On 27 July 1905 the Queensland Government offered 22 town lots near the Thane railway station, then the terminus of the South Western railway line, ranging in size from 1 to 4 roods (1,000 to 4,000 m^{2}). However, there were only five buyers.

St John's Anglican Church opened circa 1909 and closed circa 1968. It was at 230 Thanes Creek Road (28.1598°S 151.6967°E). The church was relocated to the Mile End Park, 177 Pratten Street in west Warwick.

On 26 September 1911 the Queensland Government tried to sell more of the town lots.

== Demographics ==
In the 2016 census, the locality of Thane had a population of 27 people.

In the 2021 census, the locality of Thane had a population of 19 people.

== Education ==
There are no schools in Thane. The nearest government primary schools are Karara State School in neighbouring Karara to the south-west and Wheatvale State School in Wheatvale to the east. The nearest government secondary schools are Allora State School (to Year 10 only) to Allora to the north-east and Warwick State High School (to Year 12) in Warwick to the south-east.
