= Rodgers Creek, Queensland =

Rodgers Creek
- Suburb
- Interactive map of Rodgers Creek
- Coordinates: 28.2252°S 151.8338°E
- Country: Australia
- State: Queensland
- LGA: Southern Downs Region
- Location: 28.0 km (17.4 mi) W of Warwick; 91.2 km (56.7 mi) S of Toowoomba; 186 km (116 mi) SW of Brisbane

Government
  - State electorate: Southern Downs
  - Federal division: Maranoa

Area
  - Total: 63.6 km^{2} (24.6 sq mi)

Population
  - Total: 15 (2021 census)
  - Density: 0.236/km^{2} (0.611/sq mi)
- Time zone: UTC+10:00 (AEST)
- Postcode: 4370
Suburbs around Rodgers Creek
Montrose	Cunningham	Wheatvale
Greymare	Rodgers Creek	Leslie Dam
Greymare	Palgrave	Leslie Dam

Rodgers Creek is a rural locality in the Southern Downs Region, Queensland, Australia. In the 2021 census, Rodgers Creek had a population of 15 people.

== Geography ==
The Cunningham Highway forms a short part of the locality's north-western boundary, entering from the north (Cunningham) and exiting to the north-west (Greymare / Montrose). The South Western railway line touches along the north-western boundary of the locality; there are no railway stations serving the locality.

The watercourse Rodger Creek rises in the south of the locality and flows north through the locality, exiting to the north (Cunningham).

The land use is predominantly grazing on native vegetation with some crop growing around Rodger Creek.

== History ==
The origin of the name is unclear. One story is that it is named after stockman James "Cocky" Rogers; another is that it is named after a boundary rider called Rodgers.

== Demographics ==
In the 2016 census, Rodgers Creek had a population of 7 people.

In the 2021 census, Rodgers Creek had a population of 15 people.

== Education ==
There are no schools in Rodgers Creek. The nearest government primary schools are Wheatvale State School in neighbouring Wheatvale to the north-east and Warwick West State School in Warwick to the east. The nearest government secondary school is Warwick State High School, also in Warwick. There are also non-government schools in Warwick.
