= Montrose, Queensland =

Montrose, Queensland may refer:

- Montrose, Queensland (Southern Downs Region)
- Montrose, Queensland (Western Downs Region)
