= Montrose, Queensland (Southern Downs Region) =

Montrose
- Suburb
- Interactive map of Montrose
- Coordinates: 28.1602°S 151.7775°E
- Country: Australia
- State: Queensland
- LGA: Southern Downs Region
- Location: 29.5 km (18.3 mi) WNW of Warwick; 91.7 km (57.0 mi) SSW of Toowoomba; 148 km (92 mi) SW of Ipswich; 189 km (117 mi) SW of Brisbane

Government
  - State electorate: Southern Downs
  - Federal division: Maranoa

Area
  - Total: 13.8 km^{2} (5.3 sq mi)

Population
  - Total: 0 (2021 census)
  - Density: 0.00/km^{2} (0.00/sq mi)
- Time zone: UTC+10:00 (AEST)
- Postcode: 4370
Suburbs around Montrose
Thane	Pratten	Pratten
Thane	Montrose	Cunningham
Greymare	Greymare	Rodgers Creek

Montrose is a rural locality in the Southern Downs Region, Queensland, Australia. In the 2021 census, Montrose had "no people or a very low population".

== Geography ==
The locality is bounded to the south by the Cunningham Highway, which enters the locality from the south-east (Cunningham / Rodgers Creek) and exits to the south-west (Greymare).

The South Western railway line runs to the north and loosely parallel with the highway, entering the locality from the east (Cunningham) and exiting to the west (Greymare). The locality was historically served by the now-abandoned Montrose railway station (28.1810°S 151.7929°E).

The land use is grazing on native vegetation.

== History ==
The locality takes its name from the railway station, which, in turn, came from a pastoral run, named by pastoralist St George Richard Gore after the town of Montrose in Forfarshire, Scotland.

== Demographics ==
In the 2016 census, Montrose had "no people or a very low population".

In the 2021 census, Montrose had "no people or a very low population".

== Education ==
There are no schools in Montrose. The nearest government primary school is Wheatvale State School in Wheatvale to the east. The nearest government secondary school is Warwick State High School in Warwick to the east.
