= Cement Mills, Queensland =

Cement Mills
- Suburb
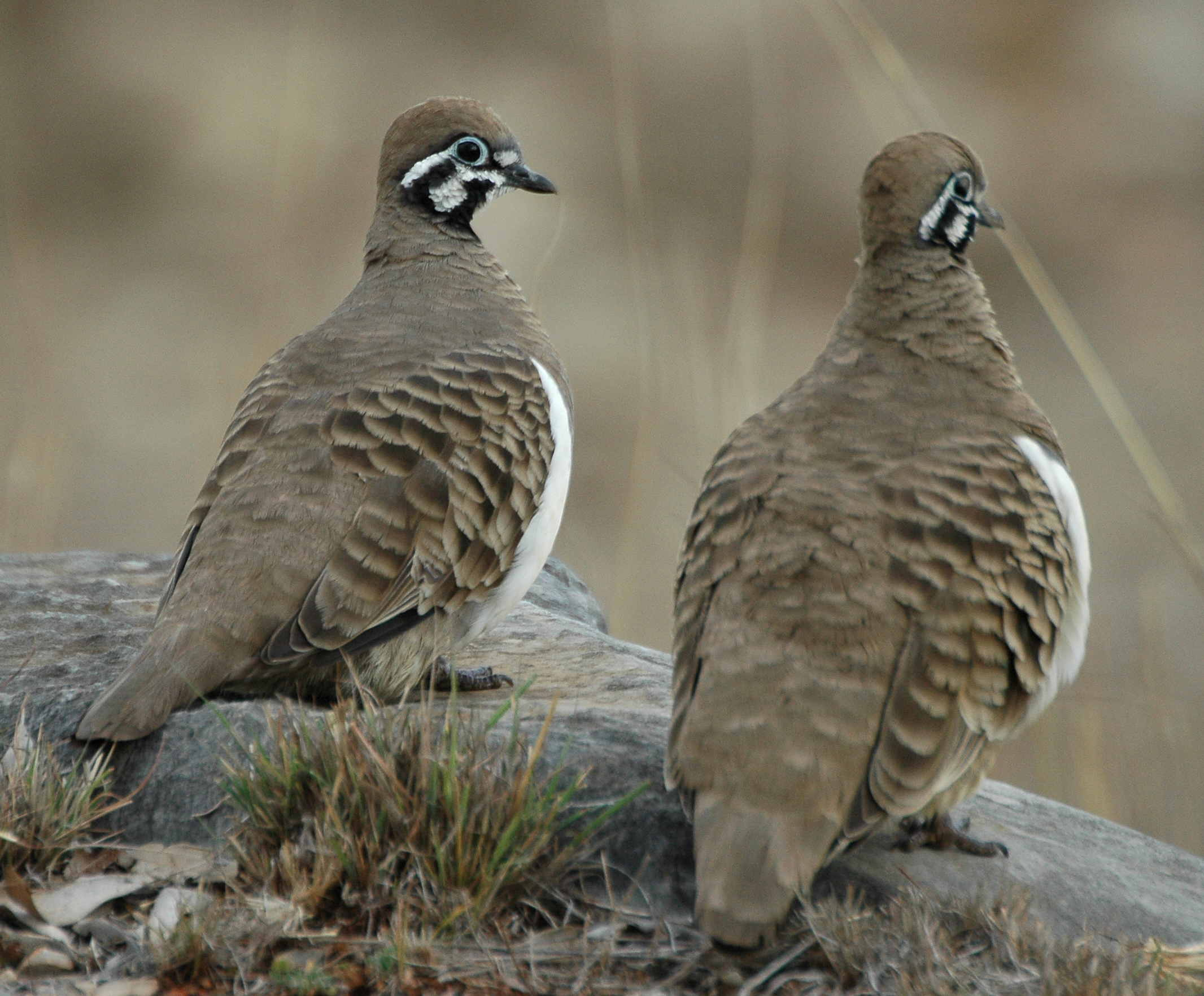
- Squatter pigeons at Cement Mills, 2006

- Interactive map of Cement Mills
- Coordinates: 28.3788°S 151.5747°E
- Country: Australia
- State: Queensland
- LGA: Goondiwindi Region
- Location: 50.9 km (31.6 mi) ENE of Inglewood; 80.1 km (49.8 mi) NW of Stanthorpe; 109 km (68 mi) SW of Toowoomba; 142 km (88 mi) E of Goondiwindi; 227 km (141 mi) SW of Brisbane

Government
  - State electorate: Southern Downs
  - Federal division: Maranoa

Area
  - Total: 402.2 km^{2} (155.3 sq mi)

Population
  - Total: 11 (2021 census)
  - Density: 0.0273/km^{2} (0.071/sq mi)
- Time zone: UTC+10:00 (AEST)
- Postcode: 4352
Suburbs around Cement Mills
Gore	Karara	Greymare
Gore	Cement Mills	Palgrave
Terrica	Terrica	Goldfields

Cement Mills is a rural locality in the Goondiwindi Region, Queensland, Australia. In the 2021 census, Cement Mills had a population of 11 people.

== History ==
From 1916, Queensland Cement and Lime Company, based in Brisbane, obtained its limestone from the Gore area on the Darling Downs. A mail receiving office called Cementmills was opened at the company's works in about January 1918, being renamed to Cement Mills in March 1918. It was upgraded to a full post office on 20 April 1925. By 1937, the company ceased using limestone from the area in favour of the coral from Moreton Bay, resulting in the closure of the quarries and the cement mill.

Gore State School opened on 20 January 1913. It was renamed Maxhill State School in 1927. In 1937, the school building was relocated to the cement mills and renamed Cement Mills State School. The school closed on 21 February 1975. In the 1980s, at the request of residents, the Inglewood Shire Council bought the school building and relocated it for use it as a public hall. Its current location is on Cement Mills Road (28.3417°S 151.5051°E).

== Demographics ==
In the 2016 census, Cement Mills had a population of 13 people.

In the 2021 census, Cement Mills had a population of 11 people.

== Education ==
There are no schools in Cement Mills. The nearest government primary schools are Karara State School in neighbouring Karara to the north and Amiens State School in Amiens to the south-east. The nearest government secondary schools are Inglewood State School (to Year 10) in Inglewood to the west and Stanthorpe State High School (to Year 12) in Stanthorpe to the south-east. However, parts of Cement Mills are too distant to attend these secondary schools; the alternatives are distance education and boarding school.

There are also non-government schools in Inglewood and Stanthorpe.
