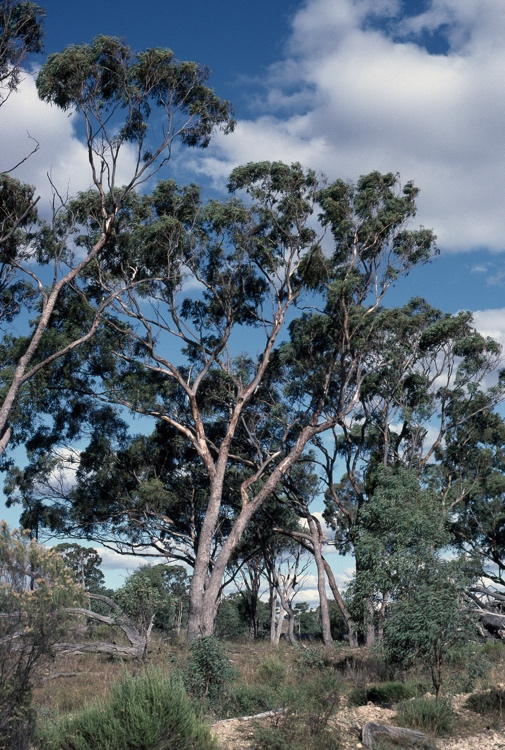

Scientific classification
- Kingdom: Plantae
- Clade: Tracheophytes
- Clade: Angiosperms
- Clade: Eudicots
- Clade: Rosids
- Order: Myrtales
- Family: Myrtaceae
- Genus: Eucalyptus
- Species: E. terrica

Binomial name
- Eucalyptus terrica A.R.Bean

= Eucalyptus terrica =

Species of eucalyptus

Eucalyptus terrica is a species of small tree that is endemic to south-eastern Queensland. It has thin, rough, fibrous bark on the trunk and larger branches, smooth bark above, lance-shaped adult leaves, flower buds in groups of seven, white flowers and hemispherical fruit.

== Description ==
Eucalyptus terrica is a tree that typically grows to a height of 8–10 mm (0.31–0.39 in) and forms a lignotuber. It has thin, rough, fibrous bark on the trunk, sometimes also on the larger branches, smooth grey to brown bark above. Young plants and coppice regrowth have dull greyish, narrow lance-shaped leaves that are arranged alternately, 60–140 mm (2.4–5.5 in) long and 10–25 mm (0.39–0.98 in) wide. Adult leaves are the same shade of dull green to greyish on both sides, narrow lance-shaped to lance-shaped, 75–130 mm (3.0–5.1 in) long and 9–17 mm (0.35–0.67 in) wide, tapering to a petiole 7–20 mm (0.28–0.79 in) long. The flower buds are arranged in leaf axils in groups of seven on an unbranched peduncle 3–12 mm (0.12–0.47 in) long, the individual buds on pedicels 1–3 mm (0.039–0.118 in) long. Mature buds are oval, creamy yellow, 6–8 mm (0.24–0.31 in) long and 3–4 mm (0.12–0.16 in) wide with a conical to horn-shaped operculum that is longer than the floral cup. Flowering occurs from September to October and the flowers are white. The fruit is a woody, hemispherical capsule 2–4 mm (0.079–0.157 in) long and 4–6 mm (0.16–0.24 in) wide with the valves prominently protruding.

== Taxonomy and naming ==
Eucalyptus terrica was first formally described in 1991 by Anthony Bean in the journal Austrobaileya from specimens collected near Gore in 1990. The specific epithet (terrica) is from the name of the station (Terrica Station) where the type material was collected.

== Distribution and habit ==
This tree grows with other eucalypts in hilly country between Warwick and Inglewood in south-east Queensland.

== Conservation status ==
This eucalypt is classified as "least concern" under the Queensland Government Nature Conservation Act 1992.

== See also ==
- List of Eucalyptus species
