= Upper Wheatvale, Queensland =

Upper Wheatvale
- Suburb
- Interactive map of Upper Wheatvale
- Coordinates: 28.14°S 151.8744°E
- Country: Australia
- State: Queensland
- LGA: Southern Downs Region
- Location: 18.4 km (11.4 mi) SW of Allora; 22.3 km (13.9 mi) NW of Warwick; 84.8 km (52.7 mi) S of Toowoomba; 169 km (105 mi) SW of Brisbane

Government
  - State electorate: Southern Downs
  - Federal division: Maranoa

Area
  - Total: 9.3 km^{2} (3.6 sq mi)
- Elevation: 431–537 m (1,414–1,762 ft)

Population
  - Total: 45 (2021 census)
  - Density: 4.84/km^{2} (12.53/sq mi)
- Time zone: UTC+10:00 (AEST)
- Postcode: 4370
Suburbs around Upper Wheatvale
Bony Mountain	Bony Mountain	Massie
Bony Mountain	Upper Wheatvale	Massie
Wheatvale	Wheatvale	Wheatvale

Upper Wheatvale is a rural locality in the Southern Downs Region, Queensland, Australia. In the 2021 census, Upper Wheatvale had a population of 45 people.

== Geographics ==
The Condamine River forms the south-eastern boundary of the locality.

The land is relatively flat and predominantly used for growing crops with some grazing on native vegetation.

== Demographics ==
In the 2016 census, Upper Wheatvale had a population of 51 people.

In the 2021 census, Upper Wheatvale had a population of 45 people.

== Education ==
There are no schools in Upper Wheatvale. The nearest government primary school is Wheatvale State School in neighbouring Wheatvale to the south. The nearest government secondary schools are Allora State School (to Year 10) in Allora to the north-east and Warwick State High School (to Year 12) in Warwick to the south-east.
