= Greymare, Queensland =

Greymare
- Suburb
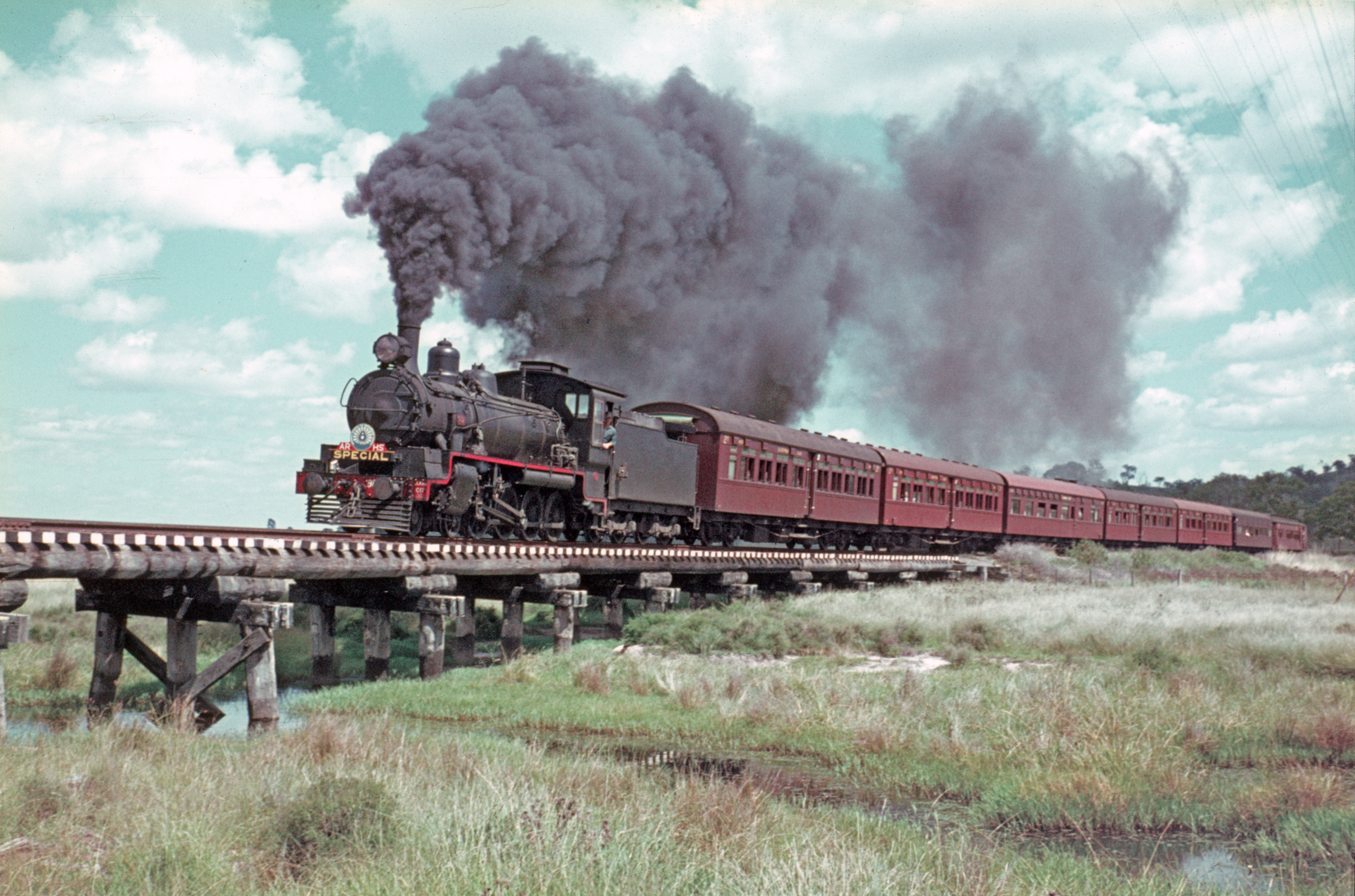
- C17 locomotive near Greymare, 1967

- Interactive map of Greymare
- Coordinates: 28.2636°S 151.7219°E
- Country: Australia
- State: Queensland
- LGA: Southern Downs Region
- Location: 36.4 km (22.6 mi) W of Warwick; 99.5 km (61.8 mi) SSW of Toowoomba; 191 km (119 mi) SW of Brisbane

Government
  - State electorate: Southern Downs
  - Federal division: Maranoa

Area
  - Total: 189.1 km^{2} (73.0 sq mi)

Population
  - Total: 70 (2021 census)
  - Density: 0.370/km^{2} (0.96/sq mi)
- Time zone: UTC+10:00 (AEST)
- Postcode: 4370
Suburbs around Greymare
| Karara | Thane | Montrose |
| Karara | Greymare | Rodgers Creek |
| Cement Mills | Cement Mills | Palgrave |

Greymare is a rural locality in the Southern Downs Region, Queensland, Australia. In the 2021 census, Greymare had a population of 70 people.

== Geography ==
The Cunningham Highway enters the locality from the north-east (Montrose / Rodgers Creek) and exits to the north (Thane).

The South-Western railway line enters the locality from the north-east (Montrose) and exits to the north (Thane). Greymare railway station served the locality but is now abandoned (28.1714°S 151.7667°E).

== History ==
The locality was named after a grey mare which belonged to pastoralist John Deuchar. This horse would escape from any paddock and head for the Greymare Creek. The Greymare railway station was named in 1904.

Toolburra South State School opened on 2 June 1879. In 1924 it was renamed Greymare State School. It closed in 1966. It was at 5 Lagoon Creek Road opposite Graymare School Road (28.19914°S 151.75539°E).

== Demographics ==
In the 2016 census, Greymare had a population of 64 people.

In the 2021 census, Greymare had a population of 70 people.

== Education ==
There are no schools in Greymare. The nearest government primary schools are Wheatvale State School in Wheatvale to the north-east and Karara State School in neighbouring Karara to the west. The nearest government secondary school is Warwick State High School in Warwick to the east. There are also non-government schools in Warwick.
