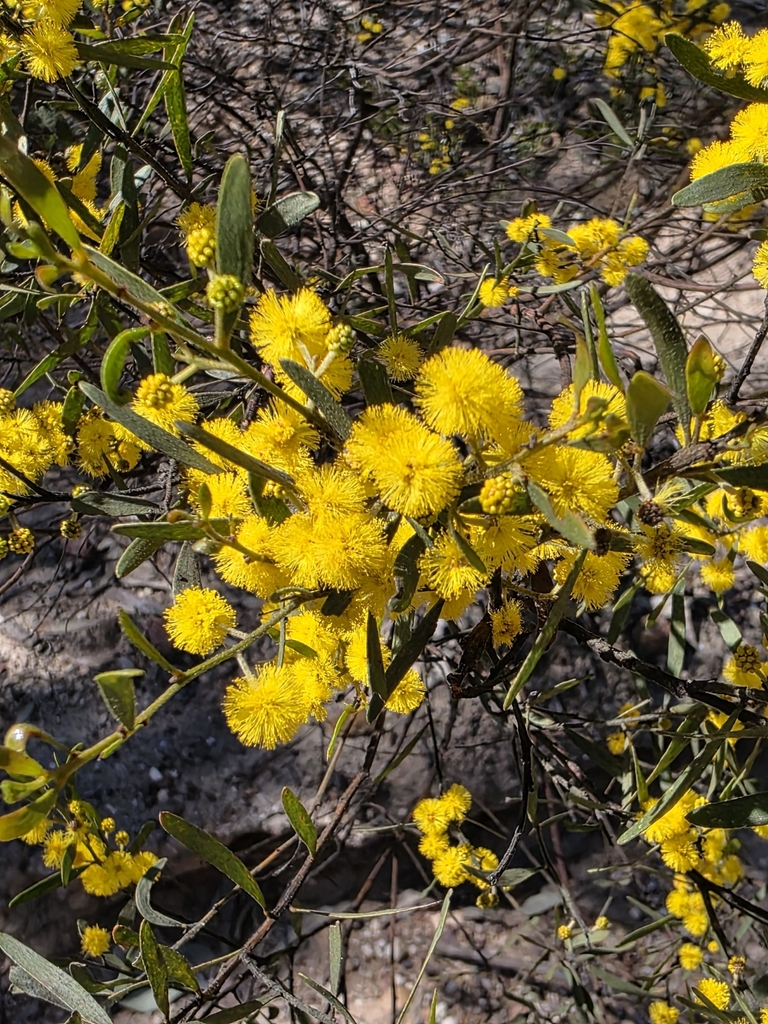
- Near Kartara

Scientific classification
- Kingdom: Plantae
- Clade: Embryophytes
- Clade: Tracheophytes
- Clade: Spermatophytes
- Clade: Angiosperms
- Clade: Eudicots
- Clade: Rosids
- Order: Fabales
- Family: Fabaceae
- Subfamily: Caesalpinioideae
- Clade: Mimosoid clade
- Genus: Acacia
- Species: A. ixiophylla

Binomial name
- Acacia ixiophylla Benth.
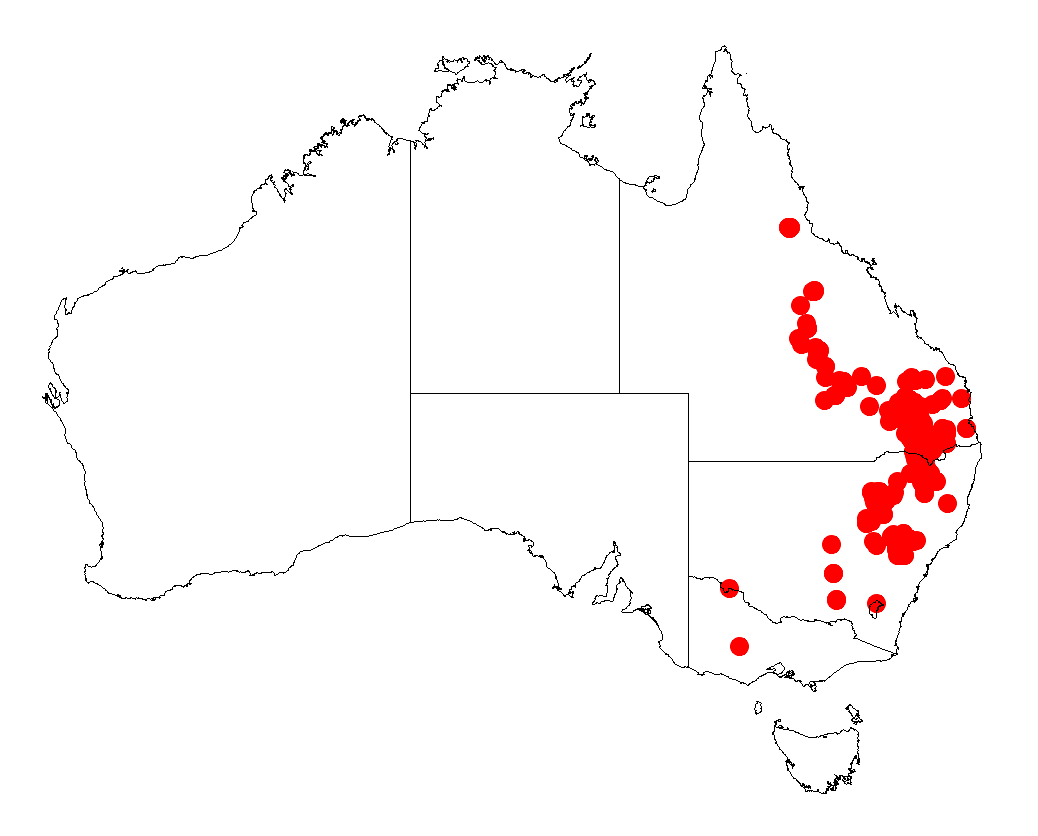
- Occurrence data from AVH

Synonyms
- Acacia fuliginea R.T.Baker; Acacia venulosa var. lanata Benth.; Racosperma ixiophyllum (Benth.) Pedley

= Acacia ixiophylla =

Sticky leaved wattle

Species of legume

Acacia ixiophylla, commonly known as umbrella wattle or sticky leaved wattle, is a species of flowering plant in the family Fabaceae and is endemic to eastern Australia. It is a spreading shrub with leathery, narrowly oblong to elliptic phyllodes, spherical heads of light golden yellow flowers and thinly crusty, linear pods more or less constricted between the seeds.

== Description ==
Acacia ixiophylla is a spreading shrub that typically grows to a height of 1–4 m (3 ft 3 in – 13 ft 1 in) and often has sticky branchlets covered with star-shaped and simple hairs. The phyllodes are leathery, narrowly oblong to elliptic, mostly 20–45 mm (0.79–1.77 in) long, 2–10 mm (0.079–0.394 in) wide and sticky, with three to seven more or less raised veins. The flowers are borne in spherical heads in two or three racemes on peduncles 2–5 mm (0.079–0.197 in) long, each head 5–9 mm (0.20–0.35 in) in diameter with 20 to 45 light golden yellow flowers. Flowering occurs from August to October, and the pods are linear, more or less curved or slightly coiled, up to 70 mm (2.8 in) long, 2–5 mm (0.079–0.197 in) wide and more or less constricted between the seeds. The seeds are oblong to narrowly oblong, 4–5 mm (0.16–0.20 in) long and glossy brown-black with an aril on the end.

== Taxonomy ==
Acacia ixiophylla was first formally described in 1842 by the botanist George Bentham in Hooker's London Journal of Botany from specimens collected north of the Liverpool Plains by Allan Cunningham. The specific epithet (ixiophylla) is in reference to the sticky or viscid nature of the phyllodes.

== Distribution and habitat ==
This wattle is usually found along the western slopes and plains of the Great Dividing Range from Mount Wilson New South Wales to Miles in Queensland with sporadic occurrences as far north as Alpha and near Jericho. It favours gravelly and sandy soils as a part of woodland containing species of Casuarina, Eucalyptus and Callitris.

== Conservation status ==
Acacia ixiophylla is listed as 'least concern' under the Queensland Government Nature Conservation Act 1992.

== See also ==
- List of Acacia species
