= Gore, Queensland =

Gore
- Town
- Interactive map of Gore
- Coordinates: 28.2938°S 151.4897°E
- Country: Australia
- State: Queensland
- LGA: Goondiwindi Region
- Location: 43.1 km (26.8 mi) ENE of Inglewood; 80.2 km (49.8 mi) W of Warwick; 132 km (82 mi) ENE of Goondiwindi; 238 km (148 mi) SW of Brisbane

Government
  - State electorate: Southern Downs
  - Federal division: Maranoa

Area
  - Total: 322.2 km^{2} (124.4 sq mi)

Population
  - Total: 24 (2021 census)
  - Density: 0.0745/km^{2} (0.193/sq mi)
- Time zone: UTC+10:00 (AEST)
- Postcode: 4352
Localities around Gore
Mosquito Creek	Mosquito Creek	Karara
Mosquito Creek	Gore	Karara
Oman Ama	Terrica	Cement Mills

Gore is a rural town and locality in the Goondiwindi Region, Queensland, Australia. In the 2021 census, the locality of Gore had a population of 24 people.

== Geography ==
The Cunningham Highway passes through the locality from the east (Karara) to the south-west (Oman Ama). The South Western railway line also passes through the locality from the east (Karara) to the south-west (Oman Ama) roughly parallel to the highway. The town of Gore is located on the south-eastern boundary of the locality and both the highway and the railway pass through it with the town being served by Gore railway station.

The predominant land use is grazing on native vegetation.

== History ==
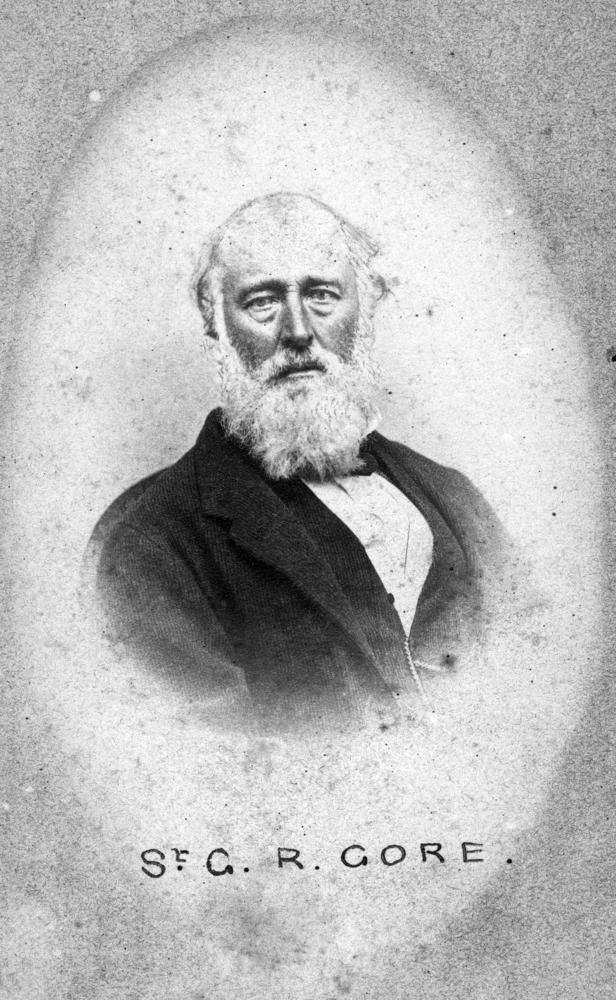
St George Richard Gore, 1862

The town was named after St George Richard Gore, the original lessee of Yandilla pastoral run in 1842.

Gore State School opened on 20 January 1913. In 1927 it became Maxhill State School and then in 1937 Cement Mills State School. It closed in 1975. (The present-day locality of Cement Mills is immediately to the south-east of Gore.)

== Demographics ==
In the 2016 census, the locality of Gore had a population of 36 people.

In the 2021 census, the locality of Gore had a population of 24 people.

== Education ==
There are no schools in Gore. The nearest government primary schools are Karara State School in neighbouring Karara to the north-east and Inglewood State School in Inglewood to the south-west. The nearest government secondary schools are Inglewood State School (to Year 10) and Warwick State High School (to Year 12) in Warwick to the east. Given the distance to Warwick, distance education and boarding schools are other options.

== Amenities ==
There is a petrol station with post office facilities in the town.
