= Acacia flavipila =

Scientific classification
- Kingdom: Plantae
- Clade: Tracheophytes
- Clade: Angiosperms
- Clade: Eudicots
- Clade: Rosids
- Order: Fabales
- Family: Fabaceae
- Subfamily: Caesalpinioideae
- Clade: Mimosoid clade
- Genus: Acacia
- Species: A. flavipila

Binomial name
- Acacia flavipila A.S.George
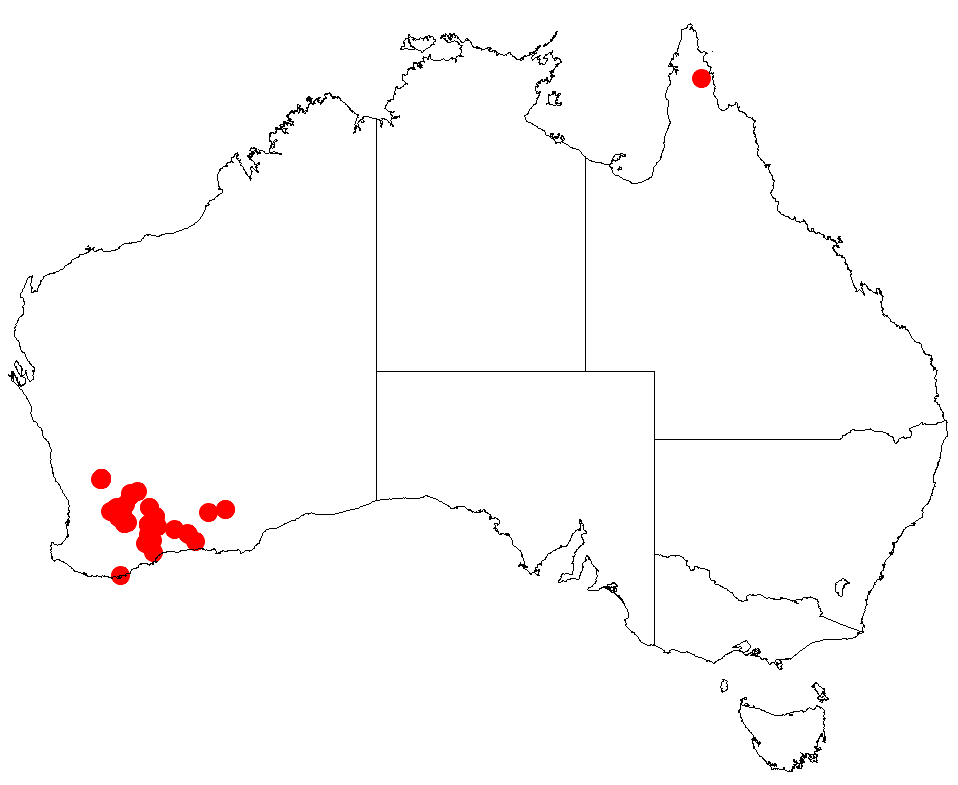
- Occurrence data from AVH

Synonyms
- Acacia aurea C.A.Gardner nom. illeg.; Acacia flavopila A.S.George orth. var.; Racosperma flavipilum (A.S.George) Pedley

Species of legume

Acacia flavipila is a species of flowering plant in the family Fabaceae and is endemic to the south-west of Western Australia. It is a spreading shrub with hairy branchlets, elliptic to oblong or lance-shaped phyllodes with stipules at the base, spherical heads of golden yellow flowers and linear, hairy, curved or coiled pods.

== Description ==
Acacia flavipila is a spreading shrub that typically grows to a height of 0.5–2 m (2–7 ft) and has branchlets that are covered in soft, golden or white hairs, sometimes pressed against the surface. Its phyllodes are elliptic to oblong or lance-shaped with the narrower end towards the base, 10–22 mm (0.39–0.87 in) long and 3–9 mm (0.12–0.35 in) wide with two or three main veins and a gland 1–5 mm (0.039–0.197 in) above the base of the phyllode. There are persistent stipules about 1 mm (0.039 in) long at the base of the phyllodes. The flowers are borne in one or two spherical heads in axils on a peduncle 3–6 mm (0.12–0.24 in) long, each head 4.0–5.5 mm (0.16–0.22 in) in diameter with 28 to 35 golden yellow flowers. Flowering occurs from May to September and the pods are linear, more or less coiled or curved up to 30 mm (1.2 in) long and 3–4 mm (0.12–0.16 in) wide.

== Taxonomy ==
In 1943, Charles Gardner described Acacia aurea in the Journal of the Royal Society of Western Australia but that name was illegitimate because it had already been used for a different taxon, named by Francisco Noronha in 1790.

Acacia flavipila was first formally described in 1966 by Alex George in the Journal of the Royal Society of Western Australia. The specific epithet (flavipila) means 'yellow hair', referring to the hairs on the peduncles, pedicels and young phyllodes.

In 1990, Richard Cowan and Bruce Maslin described two varieties of A. flavipila and the names are accepted by the Australian Plant Census:

- Acacia flavipila A.S.George var. flavipila has elliptic to oblong or lance-shaped phyllodes with the narrower end towards the base and with woolly hairs, two to three times longer than wide.
- Acacia flavipila var. ovalisR.S.Cowan and Maslin has widely elliptic to elliptic phyllodes, glabrous or sparsely hairy, mostly less than twice as long as wide.

== Distribution and habitat ==
This species of wattle is found in scattered locations from near Cadoux and south-east to near Dunn Swamp about 89 km (55 mi) north-east of Ravensthorpe where it grows in sand and clay loam on undulating plains in the Avon Wheatbelt, Esperance Plains and Mallee bioregions of south-western Western Australia.

== Conservation status ==
Both varieties of A. flavipila are listed as "not threatened" by the Government of Western Australia Department of Biodiversity, Conservation and Attractions.

== See also ==
- List of Acacia species
