= Karara, Queensland =

Karara
- Town
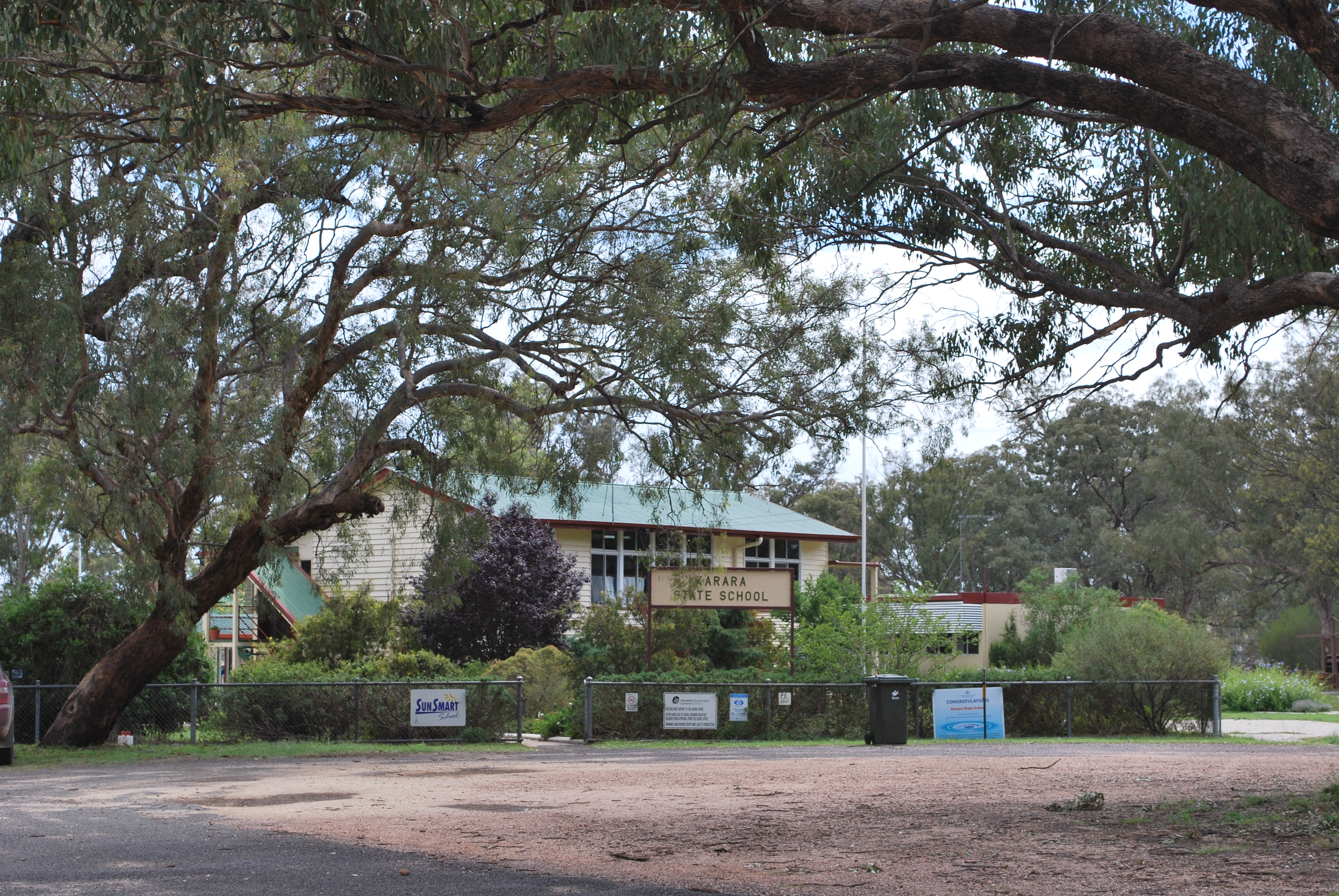
- Karara State School

- Interactive map of Karara
- Coordinates: 28.2080°S 151.5655°E
- Country: Australia
- State: Queensland
- LGA: Southern Downs Region
- Location: 50.6 km (31.4 mi) W of Warwick; 90.2 km (56.0 mi) SW of Toowoomba; 208 km (129 mi) SW of Brisbane; 59 km (37 mi) ENE of Inglewood

Government
  - State electorate: Southern Downs
  - Federal division: Maranoa

Area
  - Total: 353.1 km^{2} (136.3 sq mi)
- Elevation: 477 m (1,565 ft)

Population
  - Total: 128 (2021 census)
  - Density: 0.3625/km^{2} (0.939/sq mi)
- Time zone: UTC+10:00 (AEST)
- Postcode: 4352
Localities around Karara
Stonehenge	Leyburn	Thanes Creek
Mosquito Creek	Karara	Thane
Gore	Cement Mills	Greymare

Karara (/kərærə/) is a rural town and locality in the Southern Downs Region, Queensland, Australia. In the 2021 census, the locality of Karara had a population of 128 people.

== Geography ==
The town is on the Darling Downs on the Cunningham Highway, 208 kilometres (129 mi) south west of the state capital, Brisbane. The highway passes through the locality from the east to the south-west. The Toowoomba–Karara Road (State Route 48) connects the highway through to the north of the locality to Leyburn and ultimately through to Toowoomba. The South Western railway line passes through the locality roughly parallel and to the north of the highway with the locality served by two railway stations:

- Durikai railway station, now abandoned (28.1896°S 151.6153°E)
- Karara railway station, serving the town (28.2091°S 151.5636°E).

Both the line and Karara railway station are no longer in active use.

The Durakai State Forest occupies the southern and eastern areas within the locality; otherwise it is freehold land predominantly used for farming apart from a small urban centre. There are a number of creeks running south to north through the locality which is in the drainage basin of the Condamine River.

== History ==
The name Karara is believed to be an Aboriginal name for Canal Creek.

The South Western railway line from Warwick to Karara was opened in 1904.

Karara State School opened on 20 July 1908.

Karara Post Office opened on 1 July 1927 (a receiving office had been open from 1909) and closed in 1990.

== Demographics ==
In the 2006 census, the locality of Karara and the surrounding area had a population of 140 people.

In the 2011 census, the locality of Karara had a population of 278 people.

In the 2016 census, the locality of Karara had a population of 123 people.

In the 2021 census, the locality of Karara had a population of 128 people.

== Amenities ==
The Southern Downs Regional Council operates a mobile library service which visits the Recreation Reserve.

The Karara branch of the Queensland Country Women's Association meets at the Karara Public Hall at 33 School Street.

== Education ==
Karara State School is a government primary (Prep-6) school for boys and girls at Karara School Road (28.2037°S 151.5652°E). In 2017, the school had an enrolment of 5 students with 3 teachers (2 full-time equivalent) and 5 non-teaching staff (1 full-time equivalent). In 2018, the school had an enrolment of 8 students with 2 teachers (1 full-time equivalent) and 5 non-teaching staff (2 full-time equivalent).

There are no secondary schools in Karara. The nearest government secondary schools are Warwick State High School (to Year 12) in Warwick to the east, Inglewood State School (to Year 10) in Inglewood to the south-west, Millmerran State School (to Year 10) in Millmerran to the north-west, Clifton State High School (to Year 12) in Clifton to the north-east, and Allora State School (to Year 10) in Allora to the north-east.
