= Wheatvale, Queensland =

Wheatvale
- Suburb
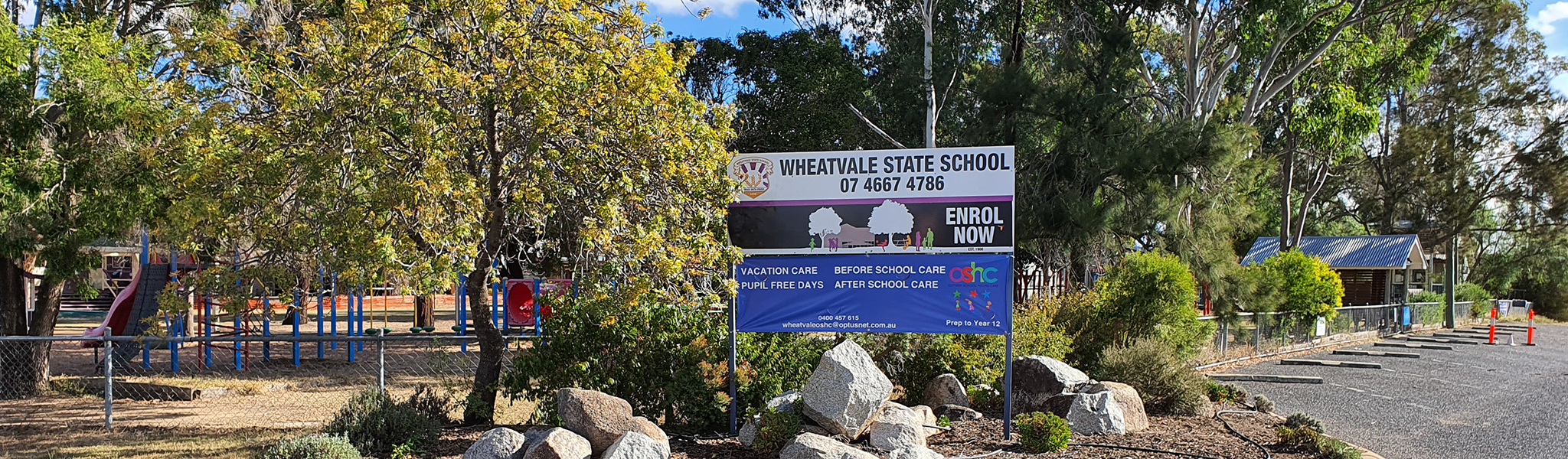
- Wheatvale State School, 2023

- Interactive map of Wheatvale
- Coordinates: 28.1647°S 151.8686°E
- Country: Australia
- State: Queensland
- LGA: Southern Downs Region
- Location: 12.7 km (7.9 mi) SW of Allora; 18.6 km (11.6 mi) WNW of Warwick; 80.8 km (50.2 mi) S of Toowoomba; 172 km (107 mi) SW of Brisbane

Government
  - State electorate: Southern Downs
  - Federal division: Maranoa

Area
  - Total: 15.4 km^{2} (5.9 sq mi)

Population
  - Total: 57 (2021 census)
  - Density: 3.70/km^{2} (9.59/sq mi)
- Time zone: UTC+10:00 (AEST)
- Postcode: 4370
Suburbs around Wheatvale
Bony Mountain	Upper Wheatvale	Massie
Cunningham	Wheatvale	Leslie
Rodgers Creek	Rodgers Creek	Leslie Dam

Wheatvale is a rural locality in the Southern Downs Region, Queensland, Australia. In the 2021 census, Wheatvale had a population of 57 people.

== Geography ==
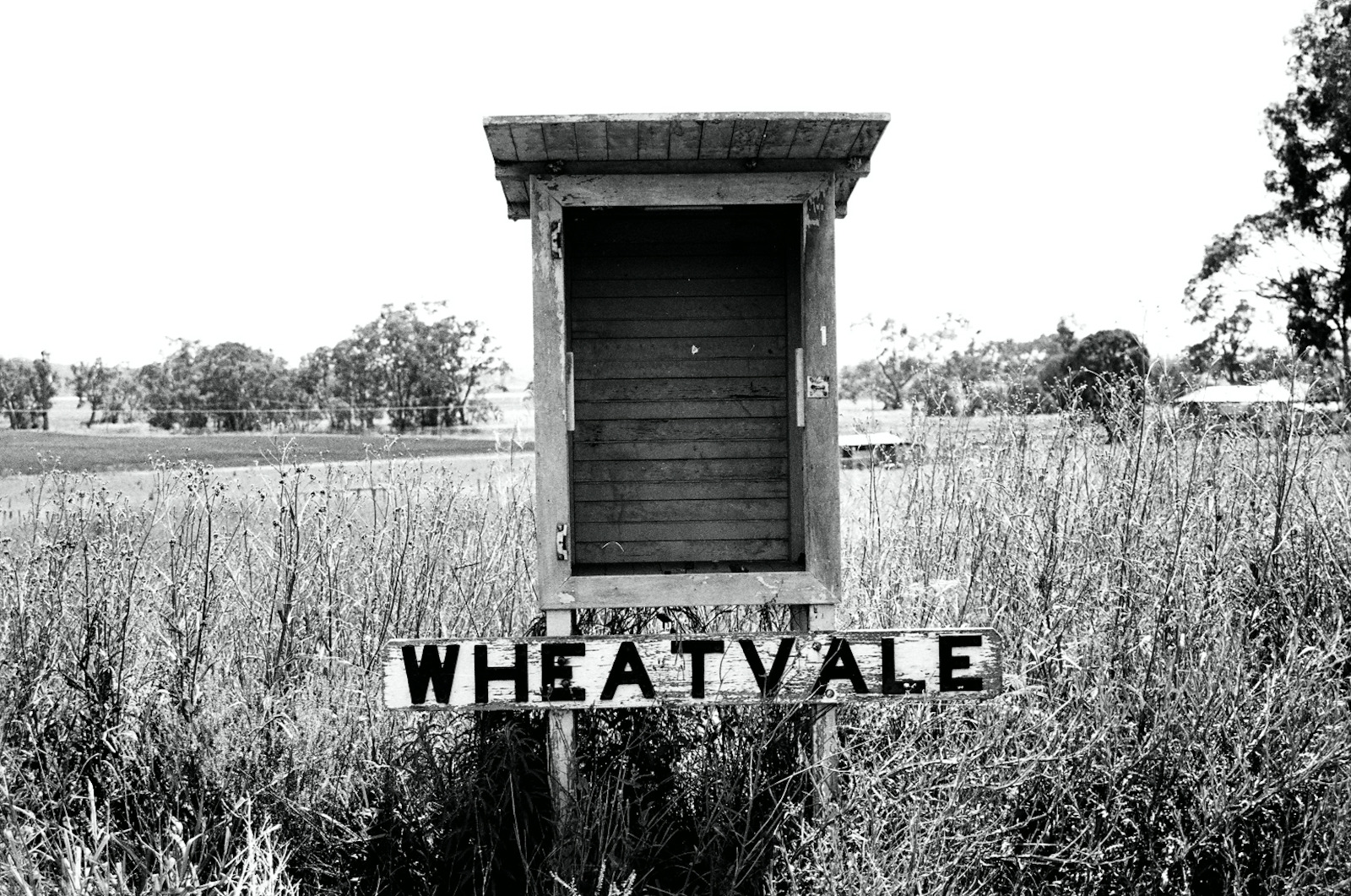
Wheatvale railway station, 1996

The Cunningham Highway passes from east to west through the locality. The South Western railway line also passes from east to west through the locality but to the north of the highway; the locality is served by the Wheatvale railway station (28.1669°S 151.8873°E).

The Condamine River flows through the locality.

The land use is mostly crop growing in the north of the locality and grazing on native vegetation in the south of the locality.

== History ==
The locality takes its name from its railway station which in turn was named on 5 February 1904 by the Queensland Railways Department, after the property of James Clancy McMahon, a pioneer wheat grower in the area.

On 1 April 1896, James Clancy McMahon built and furnished a school building and also paid a teacher's salary. At the start of 1897, it became Wheatvale Provisional School with the teacher being appointed by the Queensland Public Instruction Department. However, the sale of the land on 28 February 1901 caused the school to close. In 1908 Wheatvale Provisional School reopened on a new site and became Wheatvale State School on 1 January 1909.

On 21 June 1924, a group of local women met at the school and formed the Condamine branch of the Queensland Country Women's Association.

== Demographics ==
In the 2016 census, Wheatvale had a population of 56 people.

In the 2021 census, Wheatvale had a population of 57 people.

== Education ==
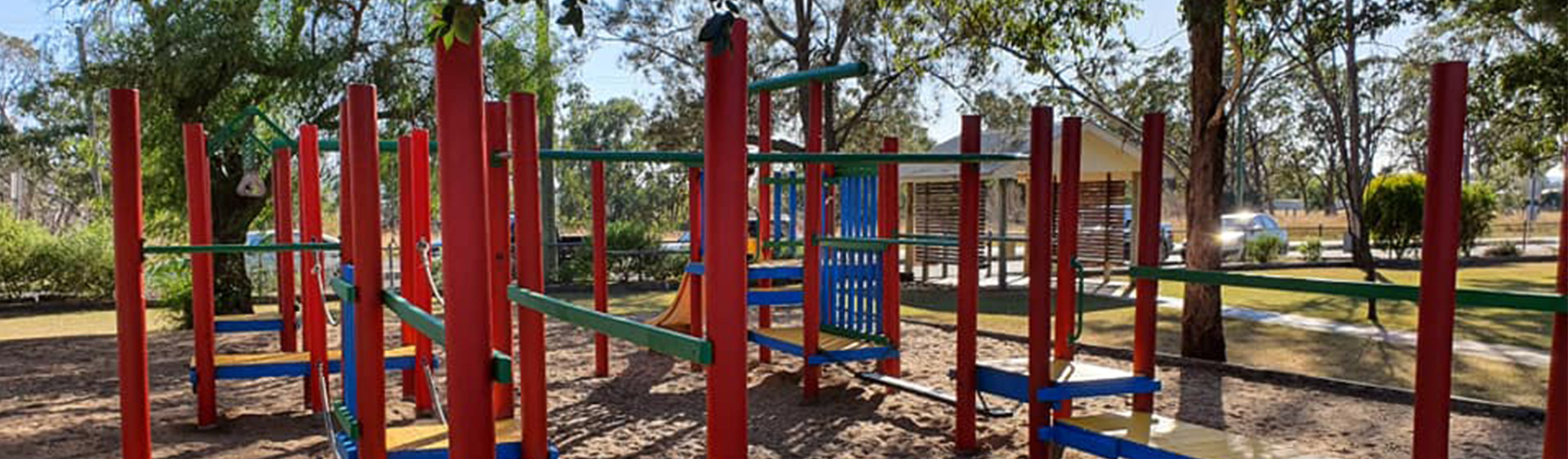
Playground, Wheatvale State School, 2023

Wheatvale State School is a government primary (Prep-6) school for boys and girls at 4194 Leyburn-Cunningham Road (28.1658°S 151.8796°E). In 2016, the school had an enrolment of 53 students with 5 teachers (3 equivalent full-time) and 7 non-teaching staff (3 equivalent full-time). In 2018, the school had an enrolment of 41 students with 3 teachers and 5 non-teaching staff (3 full-time equivalent).

There are no secondary schools in Wheatvale. The nearest government secondary schools are Allora State School (to Year 10) in Allora to the north-east and Warwick State High School (to Year 12) in Warwick to the south-east. There are also non-government schools in Allora and Warwick.

== Amenities ==
The Southern Downs Regional Council operates a mobile library service which visits the Wheatvale School on the Leyburn-Cunningham Road.
