= Warwick State High School =

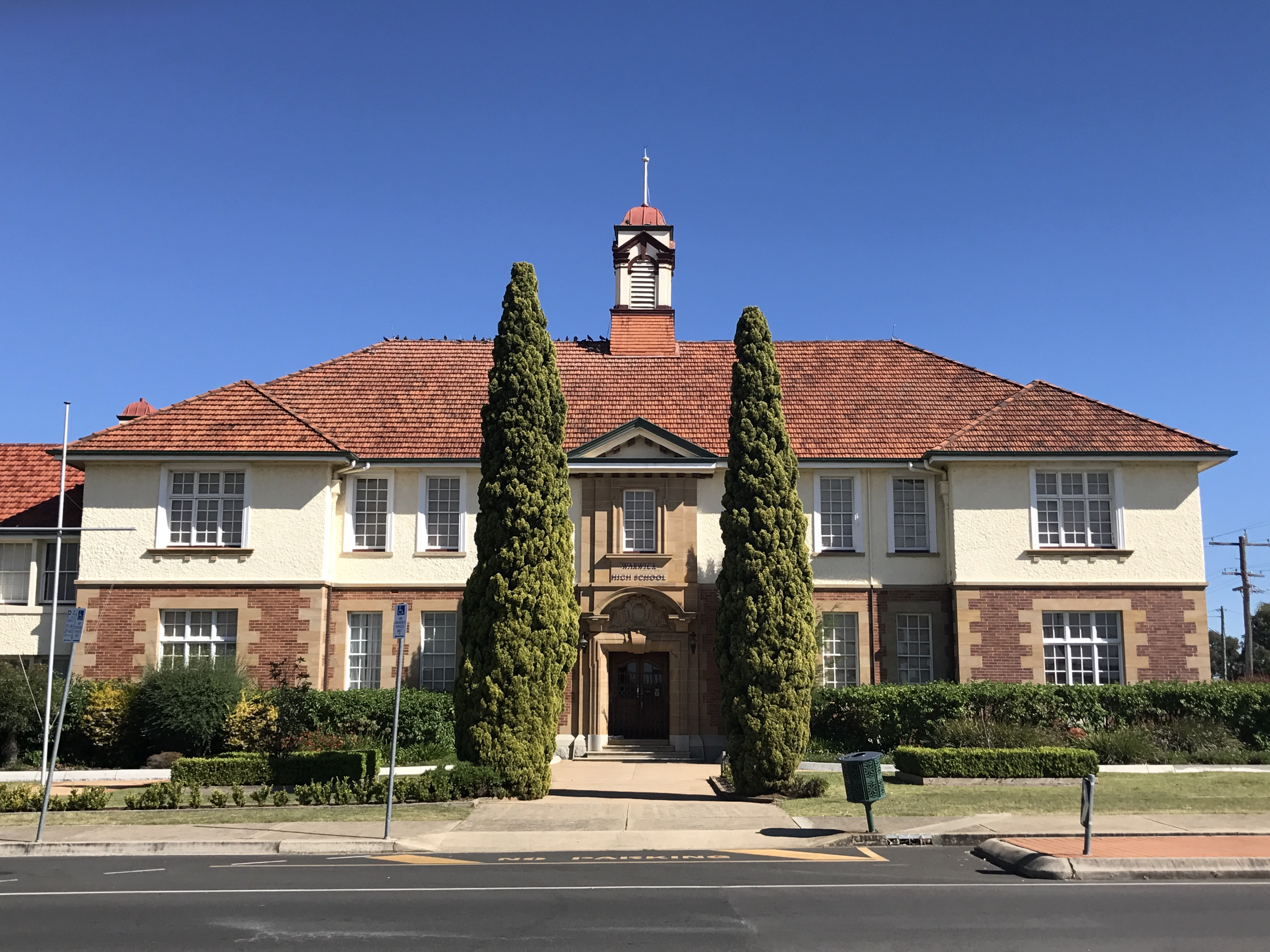
- Warwick High School, 2017

- Location within Queensland
- 28.2105°S 152.0329°E
- Location: 15 Palmerin Street, Warwick, Southern Downs Region, Queensland, Australia

History
- Design period: 1900–1914 (Early 20th century)
- Built: 1914–1915, Block A, 1914, Block B, 1932, Block C, 1958, South connecting wing, two–storey concrete, 1959, North connecting wing, 1963, former plumbing workshop, 1968–1969, Science and toilet block extension

Site notes
- Architect: Thomas Pye
- Architectural style: Classicism

Queensland Heritage Register
- Official name: Warwick State High School; Warwick Technical College / Warwick Intermediate School
- Type: state heritage
- Designated: 28 June 2018
- Reference no.: 650062
- Type: Education, Research, Scientific Facility: School – state (high)
- Theme: Educating Queenslanders: Providing secondary education

Warwick State High School is a heritage-listed state high school at 15 Palmerin Street, Warwick, Southern Downs Region, Queensland, Australia. It was designed by Thomas Pye and Block A was built from 1914 to 1915. It is also known as Warwick Technical College and Warwick Intermediate School. It was added to the Queensland Heritage Register on 28 June 2018.

== History ==
Warwick State High School opened on this site in 1914 as the Warwick Technical College and High School, accommodated in new buildings; having relocated operations from an earlier site in Guy Street. It grew to include Queensland's first intermediate school in 1929, accommodated in a new building in 1932, and developed further to cater for increased high school enrolments in the 1950s and 1960s in new buildings. The buildings were purpose-designed by the Department of Public Works (DPW) and form an attractive cohesive group of state educational buildings from the early to mid-20th century. These are:

- Technical College and High School Buildings
  - Main Building, Block A (1915)
  - Workshops Block, Block B (1914)
- Intermediate School Building
  - Block C (1932)
- High School Buildings:
  - South Connecting Wing (1958)
  - North Connecting Wing (1959)
  - Block F (1963)
  - Block D (1968/9)

Prior to British settlement, the open country of the Darling Downs, named by Allan Cunningham in 1827, had been carefully and deliberately maintained by its Aboriginal owners in an annual pattern of controlled burns to preserve pasture for native grazing animals. British settlement of the Darling Downs, began in 1840 with the Leslie Brothers who were closely followed by other graziers. The town of Warwick, which grew to become the business centre for the southern Darling Downs, was surveyed by James Charles Burnett in 1849, with the first sale of crown land in July 1850. Warwick was declared a municipality in 1861 and was subsequently transformed from a squatters' town into the principal urban centre of this prosperous pastoral and agricultural district. The construction of the Southern railway line linking Brisbane, Toowoomba, Warwick and the tin mines of Stanthorpe reached Warwick in January 1871, and fuelled further development. As Warwick grew, its local industries remained related to primary production including: flour milling, butter and cheese production, bacon processing, sawmilling, coach and wagon works, followed in the 20th century by motor repairs and engineering works. All of these industries required a skilled workforce.

Throughout the 19th century, the only avenue for technical education in Queensland was through the local schools of arts where courses in trades were conducted. The quality and variety of instruction depended on the competence and enthusiasm of committee members. During the late 1880s, several committees established technical colleges in existing school of arts buildings, but as the range of courses and number of students increased, separate accommodation was necessary. Queensland's first purpose-built technical college was the Queen Victoria Silver Jubilee Memorial Technical Collegewhich opened in Ipswich in 1901, followed by Warwick's (1906), Mount Morgan Technical College (1909), and Toowoomba Technical College (1911) . Reflecting the importance of the mining industry to Charters Towers, the Charters Towers School of Mines was established in there in 1901, which fulfilled a similar role to a technical college but with a focus on mining.

In the early 1900s the Queensland Government began to take a more active interest in technical colleges. In the late 1890s through to 1914, Queensland's manufacturing sector grew substantially, creating a need for a more skilled workforce in a variety of trades.

The Board of Technical Education was established in 1902, replaced by a Technical Education Branch within the Department of Public Instruction in 1905, and the Technical Instruction Act 1908 empowered the government to take over existing technical colleges. Locally managed technical colleges gradually came under departmental control and the government also established new colleges in several centres, including Maryborough, Bundaberg, Rockhampton and Mackay.

Technical education in Warwick began with the formation of a school of arts, which initially met in the courthouse before establishing itself in a building in Palmerin Street in 1869. A technical college began in the School of Arts boardroom in 1895. This space was soon inadequate and a site was acquired on the corner of Fitzroy and Guy Street where a new building was opened in 1906, financed through local subscriptions. A two-storey extension facing Guy Street was completed in 1909.

Concurrently, an approach had been made to the Minister for Public Instruction to offer high school education in Warwick at the technical college. This phase of education was referred to as a Day School. The Warwick Day School began classes in the Guy Street technical college on 1 July 1910. Warwick was the first town in regional Queensland to have a technical high school under government control. The Warwick Technical High School was officially opened on 8 August 1910. It was noted that during the previous 4.5 years, £5,812 had been spent on technical college works in Warwick, £2,450 of which were raised locally and that the college had been handed over to the government free of debt.

Demand for further education was high and by December 1910 it was evident that a new site was needed for a larger technical college and high school. After a local referendum in September 1912, two acres (0.8ha) of land was resumed from Cunningham Park in 1913 for a new technical college and high school. Cunningham Park was originally part of the Town Reserve surveyed in 1849, dedicated as a reserve for Public Recreation in 1855 and gazetted as a Recreation Reserve in 1868. In 1901, this reserve was divided into two 10 acre (4.05ha) reserves creating Leslie Park in the southern section and Cunningham Park in the northern section.

Queensland prosperity grew in the first decades of the 20th century from a mineral boom and agricultural pursuits, enabling the government to implement a campaign of construction of large public buildings. This included substantial brick or timber school buildings. From the beginnings of purpose-built education buildings until the 1950s, brick school buildings were far less frequently built than those of timber. If brick was employed, it was only in prosperous urban or suburban areas with stable or rapidly-increasing populations. Like Queensland's private schools, technical colleges and schools of arts, rather than being built to a standard plan, all brick and some timber school buildings were individually designed with variation in style, size, and form. These few were given generous budgets, resulting in impressive edifices. Light and ventilation was still a primary concern for the architects but compared to contemporary standard education buildings, these buildings had a grander character and greater landmark attributes.

Queensland Government Architect Thomas Pye called tenders for the new Warwick Technical College and High School buildings in July 1913. HD Miller's £11,500 tender was accepted in August, but the contract was later awarded to Donald James Hutchings. The foundation stone was laid 28 February 1914 by the Queensland Governor, Sir William McGregor.

The main Technical College and High School building (in 2018 named Block A) was a two-storey masonry structure on a Greymare granite base, with a Marseilles tiled roof with a fleche. The walls were face brick and roughcast stucco with Yangan freestone dressings. A carved sandstone coat of arms over the doorway featured the motto of the school: "Virtute et Labore" (by hard work and excellence), carved by the art master Charles Astley. The interior, with its wide entrance hall with reinforced concrete staircase, provided teaching space for commercial subjects, chemistry, and a lecture and examination hall. The building included a two-storey toilet block joined by a first floor walkway. The block had an iron fire escape stair and a concrete septic tank was added to the rear (western side) of the block in 1923.

A separate two-storey Workshops Block (in 2018 named Block B) was built prior to Block A, standing to its west. It was completed in May 1914 when classes commenced, while the earlier Technical College in Guy Street, remained in use for some time. Block B housed a blacksmithing and plumbing workshop and two forges on the ground floor, with a carpenter and joinery workshop and a geometric drawing room on the first floor.

Both buildings were heated by gas, and served by electricity, with synchronised clocks. The buildings cost in excess of £12,000 and were officially opened by the Queensland Governor, His Excellency Sir Hamilton John Goold-Adams, in October 1915. The school buildings complemented existing substantial masonry structures in Warwick, many also built using Yangan freestone. Pye was acting Government Architect and responsible for numerous substantial government buildings including the Toowoomba Technical College, Mackay Technical College, Rockhampton Technical College 600789 and Brisbane's Central Technical College. The granite and sandstone were locally sourced with the granite coming from Greymare, about 30 km west of Warwick.

Educational reforms between 1909 and 1914 resulted in the introduction of high schools, expansion of technical colleges, inauguration of the University of Queensland, and initiation of a teachers training college. Warwick was fast becoming a "school town", with the opening of a number of private boarding and day schools from 1912 offering primary and secondary education. These included: Our Lady of the Assumption College (1893, high school from 1912), St Joseph's Christian Brothers College for boys (1912); Church of England Girls School (1917); Presbyterian Girls' College (1918); Scots College (1919) and the Slade School (1926). The Queensland Country Women's' Association provided hostel accommodation to students attending Warwick State High School from January 1928.

Art master of the Warwick Technical College from 1908 was Charles Astley (1869–1929), an accomplished artist and musician. He learnt woodcarving from Edith Robinson and taught art classes on behalf of the technical college at Milton Ladies College (Pringle Cottage), Tannymorel, Clifton, Stanthorpe, and Killarney. He began teaching china painting in 1914, which required kiln firing, so he also initiated pottery classes. Warwick acquired a pottery kiln in May 1918, prior to Brisbane's Central Technical College where pottery had been taught since 1916. The first kiln was located on the ground floor of the workshops block but Astley had difficulties with this kiln. A new imported kiln was purchased in 1922 and a small brick lean-to room was added to the rear (western side) of the workshops block, costing £75 and built to accommodate it. This kiln was connected into a pre-existing chimney. The chimney was most likely part of the original construction of the workshops block (1914) despite not appearing on original drawings.

Warwick Technical College, under Astley's direction, pioneered the teaching and production of pottery in Queensland. This was more than a decade prior to the inclusion of ceramics courses in institutions such as the Royal Melbourne Institute of Technology. Astley's students' pottery work was exhibited in the Brisbane Exhibition in 1921 and 1923 and he submitted a display to the British Empire Exhibition at Wembley Stadium in 1924, for which he received a bronze medal. Astley's health failed, and following a brief time during 1925 when he established the art department at the Rockhampton Technical College, he was forced to retire at age 56, and died in 1929. Many of his works are retained in private collections, and some are held in the Queensland Art Gallery and the Tasmanian Museum and Art Gallery. Astley (also a violinist) was a major figure in the cultural life of Warwick, having organised and participated in an orchestral concert in May 1912, to fund-raise for the new technical college building. Astley experimented with local clays, sourced from Stanthorpe, Sladeville and Rosenthal. One piece by Gladys Fell, "Kookaburra bowl", is part of the Queensland Art Gallery collection. Charles Astley also pioneered wood carving and established a successful correspondence art course while at Warwick Technical College. Astley's granddaughter Thea was one of Queensland's most accomplished authors.

The next phase of the development of the school campus came with the introduction of an intermediate school. This concept emerged in Queensland during the late 1920s, as a transition between primary and secondary schooling. Intermediate schools catered for years six and seven, and offered vocational subjects as well as a transition towards the Junior (Year 10) and Senior (Year 12) Certificates. Junior Certificates were available for General, Commercial Industrial, Home Science, Agriculture or Art. The completion of Senior could lead to enrolment at the University of Queensland, which at that time offered 25 scholarships per year. The intermediate system operated until the early 1960s.

The first state intermediate schools were established within existing school facilities at Warwick, Charters Towers, Mount Morgan and South Brisbane from 1928. In February 1929, the Minister for Education, the Hon. Thomas Wilson, opened the first intermediate school in Queensland at the Warwick Technical College and High School. The first group of 98 students were housed in the top storey of the workshops block. The top floor of the old Technical College in Guy Street was used for manual arts training. Queensland's first purpose-built intermediate school was opened in Roma in December 1929.

A new purpose-built Intermediate School building, the second in Queensland, was erected at Warwick Technical College in 1932 (in 2018 named Block C). It was designed by DPW architect Harold Parr and built by Thomas R Porter for £7866. It was situated at right angles to the existing buildings, overlooking Cunningham Park, and was built to a complementary design. The two storey building had a Greymare granite base with face brick and roughcast stucco walls, stucco quoins, bands and architraves, and a tall hipped roof clad with tiles with a central metal ventilation fleche. The ground floor comprised four classrooms separated by folding partitions to allow conversion for assemblies, teachers room, and toilets. The first floor had two classrooms, a drawing, and a science room, teachers room, and toilets. The classrooms on both levels, were on the southern side of the building with banks of large casement windows enabling high levels of southern light and natural ventilation. The Minister for Education, the Hon. Frank Cooper, officially opened the building on 7 October 1932, and classes began in November.

By 1937, there were intermediate schools established in Brisbane South (Brisbane State High School, Block H) (1929), Mount Morgan State High School) (1929), Roma (1929), Charters Towers (1929), Gatton (1933), Gympie (1933), Bundaberg (1933), Mackay (Mackay Central State School) (1933), Brisbane North (Kelvin Grove) (1935), Maryborough Girls and Boys (Maryborough Boys Grammar School) (1936), and Ayr (Ayr State High School) (1936). Most were accomplished through re-use or remodelling of existing buildings. Six buildings at Roma, Warwick, Mackay, Bundaberg (demolished), Ayr, and Brisbane North (Kelvin Grove) were purpose-built structures.

From 1948, land parcels approximately 300m to the north of the school, close to the river, were gradually resumed to provide new school land separate from the main campus. From 1950, a committee of parents, staff, and past students had fund-raised to convert this paddock into a sports field; named Hamilton Oval in 1951. In 1954, further land was acquired to establish an agricultural school. Both land areas were later amalgamated (now Lot 553 SP195965). Hamilton Oval was named after the first principal of the technical college and high school, Robert Campbell Hamilton, who was principal from 1914 until 1948. The Agricultural School building, designed by Jim Levin was completed in 1962.

The campus was connected to the town's sewerage system in 1943. This necessitated a number of changes of fixtures and fittings of most plumbing items throughout the school.

In the late 1950s, two two-storey connecting wings were built; a north wing between Block A and B and a south wing between Block A and C, within the school's restrained 2 acre (0.8ha) site. This created an enclosed courtyard campus. From 1 July 1957 construction began on the South Connecting Wing between Blocks A and C at a cost of £19,693. The project included the re-use of freestone removed from the window openings of the technical college building, cut and dressed to be reused in the new wing, and was designed to have "sympathetic consideration of the aesthetic relationship" to the existing structure in order to "preserve its integrity". It housed science labs on the ground floor and classrooms on the first floor. It was completed by 1 March 1958.

Work began immediately on the North Connecting Wing between Block A and B. This link, with large banks of awning windows, was designed by consulting architect Jim Leven. The wing, built in brick and timber, cost £28,064 and was likely completed by December 1959. It did not repeat all design elements of the early structures but was consciously designed so as not to detract from the existing structures. Three classrooms were provided on the ground floor with art, drawing, and dressmaking accommodated on the well-lit first floor. Both connecting wings illustrate DPW's commitment to improved lighting and ventilation for schools at this time. The upper floor of Block B was used for woodworking with bench accommodation for 32 students. Timber was stored in the loft. The ground floor was to be converted for welding, plumbing and metalwork.

Cunningham Park, occupying the land adjacent to the school, was used for sporting activities by the public and school community. The school constructed a tennis court and cricket pitch within the park during the 1930s (in 2018 two multi-purpose courts remain). The EJ Portley Olympic Pool opened in October 1957 in the southeast corner of Cunningham Park. In August 1964, the two acre (0.8ha) site was gazetted as a Reserve for School Purposes (R. 484). In 1966, the Warwick State High School Parents and Citizens' Association (P & C) requested control over this land, because Hamilton Oval was too far away for lunch-time sport and recreation.

Further additions were made to the school in the 1960s. A plumbing workshop (in 2018 named Block F) was completed at the commencement of the 1963 school year. The 98 ft (30m) by 38 ft (11.5m) slab on ground brick veneer and steel portal frame building, with east-facing skylight cost £17,500 and comprised two large workshop rooms, one for metalwork and one for plumbing. This was built to a standard type developed by the DPW. The north–south alignment of this building provided easy access for materials delivered directly from Victoria Street into a large door facing the street. Concurrently, the intermediate school ceased to exist with the demise of the Scholarship exam.

The Education Act 1964 was a turning point and the first major update of Queensland education's governing legislation since 1875. Effectively, a new era of state education evolved, requiring new architectural responses. The Department of Education (as it had been renamed in 1957) continued to give the responsibility of building design to the architects of the DPW. In 1964 construction began on a new brick and timber Science and Toilet Block extension with (in 2018 named Block D) extending from the west end of Block C. Extensive ground floor toilets and showers were built first (1964–65), costing £20,475, and science laboratories with preparation rooms were subsequently added to the first floor (1968–69) costing $70,420. The series of south-facing classrooms had large banks of windows to provide ample natural light and ventilations and were accessed by a long northern verandah. Minor alterations were made the west end of Block C for connecting access. The new building was built to a standard DPW plan, which included steel open web floor joists to provide unencumbered space underneath. This space was generally open for recreation, but at Warwick's small site it had to accommodate much needed toilets and showers.

The construction of Block D highlighted the diminishing recreational space on the school campus. The P & C sought the allocation of Cunningham Park to the school, which led to: the cancellation of the Recreation Reserve (R.269 - Cunningham Park); extension of the school reserve (R.484) and creation of a new reserve on the south western side of the park. The swimming pool was in a separate reserve. These were all gazetted in November 1968. The extension of the school reserve 8.9m to the west allowed for the construction of a new science wing at that time.

In July 1977 Warwick State High School officially acquired the adjacent land (Lot 2 W30131 - previously reserve for playground) as part of the high school and the campus grew into this space. With new educational philosophies from the mid-1960s-1980s, government policies and functional requirements combined with new architectural styles, materials and technologies, the evolution of standard designs became more fragmented. Rather than "improving" on the previous designs, architects began to design with inspiration drawn from new precedents. Fundamentally, timber construction was no longer favoured and buildings were no longer predominantly highset.

Fund-raising began for the construction of a hall in the early 1970s. The Great Hall was completed in 1977 and a First Year Centre in 1978. This was built on vacant land between Block C and the council swimming pool. This building blocked any views of Block C to and from Palmerin Street and the former Cunningham Park, which it originally overlooked. The beautification of the school grounds during the late 1970s and early 1980s have been credited to the principal Bob Rasmussen and his family; particularly the maintenance of the gardens facing Palmerin Street.

In c. 1978 Block F was extended to the west and the ground floor of the North Connecting Wing was altered to accommodate additional art classes, including the demolition of columns and the wall between classrooms and the corridor. A new library building was completed in 1986.

Warwick State High School continued to provide technical education evening classes for tradesmen into the 1980s, until the establishment of the Warwick TAFE College in 1988. The conversion of the upper floor of Block B into a drama theatre in the early 1980s saw the carpentry work shop benches transferred to Block F. In c. 2001 a second extension was made on the west side of Block F to accommodate increased manual training facilities. A new art/science block was completed in 2006. In 2004 the school site merged Lots 1 W30106 (school site) and Lot 2 W30131 (its playground reserve acquired in 1977) creating Lot 3 SP171821.

The school celebrated its centenary in 2002 with a significant publication acknowledging the history and achievements of the school. In 2016, the school enrolments for Warwick State High School were 893. In 2018 Warwick State High School continues to operate from its original site and retains its two-storey brick Technical College and High School building, Workshops Block, Intermediate School and 1950s North and South Connecting Wings, and former Plumbing Workshop and Science Wing with Toilet Block extension. It remains the only state high school in Warwick and is a key social focus for the community, as generations of students have been taught there and many social events held in the school's grounds and buildings since its establishment.

== Description ==
Warwick State High School occupies a large (2.6ha) site fronting east to Palmerin Street, the main thoroughfare in Warwick. It is bounded on its other sides by Victoria Street to the north, Guy Street to the west, and other community buildings to the south.

The seven significant buildings within the school complex are:

- Block A (a former technical college and high school classroom building including a rear toilet block) facing Palmerin Street
- Block B (a former technical college workshops block) standing to the rear of Block A
- North Connecting Wing (a high school classroom building linking Block A and B) facing Victoria Street
- Block C (a former intermediate school classroom building) standing to the south of Block A
- South Connecting Wing (a high school classroom building linking Block A and C)
- Block D (a high school classroom building) extending west from Block C
- Block F (a high school former plumbing workshop building) standing to the north of Block D

The buildings form a cohesive family complex through their shared material palette, scale, and well-considered arrangement around an open bitumen courtyard.

The open courtyard affords the surrounding buildings natural ventilation and light, views between, to, and from the buildings, and clear space for pedestrian circulation. Later covered steel-framed walkways and shade structures are not of state-level heritage significance.

Attractive views to the buildings are had from Palmerin and Victoria Streets and the buildings are highly visible within the townscape from surrounding vantage points. The grounds are well-established and include a mature front garden on Palmerin Street symmetrically laid out in front of Block A, and featuring concrete paths and garden beds with original granite edging, twin cypress pines at the front boundary, lawn, and shrubbery.

=== Block A: Technical College classroom building (1915) ===
Block A is a highly-intact symmetrical, two-storey masonry teaching building. H-shaped in plan, it has well-composed elevations comprising a granite base, face brick walls on the lower level and a stucco upper level. It has a tall hipped roof clad in tiles with ventilated eaves and a prominent metal ventilation fleche. Large, timber-framed, double-hung windows with stone lintels are regularly spaced around all sides. The front entrance is emphasised by elaborate sandstone dressings and a striking carved stone school emblem. A small entrance vestibule retains an early iron security shutter, encaustic tessellated floor tiles, and a large clear-finished timber and glazed front door with glazed fanlight.

The internal layout of both levels is similar, retaining original rendered partitions and wing walls with scribed skirting board line and timber ceiling lining and cornice. Timber window and door architraves, as well as window hardware survives. The ground floor layout comprises a short entrance hall which leads to a perpendicular hallway with teaching rooms opening on either side. A wide concrete stair stands at the rear (west side) of the building with an iron balustrade and moulded, clear-finished timber handrail. It provides access to the first floor, which has a similar layout. Few openings have been made in the original plaster partitions on both levels, however, lightweight partitions (not significant) have been inserted to make former large classrooms into smaller administration and teaching spaces. The building has timber floor framing generally with suspended concrete slab floors in the circulation spaces with Linoleum and carpet floors (not significant) placed over.

Features of state-level heritage significance also include:

- a concrete bench and an early electric light fitting with glass shade in the former chemistry balance room and an adjacent glazed timber framed partition
- early door, window, and fanlight hardware
- original, decorative, classically-styled, moulded, round-arch openings with pilasters and square pediments located around the centre of the entry hall
- original and early timber joinery: silky oak enquiry window surround with reception desk, skirting boards, door and window architraves, dado panelling, timber notices board, panelled and glazed doors with fanlights, fitted cupboards
- timber lattice ceiling vents
- wall-mounted honour boards and student achievement boards, timber notices cabinet, framed Wembley art medal, early framed photographs, and school paraphernalia
- concrete spoon drains at the base of the exterior

A highly-intact, two-storey toilet block stands to the rear (west) of Block A, connected by a short first floor timber-framed walkway. The walkway retains V-jointed (VJ) timber board ceiling lining, post brackets, balustrade and lattice. The toilet block has face brick and stucco walls, highset timber-framed windows and a hipped roof clad in tiles. An original metal fire escape stair is attached to the rear (west) wall, and a half-buried concrete septic tank (1923) stands immediately south of the toilet block.

=== Block B: Workshops Block (1914) ===
Block B is a highly-intact, two-storey, symmetrical, masonry building, formerly used for manual training workshops. It has face brick and roughcast stucco walls with brick quoining to the corners and a tall hipped roof clad in tiles with vented timber louvered gablets. Timber-framed double hung windows with stone sills are regularly-spaced on all sides: some have been closed up to accommodate construction of the North Connecting Wing. The ground floor is a suspended concrete slab and the first floor is timber-framed, supported on large steel I beams stamped DORMAN LONG + CO LTD - MIDDLESBOROUGH - ENGLAND. The building includes an early roughcast stucco and brick chimney, a gantry crane on the roof above the large first floor doors, and white tuck pointing survives on some walls.

A timber-framed verandah runs along the east side (front) with original small weatherboard-clad enclosures at the south end on both levels (originally lavatory rooms). The enclosures have early but not original timber-framed casement windows. The remaining verandah has been enclosed and a wide stair added on the first floor: these later alterations are not of state-level heritage significance.

A small single storey face brick annexe with skillion roof (the former kiln room) is attached to the building on its west side.

The internal layout of the building comprises a single large former workshop space on the first floor, whilst the ground floor has been divided into smaller spaces.

The original stairs have been demolished and access to the first floor is via a stair in the adjacent North Connecting Wing and via a recent external stair on the west side of the building. A stage has been inserted at one end of the first floor. The external stair and stage are not of state-level heritage significance.

Features of state-level heritage significance also include:

- joinery including: window and door architraves, fanlights, early door, window, and fanlight hardware
- V-jointed (VJ) timber board ceiling lining in workshops and verandahs
- exposed roof trusses and small timber-framed loft
- two early timber cupboards in the first floor verandah
- concrete spoon drains at the base of the exterior

=== Block C: Intermediate School Building (1932) ===
Block C is a highly-intact, two-storey, symmetrical masonry teaching building with a tall hipped roof clad with tiles, ventilated eaves, and a prominent metal ventilation fleche. It has a granite base, face brick and roughcast stucco walls, and smooth-finished concrete dressings with ground floor quoining to corners and windows. The building faces north and has a projecting central bay, which accommodates toilets and teachers rooms. This is flanked by two entrances sheltered by tiled awnings with large timber doors with glazing. The north and south elevations feature large regularly-spaced banks of timber-framed casement windows with awning fanlights. Toothed bricks on the south corners indicate planned but unbuilt extensions. The building has concrete floors in the circulation spaces and toilets, and timber-framed floors in the classrooms and teachers rooms.

The internal layout of both floors comprises a central corridor that runs from east to west and provides access to rooms on either side: a series of standard width classrooms (21 ft) on the south side, and bathrooms and teachers rooms on the north. At either end of the corridor is a concrete stair with iron balustrade and timber handrail. The classrooms of the ground floor have had the folding partitions between classrooms replaced with fixed partitions, which are not of state-level heritage significance. Doors and windows in the ground floor verandah wall have been removed.

Features of state-level heritage significance also include:

- joinery including: skirting boards; architraves, French doors into classrooms, panelled doors, double-hung windows, fanlights, timber cupboards in stairwells
- coved concrete skirtings and coved window and door surrounds in circulation spaces
- sheets-and-battens ceilings
- lattice ventilation panel in corridor ceiling
- early door, window, and fanlight hardware
- concrete spoon drains at the base of the exterior

=== South Connecting Wing (1958) ===
The South Connecting Wing is a highly-intact two-storey teaching building linking Blocks A and C. It is L-shaped in plan and has a tall hipped roof clad with tiles, and has ventilated eaves. It has a hybrid concrete, steel I-beam, and timber structure. It faces east to Palmerin Street with face brick and roughcast stucco walls, a recessed ground floor entrance with panelled timber doors emphasised by freestone quoining, and pairs of timber-framed double-hung windows.

The south elevation has face brick walls and is extensively glazed with banks of timber-framed awning windows with fanlights and crimped metal sheet spandrel panels.

A timber-framed first floor verandah runs along the inner side (north and west) of the building, connecting with the circulation spaces of Blocks A and C. Bagracks form the balustrade which is clad in crimped metal sheets and has been enclosed later with aluminium-framed windows that are not of heritage significance. The verandah wall is rendered and has timber-framed double-hung windows with brick sills.

The layout of both floors comprises classrooms and former storerooms to the south of the verandah, with a former medical room (ground floor) and teacher's room (first floor) to the east. A short front entry hall with concrete floor has a concrete stair with steel balustrade and timber handrail up to the first floor. One partition between classrooms on the first floor has been removed.

Features of state-level heritage significance also include:

- joinery including: wide, glazed French doors with fanlight on the ground floor, architraves, and skirtings
- flat sheet wall and ceiling linings with D-shaped cover strips on the ceiling
- sliding timber-framed blackboard in ground floor classroom
- early door, window, and fanlight hardware

=== North Connecting Wing (1959) ===
The North Connecting Wing is a two-storey teaching building connecting Blocks A and B. It is a long narrow building with a shallow-pitched skillion roof clad with metal sheets. Its long sides face north and south and are extensively glazed with banks of timber-framed awning windows with fanlights and a crimped metal sheet spandrel. At the west and east end of the building is a face brick stairwell with large steel-framed windows with wired glass. The building fronts Victoria Street with an entrance comprising a concrete apron and timber-framed double doors with glazing. An original entrance awning has been demolished and replaced with a larger steel awning. This and other awnings and an adjacent fence are later and not of state-level heritage significance.

The first floor is supported on steel open-web trusses on concrete columns exposed within the ground floor rooms, however, some columns have been removed. The layout is not intact, with its original partitions mostly demolished and new partitions inserted to a different configuration. Wall linings and first floor ceiling linings are not original.

Features of state-level heritage significance also include:

- ground floor ceilings lined with flat sheets with D-shaped cover strips
- concrete stairs with steel balustrade
- early hardware on external window and fanlights

=== Block D: Science and Toilet Block Extension (1968/69) ===
Block D is an intact two-storey teaching building extending from the west end of Block C. It is long and narrow with its long sides facing north and south and has a gable roof clad with metal sheets. The first floor is supported on a hybrid system of steel open web trusses on concrete columns (1964) exposed within the ground floor spaces, and steel beams and posts (1968/9). The ground floor comprises an open play area and a large toilet and showers block. A stair at the west end of the building provides access up to the first floor. The first floor comprises a verandah running along the north side providing access to a series of former science classrooms on the south side. The verandah has square timber posts and a solid balustrade clad with flat sheets. The ground floor has face brick and roughcast stucco walls between concrete columns with high-level windows of glass louvres with face brick sills. The play area has a concrete floor and is shielded by a patterned breeze block wall. The first floor walls are flat sheets with cover strips and the long sides are extensively glazed with louvres and fixed glass. The eaves are ventilated. In 2018 the roof ridge is conventional and does not have ventilators as shown in original drawings; t is not evident if these were ever built.

The layout of the ground floor toilets and showers is highly intact, with masonry partitions dividing the large space into separate boys and girls toilets, change rooms, and showers, staff toilets, janitor room, and cleaner room. The floors are concrete. The ceilings and trusses are lined with recent corrugated metal sheets, which are not of heritage significance.

The first floor classrooms are separated by narrow former preparation rooms which directly access classrooms. Partitions and the verandah ceiling are lined with flat sheets. A suspended celling has been installed in the first floor rooms, which is not of state-level heritage significance.

Features of state-level heritage significance also include:

- ground floor metal-framed chain mesh doors with timber frames
- toilet cubicle partitions with associated cubicle doors
- perimeter seats in changerooms
- timber shelves in janitor room
- concrete stairs with steel balustrade
- early door, window, and fanlight hardware
- small store under the west stair with a timber board door

=== Block F: Former plumbing workshop building (1963) ===
Block F is an intact one-storey brick veneer plumbing workshop building. It has a concrete slab floor and a steel portal frame. Its roof is clad with metal sheets and has an east facing clerestory window with metal-framed glass louvres. The eaves are lined with flat sheets. The end walls (north and south) are face brick with large double doors. The side walls (east and west) are extensively glazed with banks of steel-framed awning windows with louvre or fixed glass fanlights and crimped metal sheet-clad spandrel panel. A small gable-roofed block projects from the north elevation, accommodating a staffroom, a narrow pipe store room with door, and a materials store with double doors. Two extensions (c. 1978 and c 2001) have been added to the west side of the building. The windows along this side are mostly retained but are now internal.

The layout is intact, comprising two large workshops connected by a double door with glazing. The floors are concrete and walls are lined with flat sheets with D-shaped cover strips. The workshops' ceilings have been lined with corrugated metal sheet, which is not of state-level heritage significance. The workshops retain early timber-framed work benches.

== Heritage listing ==
Warwick State High School was listed on the Queensland Heritage Register on 28 June 2018 having satisfied the following criteria.

The place is important in demonstrating the evolution or pattern of Queensland's history.

Warwick State High School (opened on this site in 1914 as the Warwick Technical College and High School) is important in demonstrating the provision and evolution of state and technical education and its associated architecture in Queensland. It retains excellent, representative examples of government designs that were architectural responses to prevailing government educational philosophies.

Warwick State High School is an early example of a state funded education institution of regional importance, which has been at the forefront of the provision of secondary and technical education in Queensland, as demonstrated by Technical College and High School Buildings, Main Building, Block A (1915) and Workshops Block, Block B (1914); and Queensland's second purpose-built intermediate school building, Block C (1932).

Later high school buildings (South Connecting Wing 1958 and North Connecting Wing 1959, Block F 1963, and Block D 1968/9) are excellent representations of the continuum of years of experimentation with natural light, classroom size, and ventilation by the Department of Public Works (DPW) to produce an ideal educational environment.

The place is important in demonstrating the principal characteristics of a particular class of cultural places.

Warwick State High School is important in demonstrating the principal characteristics of a Queensland state high school and technical college complex developed from the early to the mid-20th century. The principal characteristics include: high quality, durable buildings designed by the DPW; separate buildings for specialist departments with subject-specific classrooms; classrooms and buildings for vocational education; classrooms with high levels of natural light and ventilation facilitated by open space around the buildings; separate toilet blocks/areas; and prominent gardens on the main street close to the centre of town.

Block A (1915), the Technical College and High School classroom building, demonstrates the principal characteristics of an early 20th century state technical college and high school teaching building in Queensland. It is highly intact retaining its: custom design in a confident classical style; landscaped front grounds and grand facade prominent on Palmerin Street; high quality materials and craftsmanship; a variety of classroom spaces designed for specialist classes; an attached separate toilet block.

Block B (1914), the Workshops Block, demonstrates the principal characteristics of an early 20th century state technical college and high school workshops building in Queensland. It is highly intact retaining its: restrained style and material use complementary to the main building; location standing separate from the main building to minimise noise disruption and dissipate heat from the forges and kiln; large open workshop spaces with minimal and durable internal finishes; large door access and gantry crane to the first floor; and kiln room (c. 1922) with chimney.

Block C (1932), the Intermediate School building, demonstrates the principal characteristics of a state intermediate school building from the interwar period in Queensland. It is highly intact retaining its: confident classical style with well-composed elevations; high quality materials and craftsmanship; a series of south-facing classrooms of a standard size with high levels of southern light and natural ventilation; and teachers rooms.

Block F (1963), the high school Plumbing Workshops building, demonstrates the principal characteristics of a state high school vocational training building from the mid-20th century in Queensland. It is highly intact retaining its: location standing separate from the main building to minimise noise disruption; brick veneer, concrete slab on ground, and steel portal frame construction with vented clerestory; large open workshop spaces with minimal and durable internal finishes; large door access; and high levels of natural light and ventilation.

The place is important because of its aesthetic significance.

Warwick State High School (Blocks A, B, C, and the North and South Connecting Wings) is highly intact and has external aesthetic significance for its beautiful attributes. This well composed complex of two-storey masonry buildings is unified by the harmonious form, scale, materials, and fine craftsmanship, laid out around an open courtyard setting with views between buildings. Blocks A and C have dominant roof fleches.

The DPW sought to convey a sense of progress and permanence through the designs, which provide a notable streetscape contribution to Palmerin and Victoria Streets.

The school is an important local landmark, highly visible within the townscape from surrounding vantage points, including views from the northern entry to the town and along Palmerin and Victoria Streets. Over many years Block A has been the subject of photographs showcasing the beautiful masonry buildings of Warwick.

The place has a strong or special association with a particular community or cultural group for social, cultural or spiritual reasons.

Schools and technical colleges have always played an important part in Queensland communities. They typically retain significant and enduring connections with former pupils, parents, and teachers; provide a venue for social interaction and volunteer work; and are a source of pride, symbolising local progress and aspirations.

Warwick State High School and its precursor institutions, have been at the forefront of technical and post-primary education in Queensland since 1895. Local fundraising supported the construction of the new purpose-built Technical College and High School (1914–15), boosting the importance of Warwick as an education centre for the southern downs region.

Warwick State High School has educated generations of students from Warwick and the surrounding districts for more than a century, and it remains a focus for the community, which continues its support of the school.

The place has a special association with the life or work of a particular person, group or organisation of importance in Queensland's history.

Warwick State High School has a special association the life work of nationally renowned and accomplished artist Charles Astley (1869–1929), who pioneered the teaching of pottery in Queensland technical colleges.

His close association with this school is the result of his employment as Art Master from 1908 to 1925. Astley is responsible for the carved sandstone emblem above the entrance to Block A, and the kiln room of Block B.
