= War of Southern Queensland =

1843–1855 conflict on the Australian frontier

- Part of Australian frontier wars
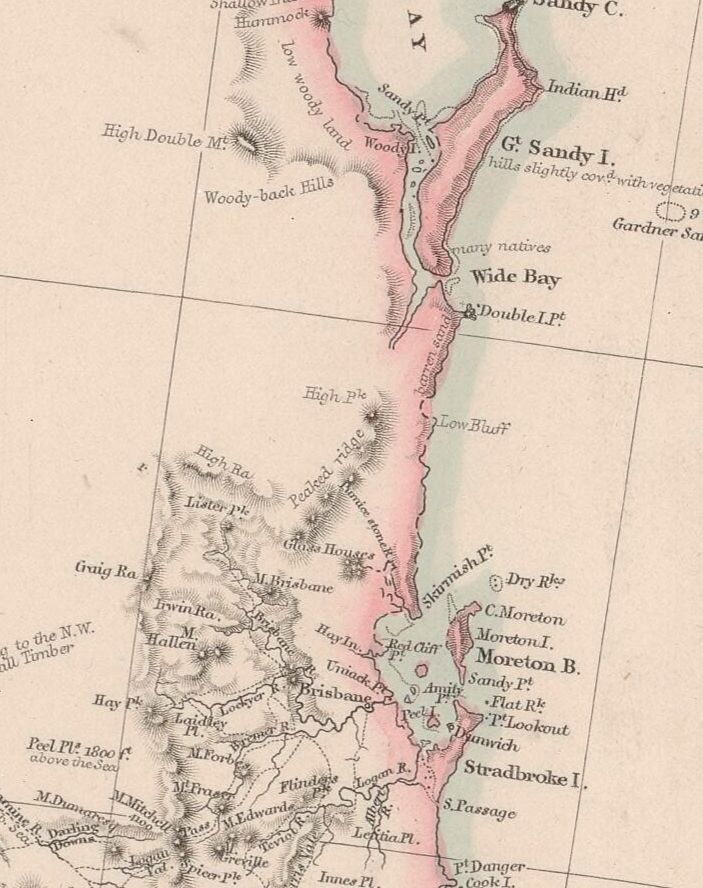
- Region of Southern Queensland; by John Arrowsmith 1841
Date	August–September 1843 – 5 January 1855
Location	South East Queensland and Wide Bay–Burnett, Eastern Australia
Result	Colonial victory; Indigenous resistance suppressed; Indigenous dispossession; Extensive loss of life.
Territorial changes	Consolidation of British colonial control over southern Queensland

Belligerents
(United Kingdom) British Empire • Colony of New South Wales	Indigenous confederation of south-east Queensland and Wide Bay-Burnett; 'United Tribes' •Jagera •Wakka Wakka •Kabi Kabi •Jinibara and allies.

Commanders and leaders
(United Kingdom) Queen Victoria (United Kingdom) Sir George Gipps (1843–1846) (United Kingdom) Sir Charles Augustus Fitzroy (1846–1855) (United Kingdom) Stephen Simpson (1842–1849)	Multuggerah; Dundalli; Old Moppy; Dalaipi; Yilbung; Daki-Yakka (Duke of York); Commandant; Billy Barlow and others

Strength
99th Regiment detachment (1842–1848) averaged 50–80 soldiers; • 11th Regiment detachment (1848-1854) averaged 60-80 soldiers Colonial militia, Native police, mounted police, and settlers	Several hundred warriors across allied tribal groups

Casualties and losses
Estimated death toll: 700 – 1000 (Kerkhove;2014-2020)	Estimated death toll: 1000 – 5000

The War of Southern Queensland (August–September 1843 – 5 January 1855) was a prolonged and widespread series of conflicts between the Indigenous peoples of South East Queensland and the southern parts of Wide Bay–Burnett, and British colonial settlers, militias, and police. The war began in the spring of 1843, following intertribal meetings held the previous year near to Baroon Pocket in the wake of the Kilcoy massacre. Leaders from the Jagera, Wakka Wakka, Kabi Kabi, and Jinibara nations formed a loose alliance sometimes described as the United Tribes. From this gathering came what historians later called the Bunya Declaration—a coordinated call for resistance and a stated intent to drive the British from their lands.

Historians regard the conflict as the largest and most sustained campaign of the Australian frontier wars, both in its geographic scope and duration, and had among the highest death tolls. The war led to the dispossession of Indigenous nations and consolidated colonial pastoral control across southern Queensland, continuing until the mid-1850s and culminating in the capture and public hanging of the resistance leader Dundalli in Brisbane in 1855, which largely ended organised Aboriginal resistance in the region.

== Background ==
European colonisation of the Brisbane region began with the establishment of the Moreton Bay penal settlement in 1824. The settlement disrupted Indigenous land use, blocked access to water and food, and introduced new diseases and social pressures. The Jagera and Quandamooka had already faced years of tension and conflict with the settlement, including raids on the maize fields and the Moreton Bay conflict between 1832 and 1833, in which Ngugi and Nunukul groups attacked penal outstations on the islands and mainland. These early clashes marked one of the first sustained episodes of Aboriginal resistance in Queensland and set the stage for later hostilities inland.

By the late 1830s, the opening of the Darling Downs to pastoralists triggered rapid expansion north from New South Wales. The combination of dispossession, sexual violence, and epidemic disease caused severe population decline among the Moreton Bay clans. Missionary reports by Christopher Eipper and J.C.S. Handt in 1841 described the collapse of traditional life through venereal disease, malnutrition, and infanticide resulting from social breakdown.

One of the principal causes of their decrease is the diseases to which they are subject, and particularly that which providence has ordained to be the scourge of excess and debauchery and from which even the children are not exempted [venereal disease]. Some of them have died of consumption and dropsy. Another principal cause in their decrease is the prostitution of their wives to Europeans. This base intercourse not only retards the procreation of their own race; but it almost always tends to the destruction of the offspring ... for they generally kill the half-caste children as soon as they are born. The number of Children is consequently very small ….

— J.C.S. Handt

== Prelude to war ==
=== Kilcoy massacre ===
In early 1842, conflict intensified after the poisoning of Indigenous people at Kilcoy Station, where between 50 and 60 members of the Gubbi Gubbi and neighbouring groups died after consuming flour laced with strychnine. News of the killings spread quickly across south-east Queensland, carried by Aboriginal messengers and later confirmed by station records and missionary reports. The event produced widespread anger through the region and became one of the principal catalysts for intertribal discussions on retaliation and coordinated resistance.

In the months following the Kilcoy massacre, reports of unrest spread across the Moreton Bay district. Commissioner for Crown Lands Stephen Simpson warned Governor Sir George Gipps in May 1842 that the killings had "excited much agitation among the native tribes," enclosing statements from long-term Indigenous-language intermediaries James Davis ("Duramboi") and David Bracewell ("Wandi"), who reported that many groups were discussing retaliation and resisting further encroachment.

=== Great Toor of 1842 ===
During late 1842, a large intertribal gathering—later remembered as a toor—was held at Baroon Pocket in the bunya country of the Blackall Range. Missionary observers, including Karl Wilhelm Schmidt and Christopher Eipper, recorded that news of the Kilcoy poisonings had "spread through all the neighbouring tribes" and that the gathering was marked by unusual political discussion and agitation. Leaders exchanged accounts of settler violence, expressed anger over the deaths at Kilcoy, and discussed the possibility of coordinated retaliation and the defence of their lands.

A central figure in these deliberations was Old Moppy (Ugarapul), whose authority extended across the Upper Brisbane and Lockyer districts. Contemporary settler sources described him as a major organiser capable of rallying several hundred warriors and as a headman actively working to build broader alliances among neighbouring groups.

=== Rising unrest (late-1842 to mid-1843) ===
In late 1842 or early 1843, conflict in the Upper Brisbane and Lockyer districts intensified following a major settler raid on Old Moppy's camp. Contemporary retrospective accounts describe a party of 35–50 settlers attacking the camp, killing several people including Old Moppy's eldest son, Wooinambi. Soon afterwards, Old Moppy himself was killed in a separate surprise attack while fishing at Blackfellows Creek (Tent Hill), an event dated by historians to c. 1842–43 and widely understood as a reprisal by local colonists.

With Old Moppy's death, tensions across the region escalated further. By early to mid-1843, stations along the Upper Brisbane, Stanley River, Lockyer, and parts of the D’Aguilar Range were reporting increasing hostility, including the driving off of stock, burning of grass around outstations, and threats to shepherds and hut-keepers. Several contemporary settler accounts indicate that isolated huts and small homesteads were temporarily abandoned, reflecting a growing fear that a coordinated attack was imminent.

=== Warnings and mobilisation ===
During the winter of 1843, further large gatherings occurred in the bunya region as anger over Kilcoy continued to spread. Contemporary settler observers, including Tom Petrie and Henry Stuart Russell, later recalled encountering a large and organised Indigenous force assembled in the region. A prominent figure in this mobilisation was Dundalli, a Dalla–Gubbi Gubbi lawman whose authority increased in the early 1840s; Petrie identified him as one of the principal organisers among the groups of the Pine Rivers, Caboolture, and Bunya districts. Both men stated that they were instructed to warn Brisbane that reprisals would follow for the Kilcoy poisonings, and that a unified resistance was being organised. Missionary reports from the same period, including that of Carl Wilhelm Schmidt, noted that the poisonings had "agitated" neighbouring groups and that many were preparing for renewed hostilities. Later historians have referred to this coordinated warning as the "Bunya Declaration", not a contemporary term but a historiographical label used to describe the moment when several groups appear to have agreed upon a common strategy of resistance.

By August 1843—the point at which Tom Petrie and Henry Stuart Russell encountered the large intertribal alliance in the Bunya country—colonial officials and settlers were reporting signs of a coordinated Aboriginal campaign across the Brisbane Valley, Lockyer, and Darling Downs.

Pugh's Almanac (1869) recalled 1843 as "when the blacks were now beginning to be very troublesome", and travel writer Nehemiah Bartley later summarised:

Many a pretty bush station, where ladies in muslin and silks now dwell ... has its humble mound neatly fenced, where sleeps the stockman or shepherd untimely slain by boomerang, spear or tomahawk, between '43 and '55.

— Nehemiah Bartley (1896), Australian Pioneers and Reminiscences p. 167

== War fronts ==
=== Upper Brisbane–Lockyer campaign (1843–1846) ===
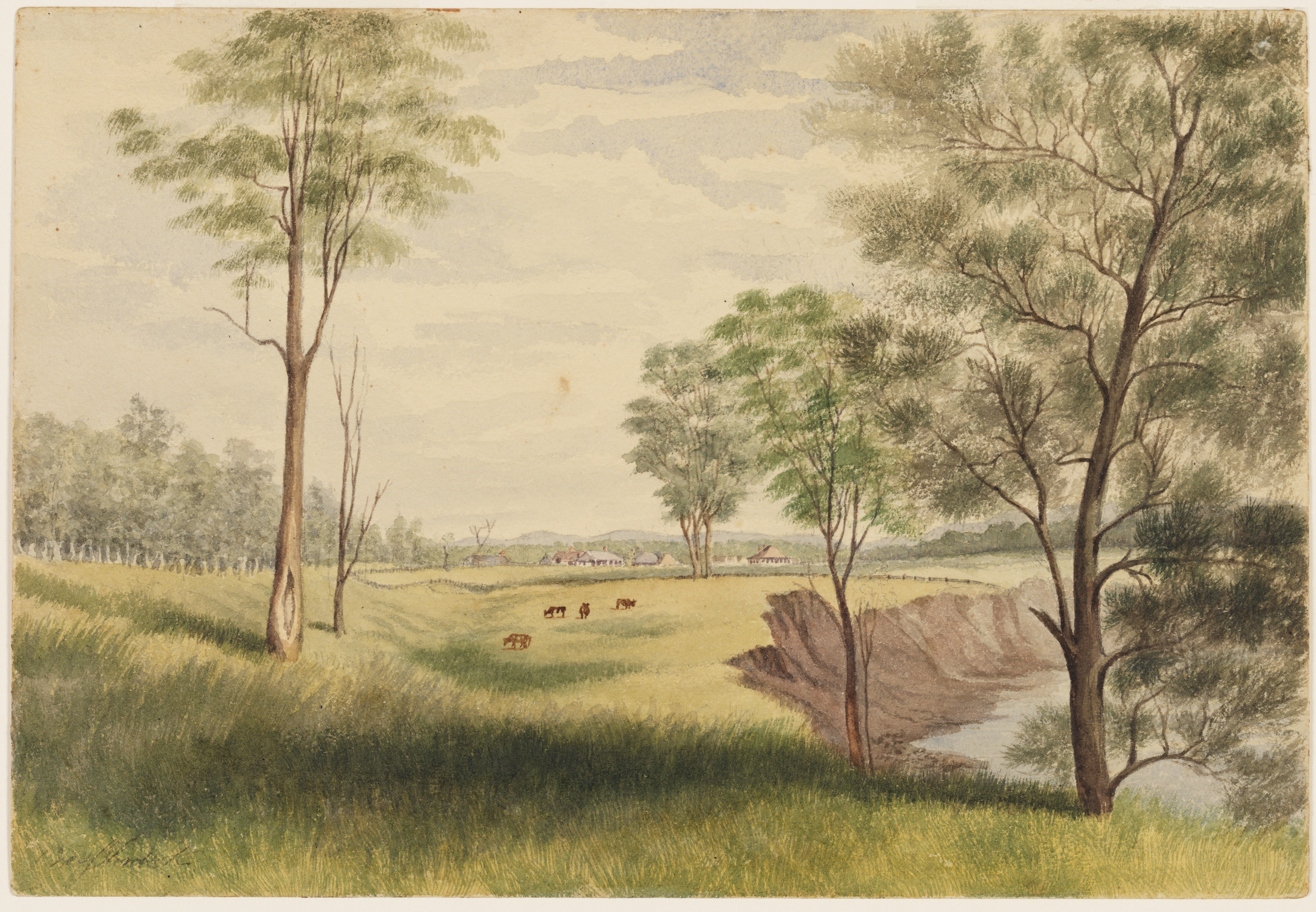
Cressbrook Homestead c.1852–1853; was one of many stations attacked during the Upper Brisbane–Lockyer campaign between 1843 and 1846

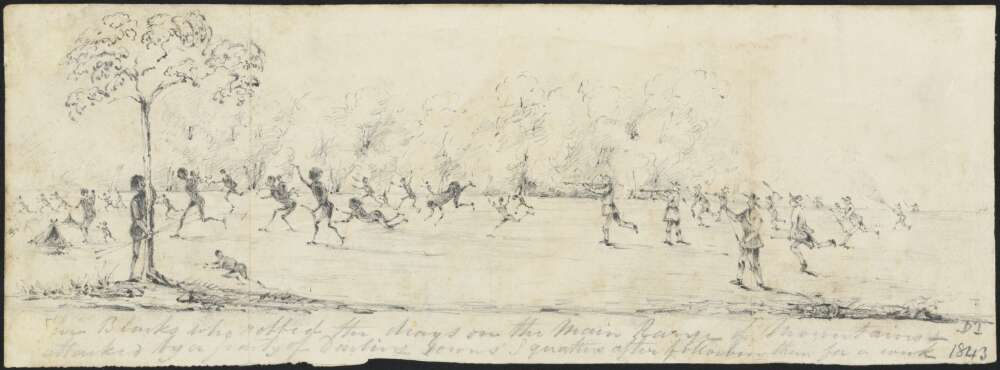
Squatters attack on an Indigenous camp c.1843; Likely a scene of the 'Storming of the Rosewood'.

The first major theatre opened in 1843 when Multuggerah, the son of Old Moppy, led coordinated ambushes along dray routes crossing the Great Dividing Range. On 12 September 1843, their forces attacked supply convoys in the Battle of One Tree Hill near Toowoomba, halting traffic between the Darling Downs and the coast and forcing settlers to abandon the range route.

After the battle, Multuggerah's forces withdrew to the Rosewood Scrub, from which they continued to raid and besiege outlying stations for three years. Settlers constructed a small redoubt at Rosewood Homestead, reportedly manned in shifts by local volunteers. In 1846 a large colonial force of settlers and police attacked the stronghold in what was called the Storming of the Rosewood, killing Multuggerah and many of his followers.

To secure the range route, in late 1843 Stephen Simpson ordered the 99th Regiment to establish Fort Helidon; it was a military barracks and stone redoubt on the road linking Ipswich and the Darling Downs. It became the first permanent inland military post in Queensland and remained active until the end of the war.

By the mid-1840s, many of the United Tribes in the Brisbane and Lockyer valleys had acquired small numbers of working muskets or fowling pieces, though ammunition was limited. Aboriginal people in the Brisbane and Lockyer districts obtained these firearms mainly through trade and theft: drays and stockmen's huts were raided for old muskets, and some convicts or sawyers illegally bartered powder and shot for food or labour.

From 1843 to 1848 the upper Brisbane Valley was a stronghold of Aboriginal resistance. Raids at Wivenhoe, Rosewood, and along the Stanley River targeted isolated huts and supply lines. Following Multuggerah's death, leadership passed to figures such as Dundalli and Jackey, who continued coordinated operations from the Blackall Ranges and Bunya country.

=== York's Hollow campaign (1846–1848) ===
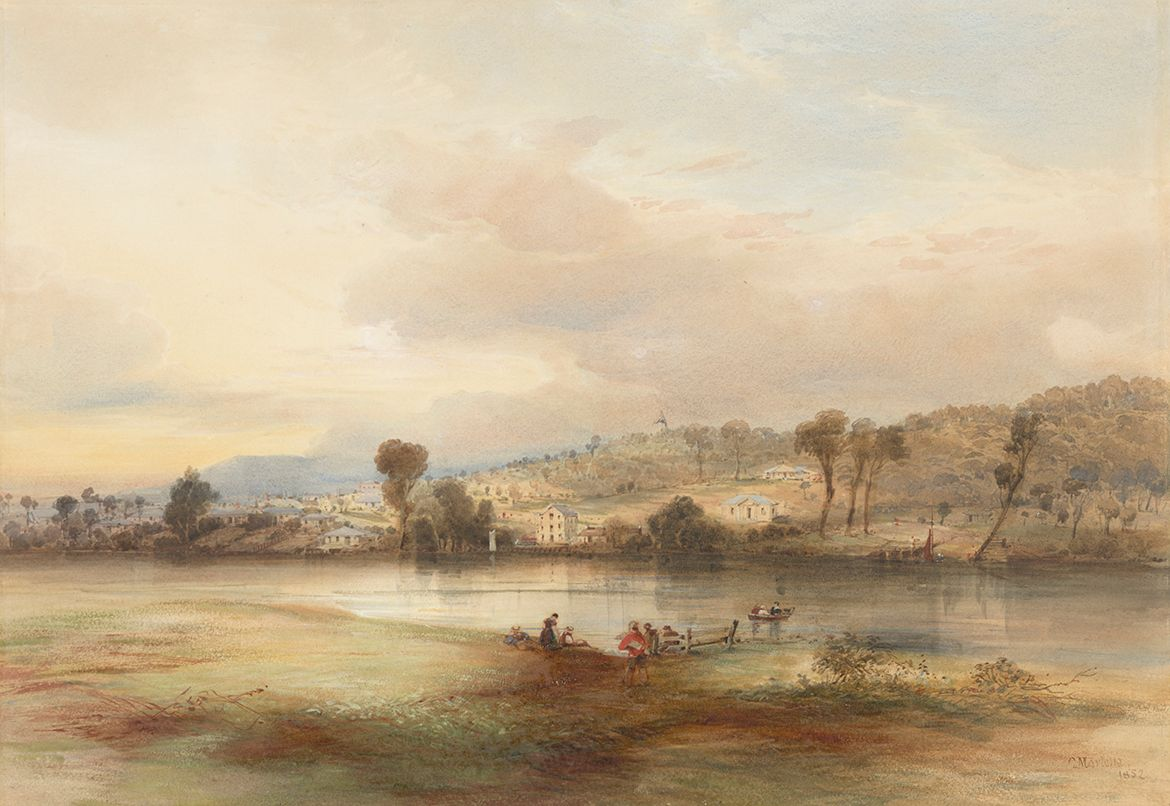
Brisbane c.1852; Over Spring Hill (right) was the semi-permanent Turrbal encampment of Barrambin or York's Hollow

York's Hollow was a series of lagoons north of early Brisbane, between today's Spring Hill and Herston. It served as the primary Indigenous settlement of the Turrbal and Jagera tribes and a regional meeting ground for visitors from the Logan–Albert, D’Aguilar, and Darling Downs districts.

By the mid-1840s, refugees from the Upper Brisbane–Lockyer had fled to York's Hollow raising its population upwards of one to two hundred. The concentration of people, combined with shortages of rations and conflict over employment and women, led to friction with the growing settlement of Brisbane. According to Professor Ray Kerkhove of the University of Queensland, the York's Hollow campaign was a series of raids and attacks between York's Hollow and Brisbane, at its greatest intensity between 1846 and 1848, and represents the worst extent of organised violence within the Brisbane district during the war.

After robberies near Bowen Bridge Road and Breakfast Creek, in July 1846, Mounted Police under Lt George Fulford and a detachment of the 99th Regiment of Foot attacked the camp by surrounding the Hollow and firing upon it. The combined force surrounded the site for several days, maintaining a cordon and firing intermittently into the camp before burning several huts. Contemporary reports described the engagement as "a bold and decisive movement against the blacks infesting the Hollow," noting that many residents were captured or driven off, while their leader, known to settlers as the Duke of York escaped into the surrounding scrub.

Some Aboriginal defenders were reportedly armed with muskets or fowling pieces, weapons that had become available through trade and theft during the preceding decade, and returned fire during the siege Later settler accounts referred to this engagement as the "siege of the Duke of York’s camp," describing it as a multi-day affair that effectively broke the strength of the community. Historian Ray Kerkhove identifies this 1846 operation as the principal "siege" of the York's Hollow Campaign, the most sustained single engagement between Aboriginal groups and colonial forces in the Brisbane district during the 1840s. Several huts were burned and a number of residents wounded or captured.

Within a few months the camp was rebuilt. After further dray robberies, the Mounted Police launched a second raid in 1847, attacking and burning huts and shelters. Rod Fisher describes "successive police raids on York's Hollow between 1846 and 1848", noting that each time the inhabitants returned.

By 1848, the 11th Regiment of Foot had replaced the 99th as Brisbane's garrison. A combined military-police operation burned what remained of the Hollow and drove the inhabitants north-east toward Breakfast Creek, Nundah, and Eagle Farm.

=== Wide Bay, Mary River and northern districts ===
The northern runs around Wide Bay and the Mary River were heavily contested. Repeated attacks by Kabi Kabi and Badtjala warriors between 1847 and 1852 forced the abandonment of many pastoral runs, including parts of Widgee, Woolooga, and the Upper Mary.

=== Final engagements and aftermath ===
By 1853–54 fighting contracted around Brisbane. Raids at Nundah and Breakfast Creek, coupled with killings attributed by the command of Dundalli, prompted a major police operation. Dundalli was captured and executed publicly on 5 January 1855 outside the present-day General Post office, in front of several thousand spectators. Although this is often cited as the end of the war, sporadic reprisals and punitive patrols continued across southern Queensland until 1859.

== Historiography and casualties ==
Scholars including Raymond Evans, Henry Reynolds, Jonathan Richards, Timothy Bottoms, and Ray Kerkhove identify the southern Queensland frontier as one of the bloodiest in Australia.

Historian Ray Kerkhove characterises the War of Southern Queensland (1843–1855) as a "regional war of resistance" conducted through coordinated inter-tribal alliances and guerrilla tactics targeting outstations, stock routes, and settlements. Based on surviving colonial reports and official returns, Kerkhove estimated that at least 174 European settlers, soldiers, and police were confirmed killed during the conflict. In later assessments, Kerkhove revised the likely total upward, suggesting that as many as 700–800 Europeans may have died when unrecorded or unreported incidents are included, and in some later commentary estimating that the true toll may have approached 1,000. He also estimated that at least 1,000 Aboriginal people were killed during the conflict, though the true number was likely far higher due to widespread under-reporting and unrecorded punitive expeditions.

Historians estimate that between 1,000 and 5,000 Indigenous people were killed during the War of Southern Queensland (1843–1855), based on comparative analyses by Kerkhove (2014), Ørsted-Jensen (2011), Evans (2010), and Reynolds (2013).
