= Upper Brisbane–Lockyer campaign =

- Part of War of Southern Queensland
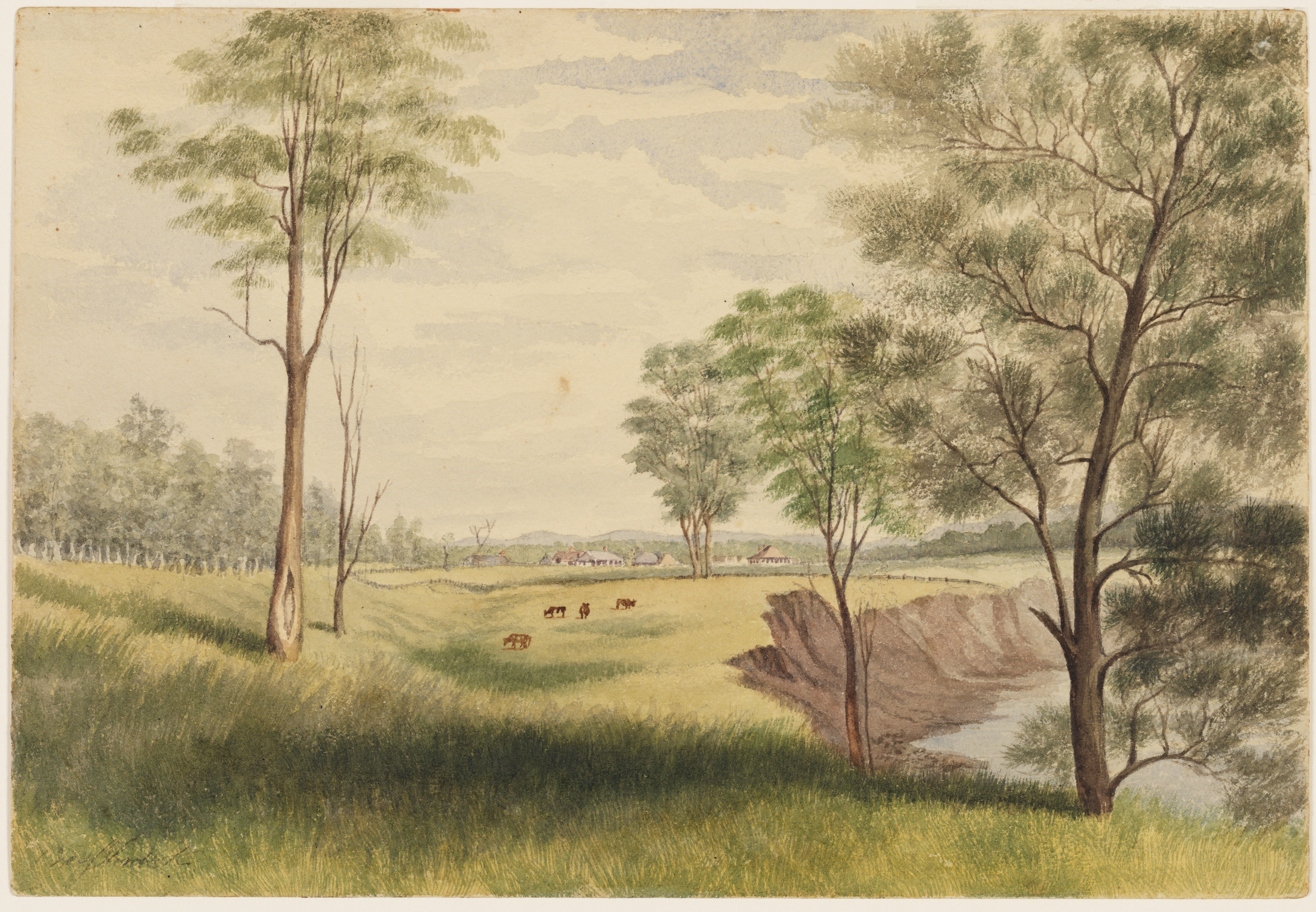
- Cressbrook Homestead c.1852-1853 was one of many stations attacked during the Upper Brisbane–Lockyer campaign
Date	c. 1843–1846
Location	Upper Brisbane River and Lockyer Valley, south-east Queensland
Result	Colonial victory; Aboriginal resistance suppressed inland

Belligerents
United Tribes • Jagera, • Dalla, • Wakka Wakka, • Yuggera, • Giabal	(United Kingdom) British Empire • Colony of New South Wales: 99th Regiment; Mounted Police of Moreton Bay; Settlers and stockmen; Native Police (from 1846)

Commanders and leaders
Multuggerah	Stephen Simpson; local police and settlers

Strength
250-350 warriors	Military, Mounted patrols and settler militias

Casualties and losses
Unknown (heavy)	Minimal recorded

The Upper Brisbane–Lockyer campaign (1843–1846) was the western phase of the War of Southern Queensland, a sequence of frontier conflicts between Aboriginal confederations and British colonists in what is now south-east Queensland, Australia. Centred on the upper Brisbane River and Lockyer Valley areas, from Cressbrook and Colinton stations to Tarampa, Gatton and the Toowoomba Range, and it was led by the Jagera warrior and headman Multuggerah. The campaign included the Battle of One Tree Hill in September 1843, one of the best-documented Aboriginal victories of the Australian frontier wars.

== Background ==
The Brisbane Valley was opened to free settlement in 1842, and large pastoral runs such as Cressbrook, Colinton and Glen Esk were established on Jagera and Dalla country. That same year the Kilcoy massacre killed dozens of Aboriginal visitors, triggering widespread reprisals. By 1843 Aboriginal groups had begun attacking drays and shepherds along the routes between Ipswich and the Darling Downs.

== Course of the campaign ==
In late 1842 Multuggerah whose father, the elder leader Old Moppy, had recently been killed by settlers, began directing raids around Helidon and Cressbrook. He warned squatter John “Tinker” Campbell that “it was to be war now in earnest,” intending to close the dray roads, starve out settlers and drive stock from the Lockyer Valley. Between 1 and 11 September 1843 his forces blockaded runs across the valley and attacked convoys moving between Ipswich and the Darling Downs.

On 12 September 1843 a party of eighteen armed men with three bullock drays attempted to force a passage through the Toowoomba Range. Multuggerah's warriors, numbering over one hundred, ambushed them by felling logs across the road, seizing supplies and stampeding the bullocks. A retaliatory settler force of about one hundred men under Crown Lands Commissioner Stephen Simpson then advanced into the Helidon and Rosewood districts, but was repelled in the ensuing Battle of One Tree Hill. Aboriginal fighters rained boulders down on the settlers from the escarpment, forcing their retreat.

A counter-offensive led by Simpson between 13 and 30 September 1843 swept through Helidon, Laidley and Tarampa. Several skirmishes occurred, including a dawn attack on Multuggerah's camp at Rosewood Scrub. Despite these assaults, Multuggerah's men ambushed another settler group at the McDougall brothers’ station in early October, fighting a two-hour engagement that ended in another United Tribes victory.

In late 1843, Stephen Simpson authorised the construction of a military barracks at Helidon, often referred to as Fort Helidon. Its structure was a stone and earth redoubt near the main dray road linking Ipswich with the Darling Downs. The post was manned by detachments of the British 99th Regiment, as well as local Mounted Police, serving as a patrol base and refuge for travellers.

By the mid-1840s, many of the United Tribes in the Brisbane and Lockyer valleys had acquired small numbers of working muskets or fowling pieces, though ammunition was limited. Aboriginal people in the Brisbane and Lockyer districts obtained these firearms mainly through trade and theft: drays and stockmen’s huts were raided for old muskets, and some convicts or sawyers illegally bartered powder and shot for food or labour.

By 1844 some Aboriginal groups on the Darling Downs sought peace, but Multuggerah continued a policy of economic warfare — driving off sheep and cattle “with the greatest coolness” and besieging out-stations along the upper Brisbane River. His warriors operated from the ridges of One Tree Hill, Rosewood Scrub and Helidon, repeatedly cutting communication routes.

In 1846, during a renewed series of raids near Rosewood Scrub station, Multuggerah was killed after settlers stormed his camp. His death marked the effective end of organised Aboriginal resistance in the upper Brisbane and Lockyer districts.

== Leadership and tactics ==
Multuggerah (also known as Young Moppy, King Moppy and Campbell) was born in the early 1820s and belonged to the Jagera and allied language groups occupying the Lockyer Valley and upper Brisbane regions. He forged an alliance of Jagera, Dalla, Waka Waka and Giabal peoples, known in colonial sources as the “Mountain Tribes”, and led a disciplined guerrilla campaign using ambushes, road blockades and strategic retreats. His tactics aimed to deny settlers access to stock routes and food supplies. Colonial counter-measures included mounted patrols, mass “dispersals,” and the establishment of a police barracks at Helidon.

Historian Ray Kerkhove estimates that Multuggerah's confederation comprised about 250 to 350 fighting men, drawn from the Jagera, Dalla, Wakka Wakka, Giabal and Yuggera groups.

== Outcome ==
By late 1846 colonial control had been consolidated across the Upper Brisbane and Lockyer valleys. Surviving resistance groups withdrew north toward Kilcoy and the Mary River, leading into the later Brisbane campaign (1846–1849) and the Sandgate campaign (1849–1850). The inland fighting left dozens of Aboriginal people dead and marked a decisive phase in the European conquest of southern Queensland.

== Historiography ==
Ray Kerkhove of the University of Queensland, identifies the Upper Brisbane–Lockyer fighting as running from about 1843 to 1846. In The Battle of One Tree Hill (2013) he and Frank Uhr describe the conflict as an organised Aboriginal effort “to close the roads” and “starve out” settlers. Historian Jonathan Richards documents Native Police operations in the same region during 1844–46, confirming the scale of reprisals. Nineteenth-century recollections by Henry Stuart Russell also mention attacks on Cressbrook huts and Lockyer stations during 1842–43.

The campaign represents the largest inland Aboriginal resistance effort in south-east Queensland prior to the full establishment of the Native Police. It demonstrated inter-tribal coordination under named leadership and formed the strategic bridge between the inland victory at Meewah and the later Brisbane and coastal conflicts.

== See also ==
- War of Southern Queensland
- Australian Frontier Wars
