= Battle of One Tree Hill =

1843 conflict in Queensland, Australia

- Part of Upper Brisbane–Lockyer campaign, War of Southern Queensland
Date	12 September 1843
Location	Tabletop Mountain (then known as "One Tree Hill"), Darling Downs, Queensland, Australia.
Result	Ugarapul victory

Belligerents
(British Empire) British colonists	Ugarapul people

Commanders and leaders
Commissioner Stephen Simpson	Multuggerah

Strength
18 (35–50 reinforcements for counterattack)	Over 100

Casualties and losses
Unknown, mostly wounded	Unknown, a couple killed and wounded

The Battle of One Tree Hill was a major engagement during the Upper Brisbane–Lockyer campaign, that took place between European settlers and a war band of the Ugarapul and other Aboriginal groups in the Darling Downs area in the Colony of New South Wales in the 1840s, as part of the Australian frontier wars. It was one in which the settlers were routed by a group of local Aboriginal men under the warrior Multuggerah, a rare event both in its form, as pitched battles between the two groups, and in its outcome.

== Background ==
Moreton Bay was somewhat settled prior to the battle, due to a penal settlement having been established in 1824. The colonisers had some contact with the local Aboriginal groups but not the Ugarapuls tribe who mounted the uprising against the invaders. The little interaction that the Ugarapul's had had with the settlers involved harbouring escaped convict, James Sterry Baker. From most accounts, Multuggerah, the leader of the Frontier Warriors he was of the Ugarapul tribe of the Yuggera Language Nation in the 1830s and 1840s, was happy as long as the settlers didn't encroach into the Lockyer Valley.

However, by 1842 there were attempts to occupy land in and near the Lockyer Valley, Darling Downs and upper Brisbane areas. These were met with resistance from the local alliance of "mountain tribes" united under Multuggerah, a warrior, strategist and diplomat. After the 1842 deliberate poisoning of 50 or 60 Aboriginal people on Kilcoy Station, the resistance gathered momentum, and an uprising was planned. Old Moppy, Multuggerah and his men began ambushing the mountain road that was the only route for bringing supplies from Brisbane to the Downs. The road had been built about two years earlier and was the only way of keeping both commerce and communication open between the Moreton Bay and Downs areas. Multuggerah and his forces planned to deprive the squatters of their supplies.

== The battles ==
=== Ambush ===
In September 1843, a large group of squatters organised a "cavalcade" consisting of 18 armed men and three drays pulled by about 50 bullocks. At a location known as One Tree Hill, (now known as Tabletop Mountain, Queensland), near Toowoomba, the group was ambushed by Multuggerah and about 100 men, having been forced to stop at barricades previously erected by the attackers. The squatters fled back to Bonifant's Inn, their starting point for that trip, about 34 kilometres (21 mi) away. The warriors held a corroborree after sacking the drays, feasting on bullock meat.

=== Retaliation attempt ===
The squatters organised a revenge party, comprising all of the men at the Inn, including servants, numbering between 35 and 50 men. At nightfall on 12 September they arrived near what was left of the drays, and camped about 2 kilometres (1.2 mi) from Mt Tabletop. They managed to surprise the group of Aboriginal people by arriving at their camp very early the next morning, and the two groups engaged in a full-on battle. Quite a number of Aboriginal people were wounded or killed, but the settlers were hindered by getting bogged in the mud, and one was wounded in the buttocks with a spear thrown by a woman. The majority of the remaining warriors staged a retreat up the steep slopes of the mountain, where they had stored heaps of boulders. They were then able to throw spears and stones and roll boulders down the slopes, wounding some of the squatters and shattering many of their muskets, until they were forced to retreat.

The squatters awaited the border police of Dr Stephen Simpson, the Crown land commissioner for Moreton Bay, but when the six men found the road barricaded again, decided not to attempt an attack on the warriors.

=== Aftermath ===
Following this defeat, there was an unusually large-scale response to the Battle of One Tree Hill. A campaign began to remove Multuggerah’s warriors out of the area, headed by Dr Simpson and commissioner of Crown Lands in the Darling Downs, Christopher Rolleston. Dr Simpson gathered forces from Brisbane and Ipswich until he had a total of 35–45 men. The 16 station owners and overseers sent out a call, gathering 40 to 60 men. Eventually, about 75 to 100 settlers, including most of Moreton Bay’s police and 11 soldiers (including 1 officer) from the 99th (Lanarkshire) Regiment of Foot, chased the warriors from the pass. Many were killed in the Lockyer Valley area.

Conflicts continued as the warriors camped in the Rosewood Scrub and Helidon Scrub areas and mounted raids on the settlers. In October 1843, using an Aboriginal tracker, the squatters found and stormed the camp, killing leaders (although apparently not Multuggerah) and many others. In the same month, as a measure to ensure that a similar incidents are not repeated, a six-man military detachment was stationed at Helidon to escort the drays through the gorge. Attacks and raids in the area continued for another five years.

== Legacy and memorials ==
A monument recording the battle was established in 2005.

An Indigenous land use agreement was signed over the site, between Toowoomba City Council and a body representing the Ugarapul people as the traditional owners of the area, in 2008.

In 2010, the National Library of Australia acquired a sketch by local Thomas John Domville Taylor (the origin of the name Domville for the locality and mountain near Millmerran) for A$120,000 which is believed to be an eyewitness account of the aftermath of the battle. It depicts "11 squatters firing on a group of 25 Indigenous people of whom three appear to have been shot".
