= Commodore Mine =

Commodore Mine may refer to:

- Commodore Mine: Thermal black coal mine in Queensland, Australia
- Commodore Mine: Silver, lead, and zinc (primary products extracted) mine in Colorado, United States
- Commodore Mine: 2014 book by Alan Mehrer (ISBN 978-1625260628)
