= George William Paty =

British Army general

General Sir George William Paty KCB KH
- Born: 1788; Bristol, UK
- Died: 8 May 1868 (aged 79–80); London
- Military career
- Allegiance: (United Kingdom) Great Britain
- Service years: 1804–1841
- Rank: General
- Conflicts: Napoleonic Wars; Copenhagen Expedition; Peninsular War
- Awards: KCB, KH

General Sir George William Paty KCB KH (1788 – 8 May 1868) was a senior British Army officer.

He was born the son of William Paty of Bristol and joined the British Army in 1804 as an ensign in the 32nd Foot. He was promoted to lieutenant the following year and took part in the Copenhagen Expedition of 1807.

Promoted to captain in 1808, he served in the Peninsular War from 1811 to 1814, attached towards the end to the Portuguese Army. He was present at the Siege of Badajoz, the Battle of Salamanca, the retreat from Madrid to Burgos and the Battles of Vittoria, the Pyrenees, Nivelle and Nive. He received the silver war medal with six clasps and was honoured by the Portuguese by being made a Commander of the Order of Aviz and a Knight of the Order of the Tower and Sword. He was promoted to major in 1814 and placed on half-pay in late 1816.

In June 1826 he was advanced to lieutenant-colonel on full pay in the 94th Foot, becoming a colonel of the Army in 1837. He was made a Knight of the Royal Guelphic Order (KH) in 1832 and a CB in 1838.

He retired in 1841, was promoted to major-general in 1846 and to lieutenant-colonel in 1854, in which year he was appointed colonel for life of the 70th Regiment of Foot. He was made KCB in 1861 and made full general on 14 March 1862.

He died at his London home in 1868 and was buried in Kensal Green Cemetery.

Military offices
Preceded by Gage John Hall	Colonel of the 70th (Surrey) Regiment of Foot; 1854–1868	Succeeded by Charles Hastings Doyle
