= Battle of Badajoz =

The Battle of Badajoz may refer to:

- Battle of Badajoz (1812), during the Peninsular War
- Battle of Badajoz (1936), during the Spanish Civil War

== See also ==
- Siege of Badajoz (disambiguation)
