= Domville, Queensland =

Domville
- Suburb
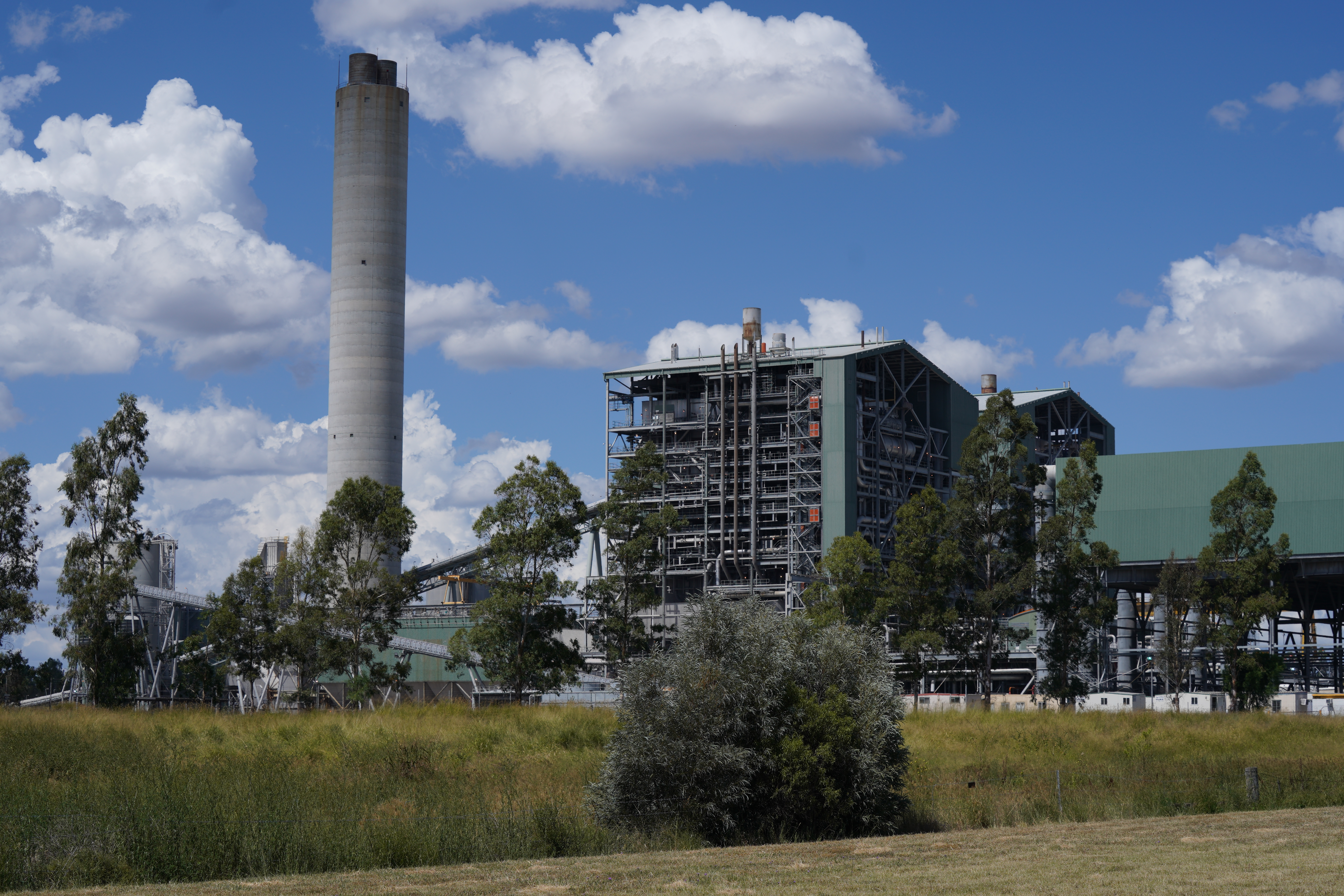
- Millmerran Power Station, 2022

- Interactive map of Domville
- Coordinates: 27.9361°S 151.2805°E
- Country: Australia
- State: Queensland
- LGA: Toowoomba Region
- Location: 17.3 km (10.7 mi) S of Millmerran; 59.1 km (36.7 mi) SW of Pittsworth; 97.5 km (60.6 mi) SW of Toowoomba CBD; 230 km (140 mi) WSW of Brisbane

Government
  - State electorate: Southern Downs
  - Federal division: Maranoa

Area
  - Total: 26.3 km^{2} (10.2 sq mi)

Population
  - Total: 0 (2021 census)
  - Density: 0.000/km^{2} (0.00/sq mi)
- Time zone: UTC+10:00 (AEST)
- Postcode: 4357
Suburbs around Domville
Millmerran	Millmerran	Millmerran
Clontarf	Domville	Millmerran
Clontarf	Grays Gate	Grays Gate

Domville is a rural locality in the Toowoomba Region, Queensland, Australia. In the 2021 census, Domville had "no people or a very low population".

== Geography ==
Domville is about 6.6 kilometres (4.1 mi) south of Millmerran. The Millmerran–Inglewood Road (State Route 82) forms the north-western boundary.

The north and eastern part of the locality is farmland with the Commodore Mine (27.9366°S 151.2614°E) in the south-west of the locality extending into neighbouring Clontarf.

Immediately adjacent to the coal mine is the coal-fired Millmerran Power Station in the south of the locality (27.9569°S 151.2799°E). A conveyor belt carries cola from the mine to the power station.

Domville is part of the Balonne-Condamine drainage basin.

== History ==
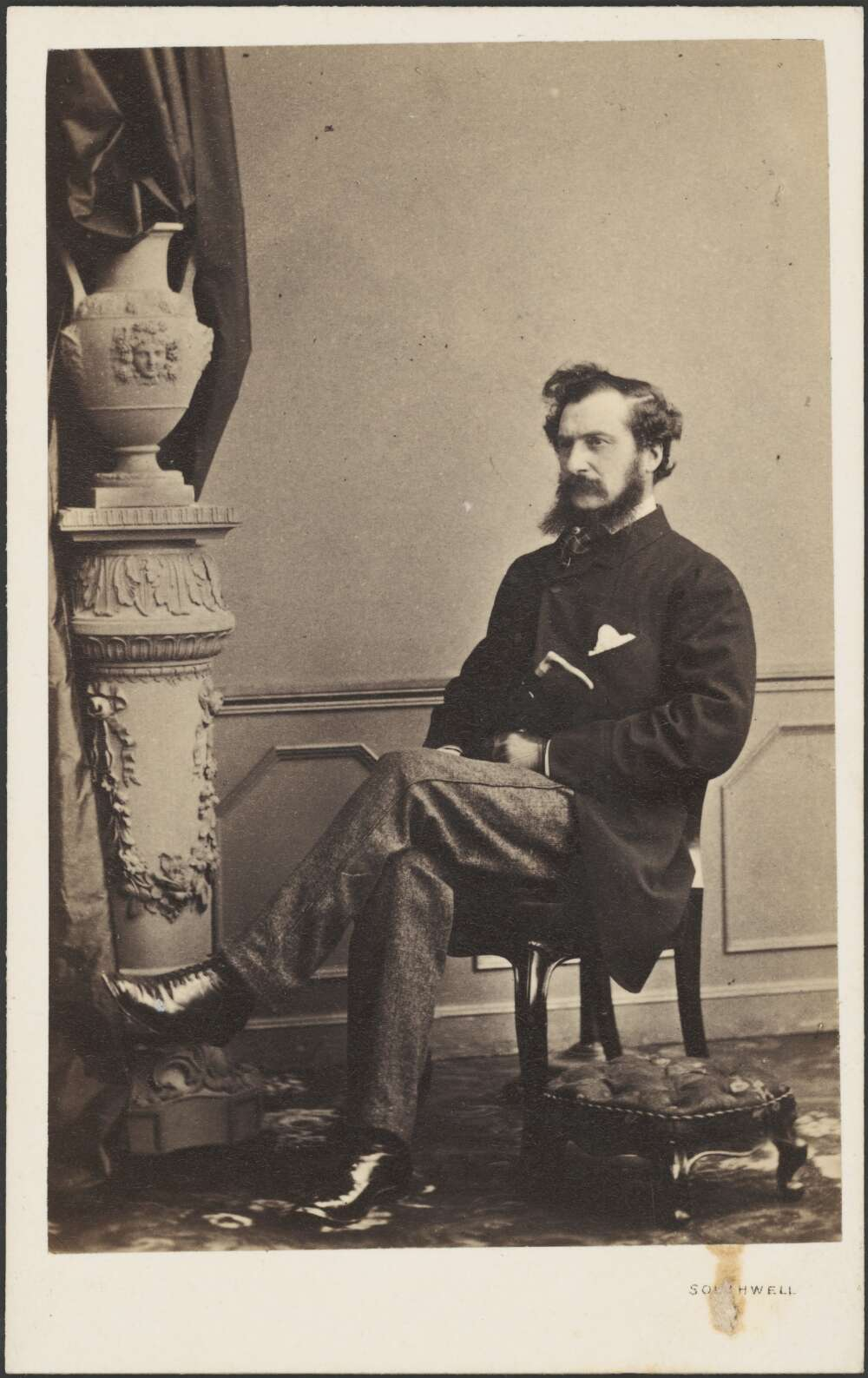
Thomas Domville Taylor, circa 1862

Domville's name is from Thomas John Domville Taylor (c.1817-1889), whose sketch of Mount Domville is held by the National Library of Australia. He was also the artist of a rare sketch showing an historic event, the 1843 Battle of One Tree Hill.

Millmerran was known as Domville for five years between 1 June 1889 and 16 November 1894.

Domville Provisional School opened on 25 January 1897. It closed and then reopened in 1903 and again in 1905 and closed finally in June 1907.

A second Domville Provisional School opened on 14 May 1923 at a different location to the first school. It became Domville State School in 1930. It closed in 1954.

== Demographics ==
In the 2016 census, Domville had "no people or a very low population".

In the 2021 census, Domville had "no people or a very low population".

== Education ==
There are no schools in Domville. The nearest government primary and secondary school (to Year 10) is Millmerran State School in neighbouring Millmerran to the north. The nearest government secondary school to Year 12 is Pittsworth State High School in Pittsworth to the north-west.
