= Wolston House =

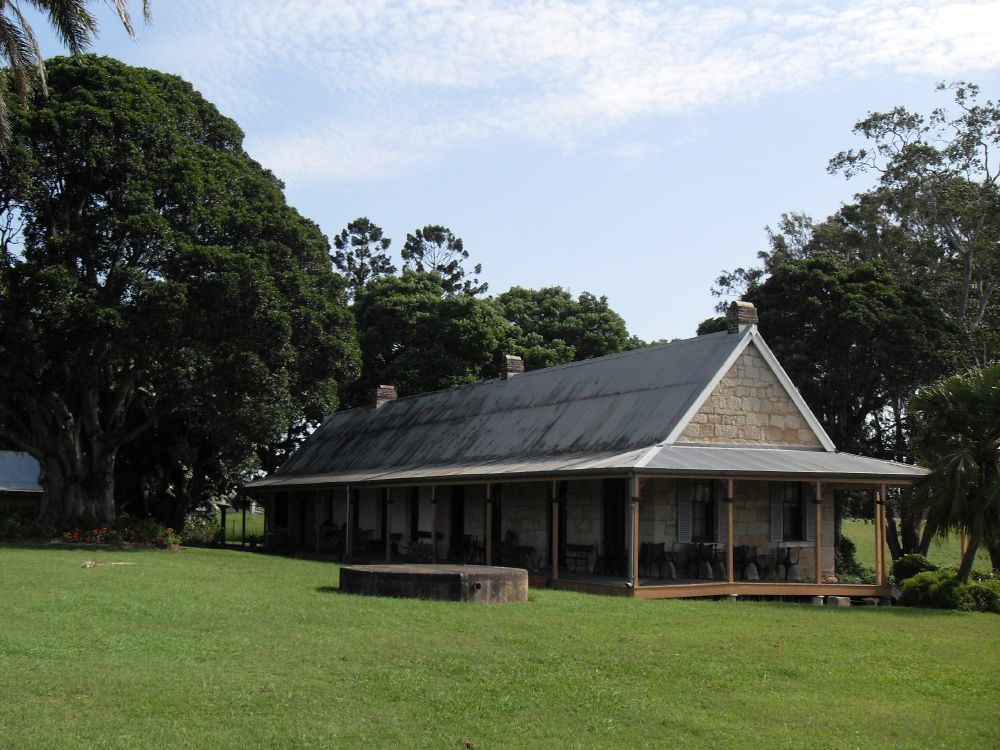
- Wolston House, from east, 2009

- Location within Queensland Location within Australia
- 27.5741°S 152.9043°E
- Location: 223 Grindle Road, Wacol, City of Brisbane, Queensland, Australia

History
- Design period: 1840s–1860s (mid-19th century)
- Built: 1852–1860s

Queensland Heritage Register
- Official name: Wolston House
- Type: state heritage (built, archaeological)
- Designated: 21 October 1992
- Reference no.: 600339
- Significant period: 1852–1860s (fabric); 1852–1960, 1965 (historical)
- Significant components: trees/plantings, farmhouse, pump, wall/s, well, pathway/walkway, gate – entrance, cellar

Wolston House is a heritage-listed museum and former homestead at 223 Grindle Road, Wacol, City of Brisbane, Queensland, Australia. It was built from 1852 to 1860s. It was added to the Queensland Heritage Register on 21 October 1992. It is now a historic house museum operated by the National Trust of Queensland.

== History ==
Wolston House comprises the homestead and garden from the Wolston Estate, a large pastoral property originally established by Dr Stephen Simpson in 1852 and extended during the 1860s by Matthew Goggs.

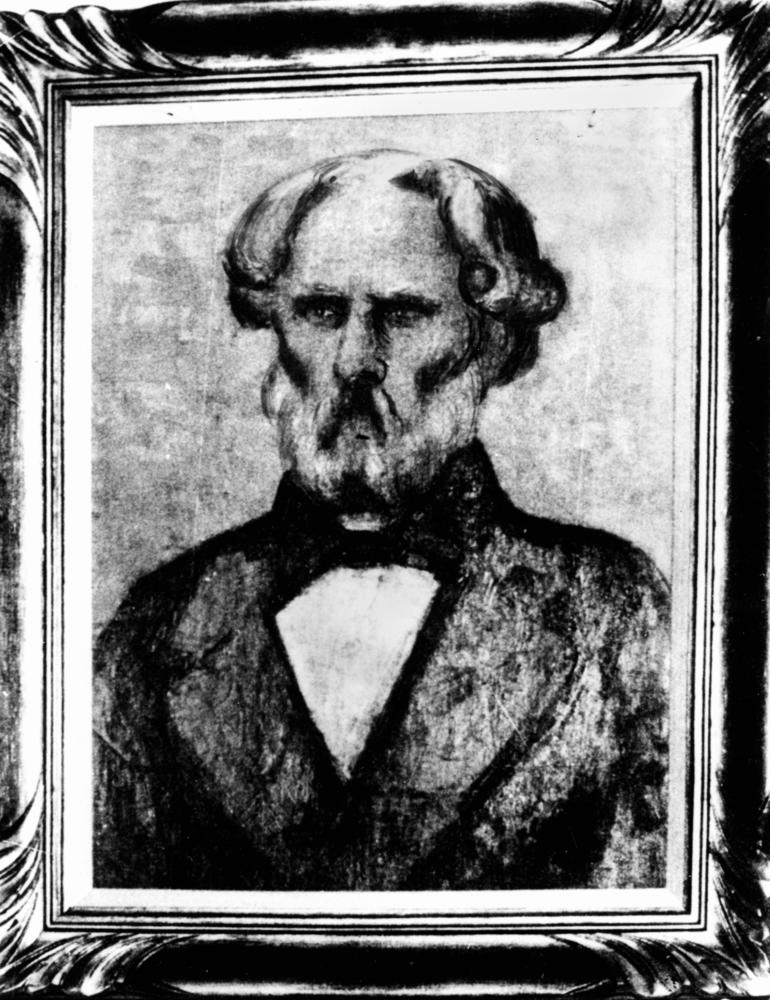
Stephen Simpson

Stephen Simpson was appointed Commissioner for Crown Lands for the Moreton Bay District in 1842 when the area was first opened up for free settlement following the closure of the penal colony. He was a cultured man, a doctor of medicine, a Justice of the Peace, a Police Magistrate and a founding Member of the Queensland Legislative Council following Separation from New South Wales. His first home in the colony was at Woogaroo (now known as Goodna), situated between Brisbane and Ipswich on what was to become the site of the Wolston Park Hospital. In 1851, when the opportunity to buy land in the area arose, he purchased 640 acres (2.6 km^{2}) to the east of his first house on land overlooking the Brisbane River.

The new property, which included stockyard, stables, outbuildings and a house and garden, was laid out by surveyor William Pettigrew in 1852. The garden was planned with care. Pettigrew recorded planting fruit trees there in his diary and Simpson was known for his interest in plants and gardening. It is possible that the fig trees at Wolston were planted by Simpson.

The house that Simpson lived in was much smaller than the Wolston homestead that now exists. He had arrived in Brisbane as a recent widower and lived simply, so that a large or formal dwelling would have been unnecessary to him. He constructed a two-room brick cottage over a sandstone basement. The house was shingled and had a detached kitchen. This cottage now forms the core of the house. The existing sandstone kitchen which adjoins this section may have been added by Simpson before he sold the house in 1860 or it may have been added by Goggs.

After his wife and child died, Simpson had designated his nephew, John Ommaney (for whom Mount Ommaney is named) as his heir. On 11 March 1856 the young man, aged 20, was riding from Wolston station and was thrown from his horse. The horse returned to Wolson and a search was undertaken. Ommaney was found on the ground insensible and, despite medical attention, died. His body was taken by steamer to be buried in the Church of England cemetery at Paddington. This may have affected Simpson's commitment to remaining in the colony and a few years later, he put the Wolston estate up for sale and returned to England. According to the auction notice which appeared in the Moreton Bay Courier of 3 January 1860 the estate was by then well established with 2,000 acres (8.1 km^{2}) of fenced land, an extensive garden and orchards and 250 head of horses and 400 of cattle.

Wolston was purchased by Matthew Buscall Goggs in October 1860. He continued to operate the estate as a cattle and horse breeding station and extended the holding to 100,000 acres (400 km^{2}). Goggs, who was a farmer's son, had emigrated to Australia in 1841 and took up land at Chinchilla with his first wife. He purchased Wolston following his second marriage to Anne Gedge and they had a family of ten children. Goggs built a sandstone extension to the house in the 1860s to accommodate the needs of his family and in the 1870s a cedar annexe was added containing children's bedrooms. Goggs died in 1882 and was buried in a mausoleum which he had had built in the grounds of the estate. This was damaged in the 1893 floods and the bodies of Goggs and two infants were reburied at Toowong Cemetery.

Following Gogg's death, his eldest son, also named Matthew Buscall, ran the estate until around 1890 when he moved to Brisbane. A Mr Thomas Matthews is recorded in Post Office Directories as having lived at Wolston between 1890 and 1893 and may have leased the property from the Goggs family. Over the years the family had bought and sold land and by 1907 the Wolston property had been reduced to 650 acres (2.6 km^{2}) of land around Wolston House.

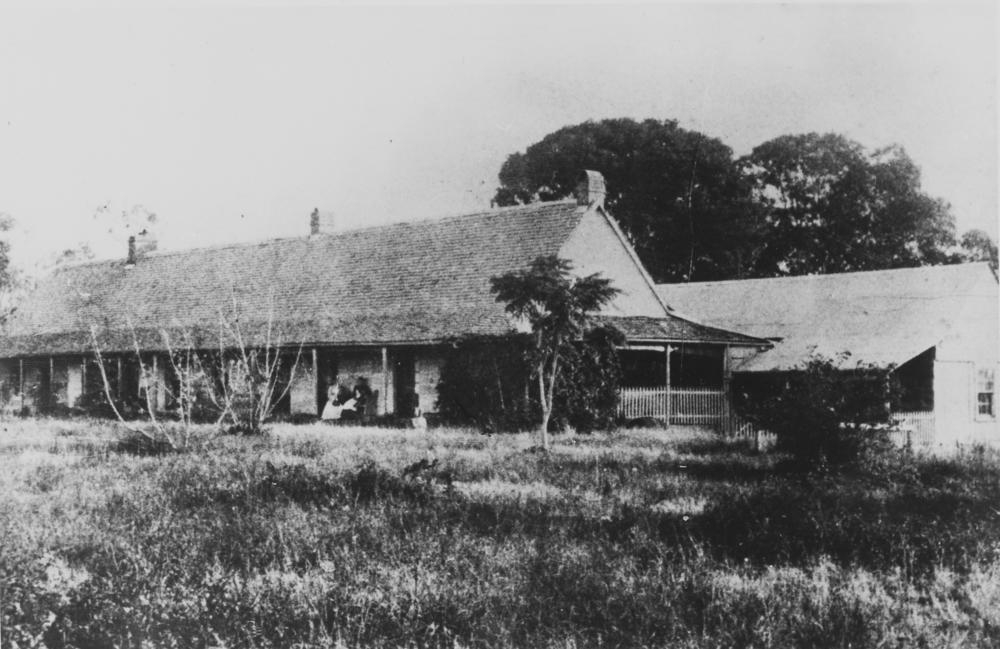
Wolston House, 1890

In 1907 the Grindle family purchased the property. They built it up and operated a successful dairy, milking 120 cows a day and selling the milk to Brisbane. They covered the shingle roof with corrugated iron and rationalised the spacing of the verandah posts which had previously been irregularly spaced, reflecting the stages in which the house was extended.

In 1956 the estate was purchased by Robert Hurley. By this time the property had become run down and the house was inhabited by three elderly Grindle brothers who were no longer able to run the property. At the time this consisted of 117 acres (47 ha) of freehold land in poor condition. The Hurleys built up the property again establishing an intensive dairying business.

In 1960 the Queensland Department of Agriculture and Stock resumed the property to establish a tick research centre. They demolished the farm outbuildings and intended to demolish the homestead also, however this was saved following an intensive campaign by the Queensland Women's Historical Association, the Royal Historical Society of Queensland and the newly formed National Trust of Queensland. In 1965, the house was transferred to the National Trust and became their first property. Sir Raphael Cilento, who was to become the second president of the Trust between 1966 and 1971, and the architect Karl Langer, were prominent in the acquisition of the homestead and in its interpretation.

This interpretation rested on the occupation of the property by Dr Stephen Simpson and so it was decided to demolish the timber section at the rear, which was clearly of a later period. When acquired by the Trust, the house was in poor condition. Along with urgent repairs, extensive reconstruction was also carried out. While reflecting the philosophies of the early 1960s, this approach is not acceptable today. Current conservation philosophy, in line with the recommendations of the Burra Charter, favours minimal intervention and interpretation embraces the whole life of the house and its setting. Wolston House has now been owned by the Trust for over thirty years, and is still open to the public as a museum, so that the effects of changes in conservation philosophies and methods over this period can be studied.

== Description ==
Wolston House is on a rural site between Brisbane and Ipswich overlooking the Brisbane River. The surrounding land is now occupied by Wacol Correctional Centre and the Department of Primary Industries and retains its pastoral aspect. The house is surrounded by a mature garden containing large trees, a well and a pump.

The house is constructed of sandstone and brick with a galvanised iron roof and has six rooms. Two cellars with attached lean-tos form a half basement accessed from the rear. The house is one room deep with the rooms disposed along a verandah supported by timber posts. The rooms are accessed by French windows without a formal entrance. These consist of a large double room divided by folding cedar doors, a bedroom, dining room and a kitchen which is set at a slightly lower level. Much of the joinery is original, however, much of the plaster wall finishes have been reconstructed and the ceilings, which were thought to have been pressed metal and plaster, have been rebuilt in second hand timber.

To the rear of the house, brick basement walls remain from the 1860s children's wing which was demolished in the 1970s. Wolston functions as a house museum and a modern caretaker's residence is situated to one side of the house. There is a modern toilet block behind the house and a timber railway building has been moved to the rear of the site as a store. The gate posts and part of the wall shown in 1930s photographs survives as do elements of original paving.

The collection, which has been developed to furnish the house, does not relate to it but contains some items associated with people who lived or worked on the property. It contains some significant early furniture and objects.

== Heritage listing ==
Wolston House was listed on the Queensland Heritage Register on 21 October 1992 having satisfied the following criteria.

The place is important in demonstrating the evolution or pattern of Queensland's history.

It is also associated with the formation of the National Trust of Queensland and with Sir Raphael Cilento and Karl Langer, who played major roles in the acquisition of Wolston House as the Trust's foundation property.

The place demonstrates rare, uncommon or endangered aspects of Queensland's cultural heritage.

Wolston House is a rare surviving early homestead, mainly constructed in the 1860s but incorporating an 1852 cottage. The materials and workmanship which survive from these stages of building illustrate techniques not commonly found in small rural buildings of this period.

The place is important in demonstrating the principal characteristics of a particular class of cultural places.

By its form and the lack of a formal entry, the building demonstrates something of the way of life of the first European settlers of the district.

The place is important because of its aesthetic significance.

The nature of the building and its relationship with the landscape has considerable aesthetic appeal which is well liked by the community.

The place has a special association with the life or work of a particular person, group or organisation of importance in Queensland's history.

The earliest part of the house is associated with Dr Stephen Simpson (1792–1869), a man prominent in public life during the first years of Brisbane. It is also associated with the formation of the National Trust of Queensland and with Sir Raphael Cilento and Karl Langer, who played major roles in the acquisition of Wolston House as the Trust's foundation property.
