= Gage John Hall =

General Gage John Hall
- Born: c. 1775
- Died: 18 April 1854 (aged 79) near Exeter, Devon
- Military career
- Allegiance: United Kingdom
- Branch: British Army
- Service years: 1783–
- Rank: General

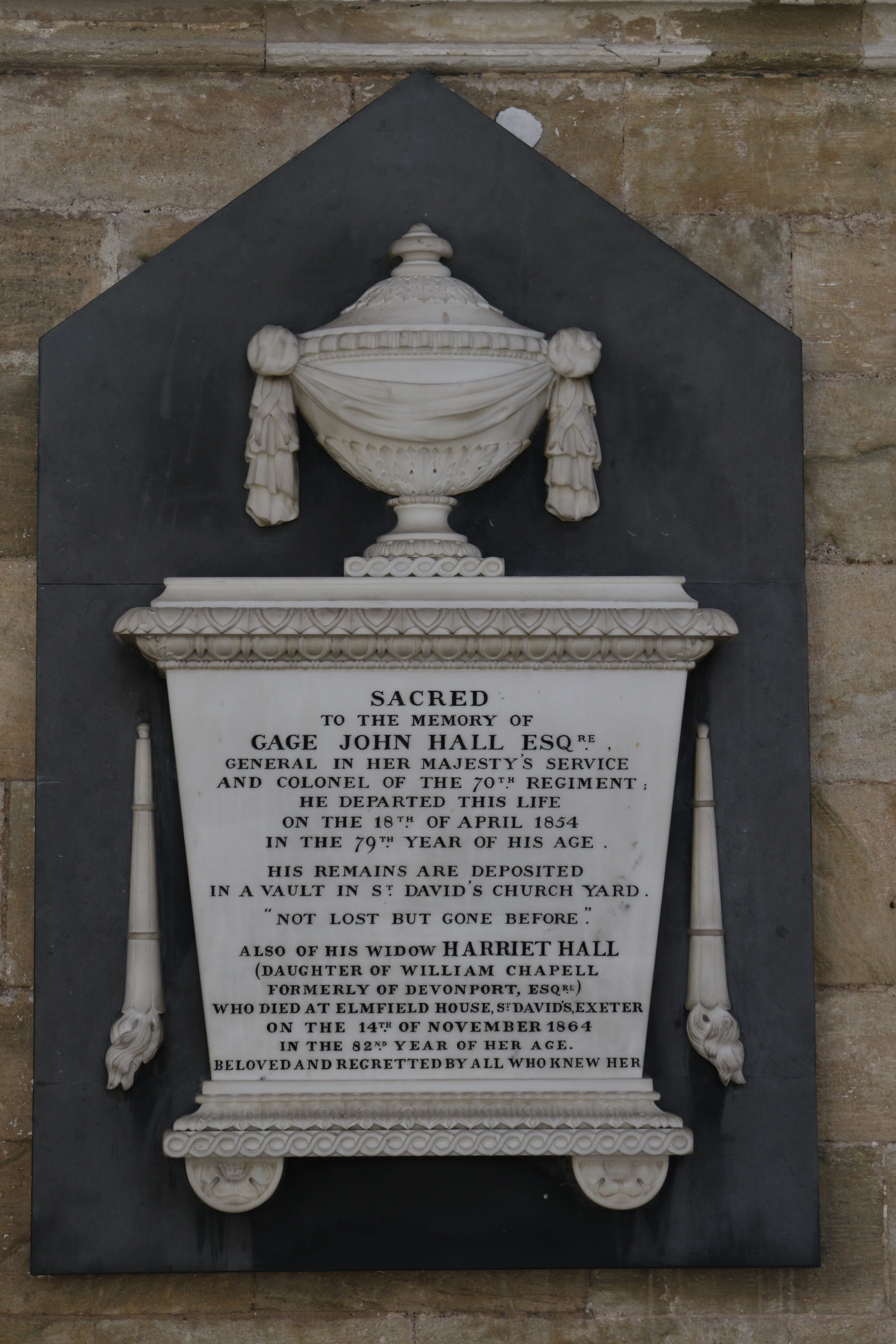
Memorial to Gage John Hall in Exeter Cathedral

General Gage John Hall (c.1775 – 18 April 1854) was a British Army officer.

== Military career ==
Hall was commissioned as an ensign on 29 May 1783. Promoted to lieutenant-colonel on 1 January 1801 and to major-general on 4 June 1813, he served as acting Governor of British Mauritius from November 1817 to December 1818. He raised the 99th (Lanarkshire) Regiment of Foot in response to the threat posed by the French intervention in Spain, in March 1824.

Hall was promoted to lieutenant-general on 27 March 1825 and to full general on 23 November 1841.

Military offices
Preceded by Kenneth Howard, 1st Earl of Effingham	Colonel of the 70th (Surrey) Regiment of Foot; 1832–1854	Succeeded by Sir George William Paty
