= Millmerran Power Station =

Coal-fired power station in Australia

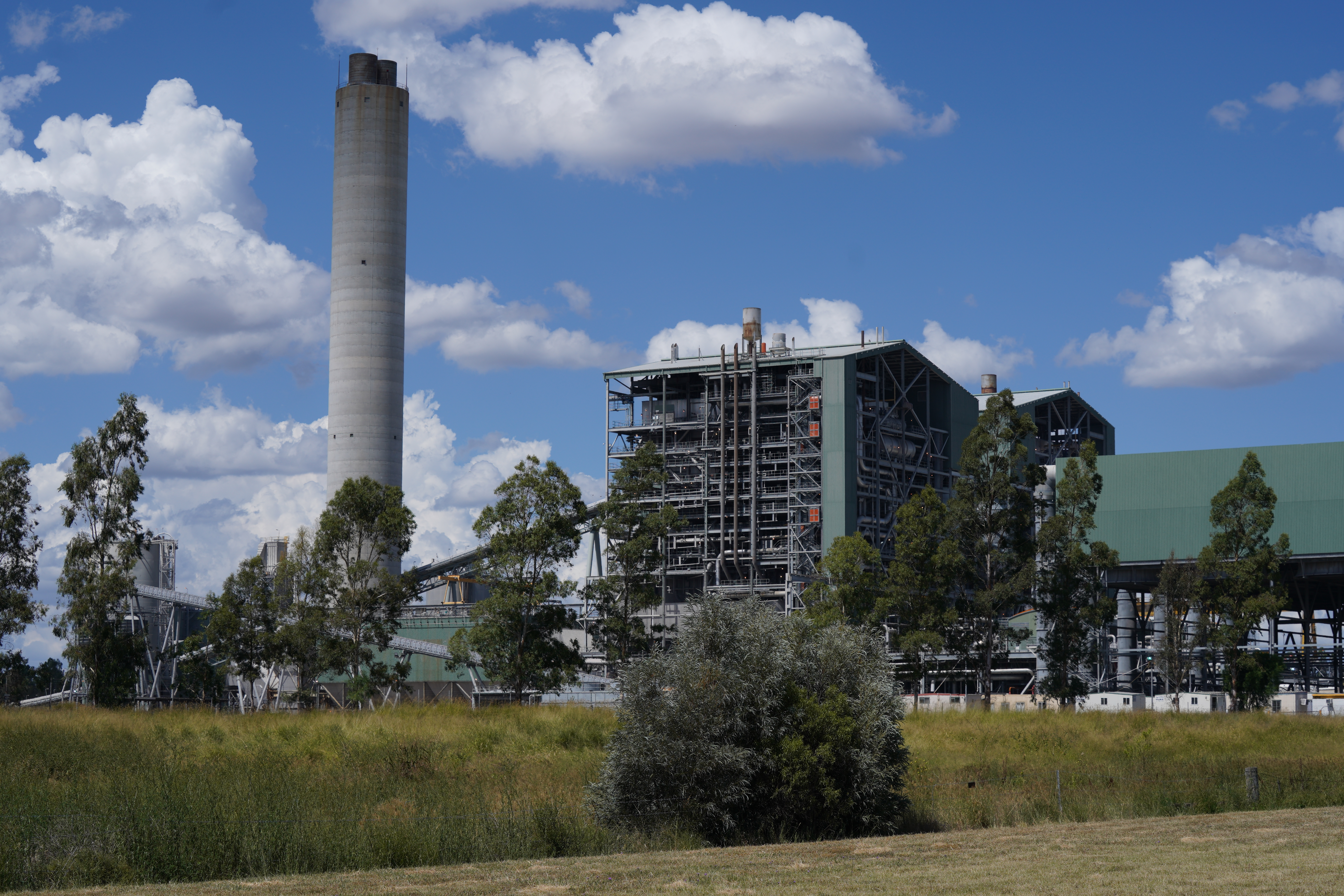
- Millmerran Power Station in February 2022
- Country: Australia
- Location: Domville, Queensland
- Coordinates: 27°57′42″S 151°16′45″E
- Commission date: 2002
- Construction cost: $1.5 Billion
- Owner: InterGen

Thermal power station
- Primary fuel: Coal (Open-cut mine)

Power generation
- Nameplate capacity: 850 MW

The Millmerran Power Station is a coal-fired power station in Domville, south of Millmerran in the Darling Downs region of Queensland, Australia. The power station was commissioned in 2002 and cost $1.5 billion to build. The power station is owned and operated by InterGen, a multinational company owned by Sev.en Energy, a Czech industrial group and AIG Highstar Capital II, a private equity fund sponsored by a subsidiary of American International Group, Inc.

The plant takes advantage of the abundant deposits of bituminous coal from the Surat Basin. Fuel is transported via conveyor belt from the open-cut Commodore Mine.

Water is supplied via pipeline from the Wetalla sewage treatment plant in Toowoomba. The 850 MW plant uses air cooling technology to reduce water consumption. In 2002, when the plant became operational, wholesale prices for electricity fell by about one third to $20/MWh. This was due to the market strategy to bid at short run marginal cost - so with high efficiency plant and cheap coal, this had a significant impact on the market.

Millmerran Power Station which won the Banksia Environmental Award 2006 in the water category, supplies enough electricity to power approximately 1.1 million homes by selling all its electricity into the National Electricity Market (NEM).

Carbon Monitoring for Action estimates this power station emits 5.75 million tonnes of greenhouse gases each year as a result of burning coal. The Australian Government has announced the introduction of a Carbon Pollution Reduction Scheme commencing in 2010 to help combat climate change. It is expected to impact on emissions from power stations. The National Pollutant Inventory provides details of other pollutant emissions, but, as at 23 November 2008, not CO_{2}.

== See also ==
- List of active power stations in Queensland
