= Old Moppy =

Old Moppy (c.1787-c.1842) was an Aboriginal leader, guide, warrior and resistance fighter. Also known as Moppy the chief, Chief Moppy, Moppé, Moppee and Mappe by the colonists and settlers in south-east Queensland. Old Moppy was a Ugarapul man from the Lockyer Valley region who drew together an alliance of Aboriginal nations in resistance to the early settlement in the Moreton Bay and Brisbane area. Some sources confuse or blend Old Moppy with his son, who was also called Moppy but was better known as Multuggerah.

Old Moppy was a tall man, a warrior, described as "A more formidable looking fellow than Moppe I never saw. He was about forty years old, upwards of seven feet high, beautifully proportioned, and the muscles of his upper arms reminded me of the gnarled trunk of an oak." James Campbell recorded that “old Moppy, it appears, was a very powerful chief. It was said by the late John Kent, Esq., who was a man of figures, that Moppy could raise twelve hundred fighting men”.

== Frontier war ==
Old Moppy emerged as a leader in the early 1830s. In 1837, he led an inter-tribal fight against coastal Aboriginal groups at Taringa. With his allies from the Scenic Rim, gathering more than 700 warriors for the battle. Old Moppy’s authority and influence stretched across Moreton and as far as the western slopes of the Main Range.

In October 1840 Lieutenant Owen Gorman, commandant of the Moreton Bay penal colony, met "Chief Moppy" while on a surveying trip. Old Moppy sent two of his sons to accompany Gorman’s party on their route to cross the Dividing Range. Gorman gave Old Moppy a breastplate inscribed ‘King of Upper Brisbane’. When an escaped convict, James Baker, who had lived with Old Moppy’s community for fifteen years, explained what the words on the breastplate meant, Old Moppy returned the breastplate.

From 1841 to 1848, Old Moppy and later his son Multuggerah and warriors from various Aboriginal groups conducted raids and sieges to intercept, starve out and evict settlers. Following the massacre of 50-60 Aboriginal people on Kilcoy Station in 1842 there was an uprising against the colonists. Inter-tribal meetings were held and Old Moppy was instrumental in forging an alliance among the groups. Moppy was a serious threat to the settlers, leading a raid of 300 - 500 warriors from the Wakka Wakka and Kabi Kabi peoples driving many of the settlers back.

Gorman had promised to help find and punish the settlers who had shot at Old Moppy’s people. When Gorman failed to punish the offenders Old Moppy led hundreds of warriors in retaliation attacking the settlements of Upper Brisbane. All flocks of sheep had to be temporarily removed from the valley due to Old Moppy’s raids. Gorman held a committal hearing into the violence that had taken place in the area, arresting James ‘Cocky’ Rogers, a European who worked at Eton Vale station who was responsible for initiating the attack on Old Moppy’s camp and starting the conflict. Rogers was acquitted due to the testimony of other settlers and sought revenge on Old Moppy.

Old Moppy’s camp was attacked by 35 - 50 settlers. The people killed in the raid included Old Moppy’s eldest son, Wooinambi. Soon after the raid, Old Moppy was shot and killed in a surprise attack at Blackfellows Creek (Tent Hill) while he was fishing. Multuggerah vowed to avenge the deaths of his father and brother gathering neighbouring clans to continue to resist the settlers. Multuggerah led an ambush at Mount Tabletop, known as the Battle of One Tree Hill, one of the largest battles in the Australian frontier wars.

== See also ==
- Australian frontier wars
- List of Indigenous Australian historical figures
