= Siege of Badajoz =

Siege of Badajoz may refer to:

- Siege of Badajoz (1169)
- Siege of Badajoz (1658)
- Siege of Badajoz (1705)
- First Siege of Badajoz (1811)
- Second Siege of Badajoz (1811)
- Siege of Badajoz (1812)

== See also ==
- Battle of Badajoz (disambiguation)
