= Multuggerah =

Aboriginal Australian resistance fighter

Multuggerah (c. 1810 – 1846) was an Aboriginal Australian leader and resistance fighter of the Ugarapul nation from the Lockyer Valley in Queensland. He was an important warrior and negotiator, bringing numerous Aboriginal clans together in an armed resistance against the 99th (Lanarkshire) Regiment of Foot, squatters and the squatters' servants and other workers in the 1840s.

Multuggerah was the son of Old Moppy a warrior and leader who had led earlier raids against the early settlers in the Moreton Bay and Brisbane regions.

== Resistance ==
From 1841 over the course of decades, 1200 Aboriginal warriors in the Colony of New South Wales in the Lockyer Valley area (which became part of the Colony of Queensland from 1859), were opposed by, amongst others, the 99th (Lanarkshire) Regiment of Foot. Intermittent conflict continued on into the 1850s and 1860s. The line of settlement was held back by 15 years of armed conflict. Multeggerah's tactics included road blocks made from felled trees, and setting an ambush site on a steep hill and in amongst bogs and heavy scrub. Multeggerah was said by some to have lived to old age; but possibly died in 1846 as part of the continuing conflict.

=== Battle of One Tree Hill ===
The mass poisoning at Kilcoy Station instigated a strengthening of resistance activity. Multeggerah organised ambushes of the supply drays on their way up the escarpment from the coast; "He had sent word to the Europeans, warning them not to come through."

In September 1843 an armed convoy of three drays with a crew of 18 was stopped and turned back. A counter attack against the Aboriginal battle group by more than 30 squatters and their servants was also turned back from the high ground by the use of spears and thrown rocks.

== Legacy ==
The 800-metre (2,600 ft) viaduct on the Warrego Highway section of the Toowoomba Bypass was named in honour of Multuggerah. He is known to have had at least two children, a son and a daughter known as Queen Kitty.

== See also ==
- Australian frontier wars
- List of Indigenous Australian historical figures
