= Commodore Mine (Queensland, Australia) =

Coal mine in Queensland, Australia

- Location within Australia

Location
- Location: Queensland, Australia; 27.944294°S 151.258300°E

Production
- Products: Thermal black coal
- Production: 3.6Mtpa
- Type: Open-pit

Owner
- Company: InterGen Australia – 53.69% Marubeni Corporation – 30% GEC – 6.31% EIF Group – 5% Tohoku Electric Power – 5% Franco-Nevada Corporation – Royalties

The Commodore mine is an open-pit coal mine located in Domville and Clontarf, Toowoomba Region, Queensland, Australia. The majority stake in the mine is owned by InterGen Australia.

== History ==
Since 2000, the engineering company Downer EDI Mining has been operating the Commodore Mine.

In September 2014, Downer EDI Mining renewed its contract to manage the mine for 5 more years for $250 million.

In September 2018, Downer EDI Mining renewed its contract to manage the mine for 5 more years for $286 million.

== Description ==
Situated around 200 kilometers west of Brisbane in Queensland's Surat Basin, the Commodore Mine is adjacent to the 850 mega-watt coal-fired Millmerran Power Station, to which the mine is the only source of coal fuel supply, having made its first delivery there in February 2003.

The Commodore mine employs about 50 staff onsite in total. Almost half the total workforce has been employed from the local community. The mine's geology is made up of gently folded Walloon coal measures of middle Jurassic age, dipping generally at less than three degrees. Three banded seams are visible: Kooroongarra (up to 3 metres thick), Commodore (averaging 5.2metres thick) and Bottom Rider (between 0.5metres and 0.9metres thick).

The mine operates on biodiesel fuel, and developed a system that independently verifies fugitive methane gas emissions.

By 1 January 1999, Commodore had a thermal coal resource of 177Mt. The mine produced 3.250Mt to 31 December 2005, and has roughly 3.6Mtpa production capacity.

The mine was operated by Downer EDI. The mine was operated by BUMA (new owner of Downer EDI mining arm), however after breakdown of negotiations in 2024, the mine operation tender was awarded to EPSA.

== Ownership ==
- InterGen Australia – 53.69%
- Marubeni Corporation – 30%
- GEC – 6.31%
- EIF Group – 5%
- Tohoku Electric Power – 5%
- Franco-Nevada Corporation – Royalties

== Awards ==
- 2011: Premiers ClimateSmart Sustainability Award
