= Kilcoy Homestead =

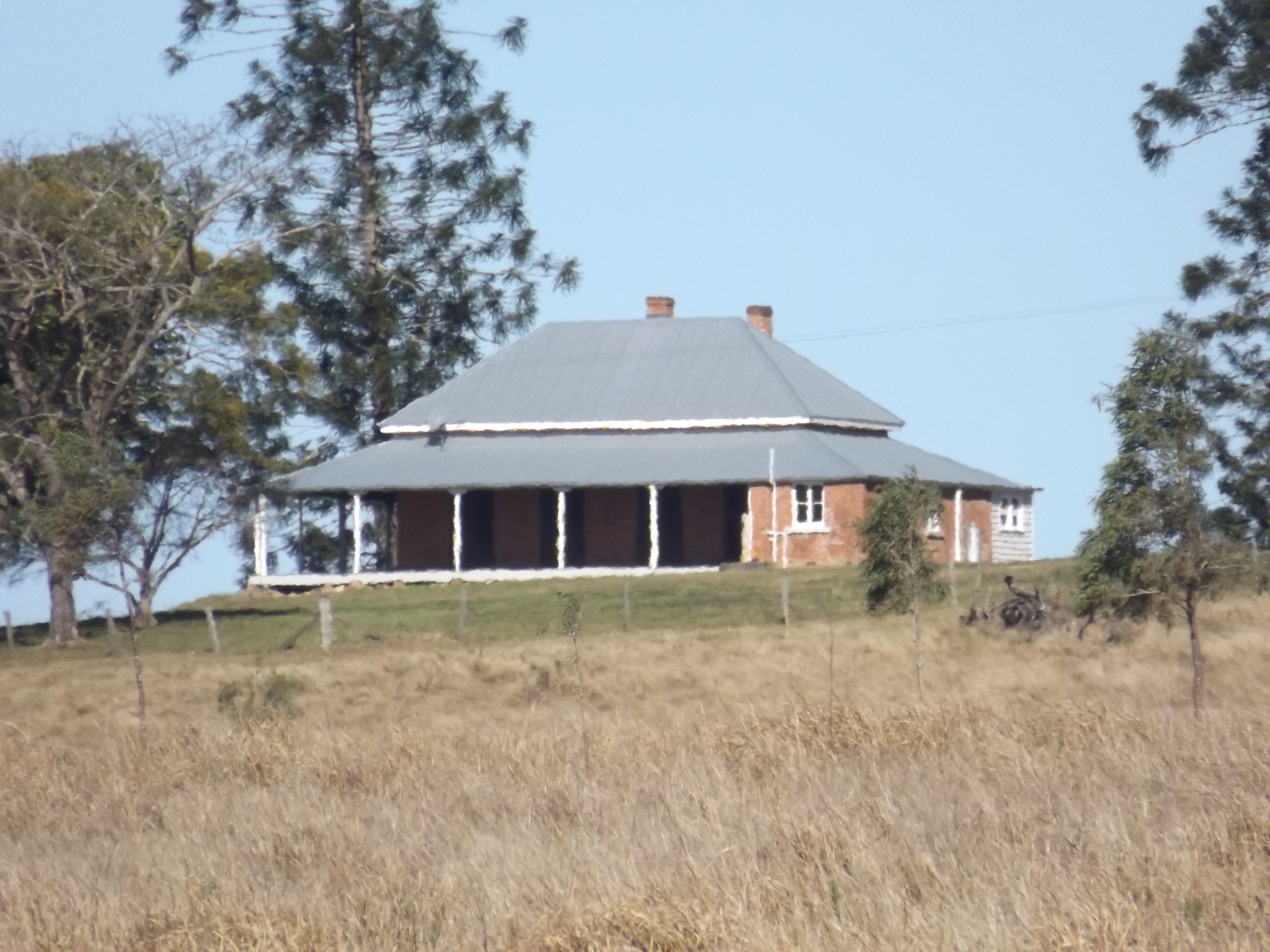
- Building in 2015

- Location within Queensland Location within Australia
- 26.9282°S 152.5721°E
- Location: Kilcoy-Murgon Road, Kilcoy, Somerset Region, Queensland, Australia

History
- Design period: 1840s–1860s (mid-19th century)
- Built: c. 1857

Queensland Heritage Register
- Official name: Kilcoy Homestead
- Type: state heritage (landscape, built)
- Designated: 21 October 1992
- Reference no.: 600638
- Significant period: 1850s (historical); 1850s (fabric)
- Significant components: garden/grounds, shed/s, trees/plantings, residential accommodation – main house

Kilcoy Homestead is a heritage-listed homestead at Kilcoy-Murgon Road, Winya, Somerset Region, Queensland, Australia. It was built c. 1857. It was added to the Queensland Heritage Register on 21 October 1992.

== History ==
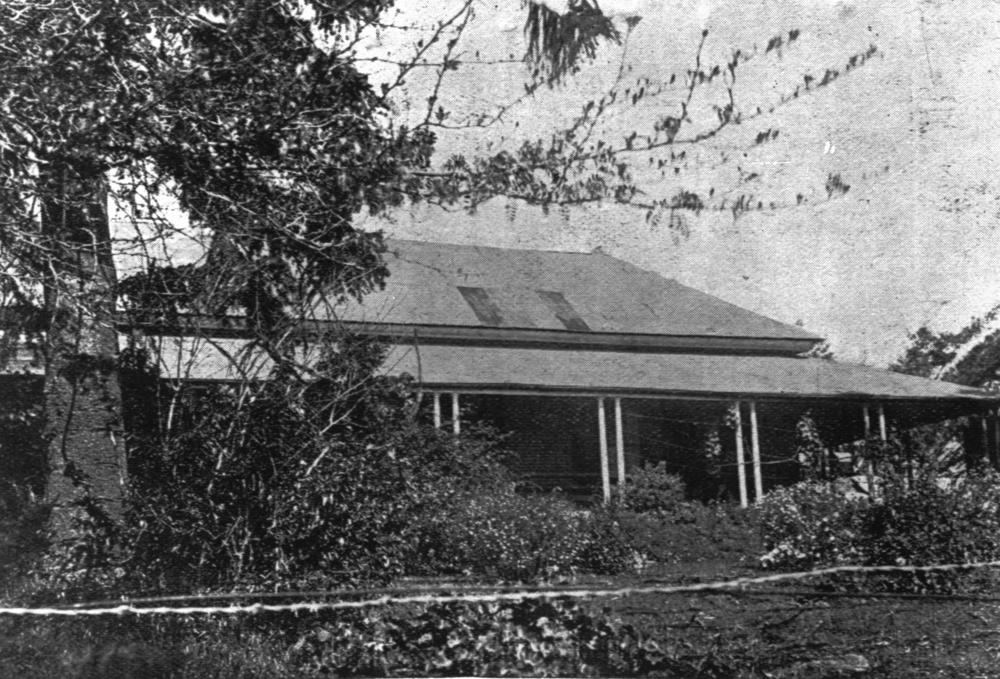
Homestead on Kilcoy Station, 1902

Kilcoy Homestead, a single-storeyed, substantial brick residence, was constructed c.1857, for the Hon. Louis Hope, British aristocrat and Queensland grazier, sugar plantation owner and politician. The remnants of the early brick cottage on the site, also erected for Hope, date to the mid-1860s.

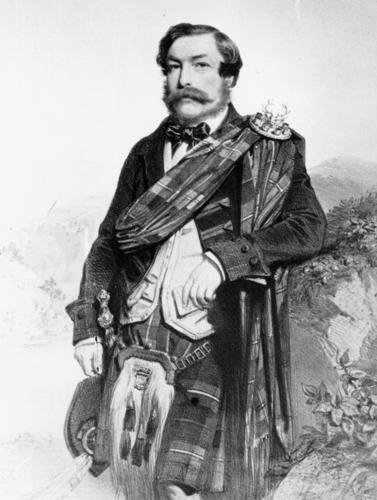
Sir Evan Mackenzie

The Kilcoy run had been taken up as a sheep station by brothers Evan and Colin Mackenzie, of Kilcoy, Scotland, who had started clearing the land and erecting huts by early July 1841. In October that year they secured the run officially, taking out the second pastoral licence issued for the Upper Brisbane Valley. In the New South Wales Government Gazette of 11 May 1848, Kilcoy was described as comprising over 35,000 acres (14,000 ha), bounded on the south by Frederic and Francis Bigge's Mt Brisbane Station, on the east by the Archers' Durundur Station, on the west by John Balfour's Colinton run, and to the north by the mountains separating Wide Bay from the Brisbane Valley. Establishment of Kilcoy station was resisted by the indigenous population, and the run is infamous for the mass poisoning of 50 or 60 Aboriginal people that occurred there in February 1842.

As on most early stations, the first Kilcoy head station, erected in mid-1841, was a simple slab hut. In 1844 this was replaced by a brick dwelling, described in February 1845 as containing five rooms – one a large sitting room 20 by 20 feet (6.1 by 6.1 m) and four bedrooms 10-by-10-foot (3.0 by 3.0 m) opening from the parlour – with a verandah in front. The kitchen, which may have been the early slab dwelling, stood about 40 yards (37 m) from the rear of the new residence, and was demolished c. 1928.

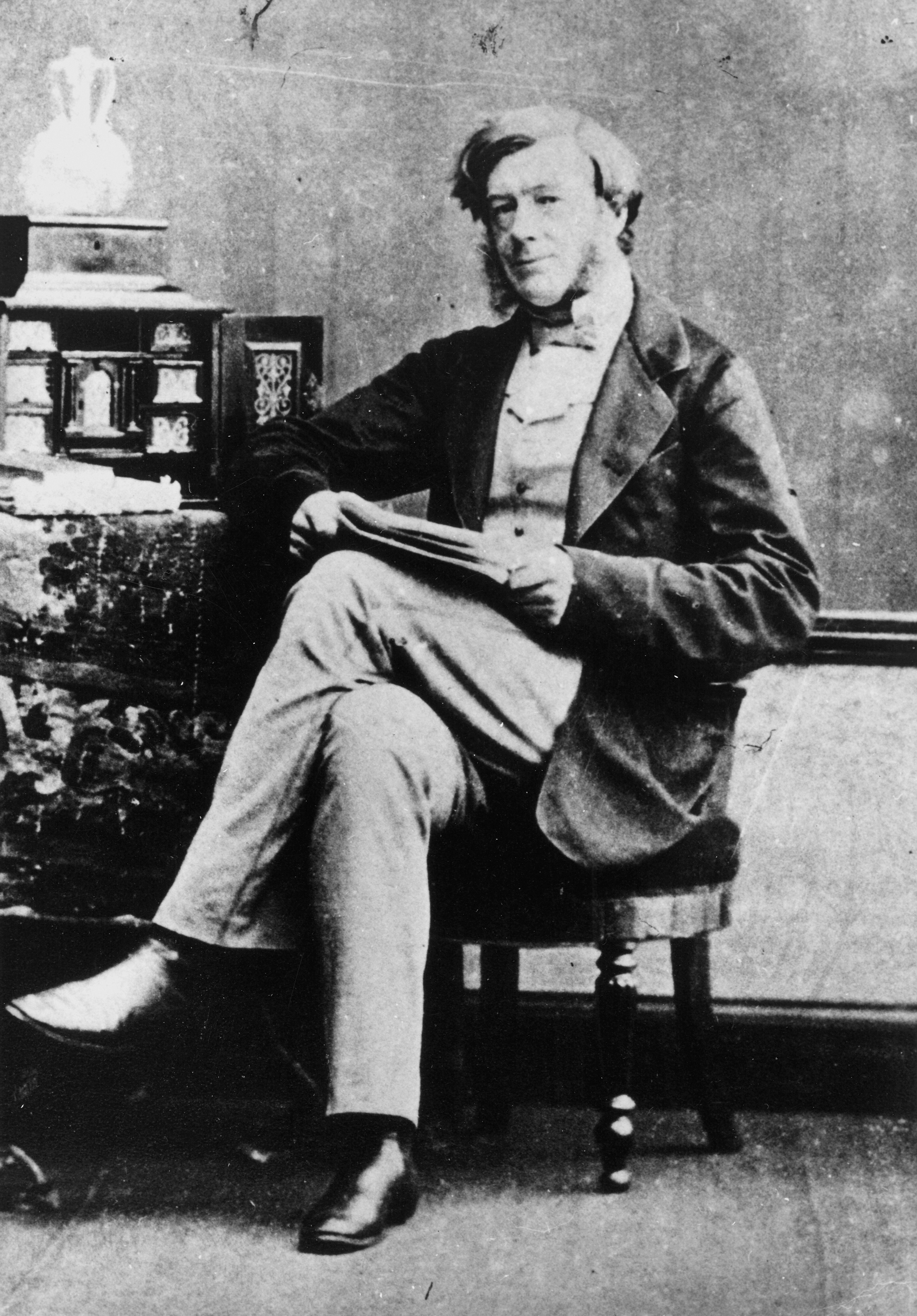
Captain Louis Hope

Although Colin Mackenzie remained in Moreton Bay and the Darling Downs until about 1857, Evan Mackenzie left Moreton Bay in mid-1845. Their Kilcoy run was transferred to Charles A Atherton in 1849. During 1852 the artist James G. Sawkins visited Kilcoy.

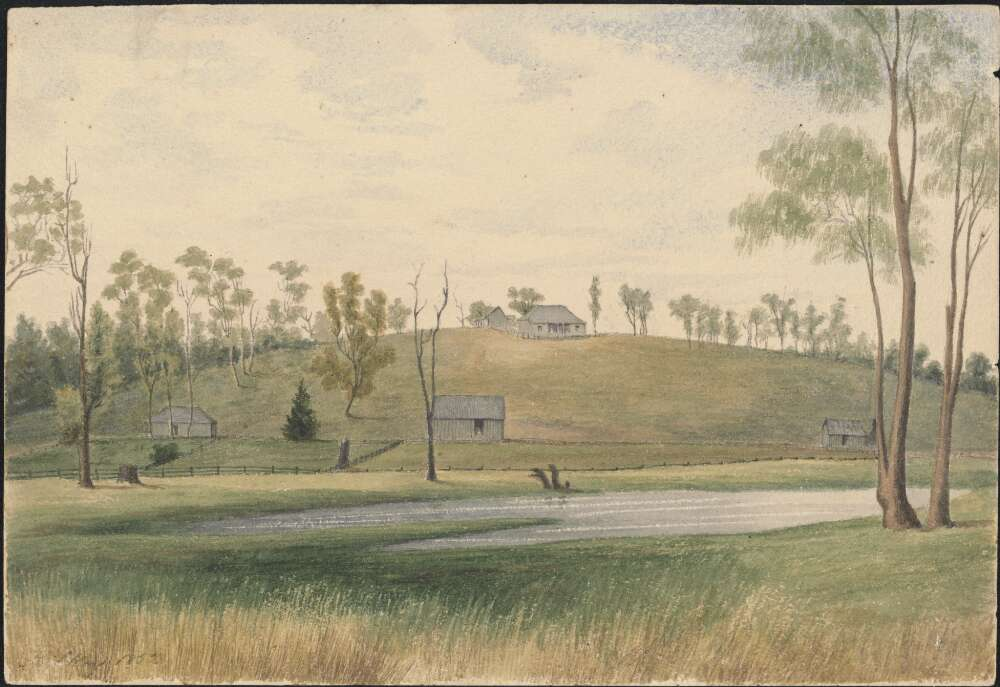
The cattle station of Mr Atherton, a watercolour by James Gay Sawkins, 1852

A year later, ownership transferred to the Hon. Louis Hope and Robert Ramsay. Whether Ramsay ever worked the station is not clear; Hope was running it with the assistance of a superintendent by October 1857, when bricks were being fired on the property in preparation for the construction of his new residence, the present homestead. The 1844 residence was white-ant ridden, and is understood to have been demolished when the c. 1857 house was completed. In 1863, Hope purchased Ramsay's interest in Kilcoy.

Hope had arrived in New South Wales in 1843, was an active participant in early Queensland economic and political life, and was instrumental in the development of the sugar industry in Queensland. In the 1850s he purchased and/or leased extensive landholdings in the Moreton region, including Kilcoy Station in 1853, Shafston House at Kangaroo Point in 1854, and land at Cleveland, 1852–55. Hope's Cleveland property, Ormiston House Estate, was being farmed by c. 1858, and in the early 1860s he experimented there first with cotton, then sugar cane, establishing Queensland's first sugar plantation at Ormiston. In 1864–65, Hope erected at Ormiston a substantial brick residence, not unlike the Kilcoy homestead, but more ornate. From this time the Hope family lived principally at Ormiston House, the homestead at Kilcoy became the manager's residence, and a brick cottage was built at Kilcoy for use by Louis Hope on his frequent visits to the property.

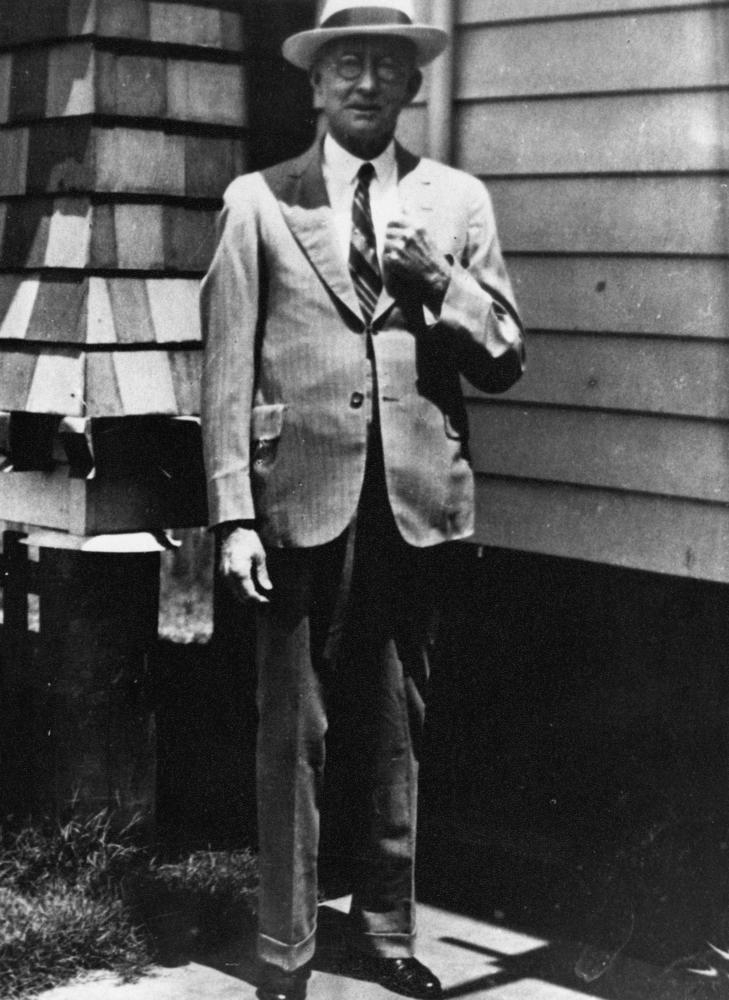
Jeremiah Kennedy

William Butler was appointed manager of Kilcoy in 1871, commencing an association with Kilcoy that lasted over 50 years. In 1882 the Hopes returned to England, leaving Kilcoy and Ormiston, which was rented out, under Butler's supervision. At Kilcoy, Butler established excellent relationships with local Aborigines, and after his death a Kilcoy street was named after him and a monument erected in his honour.

Louis Hope died in Geneva, Switzerland, in 1894, but Kilcoy Homestead remained the property of his heirs until 1908, when the house on 524-acre (212 ha) freehold was purchased by William Butler. Local grazier Jeremiah Kennedy of Monte Cassino, acquired the homestead in 1924. Kennedy was very involved in local government and, like previous owners, committed to horseracing. Kilcoy Homestead remains the property of the Kennedy family, but a caretaker has been in residence for many years.

== Description ==
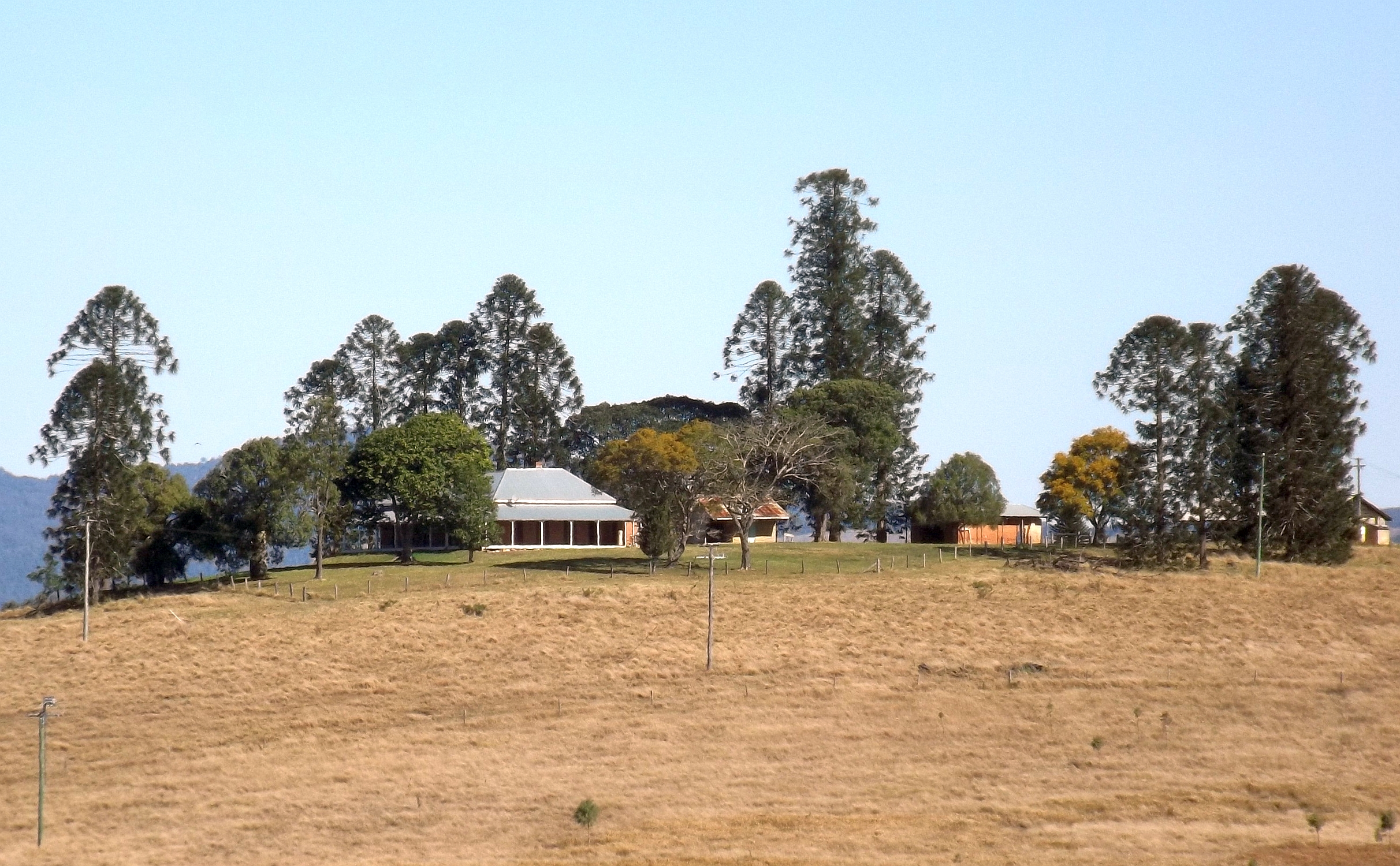
Homestead and property, 2015

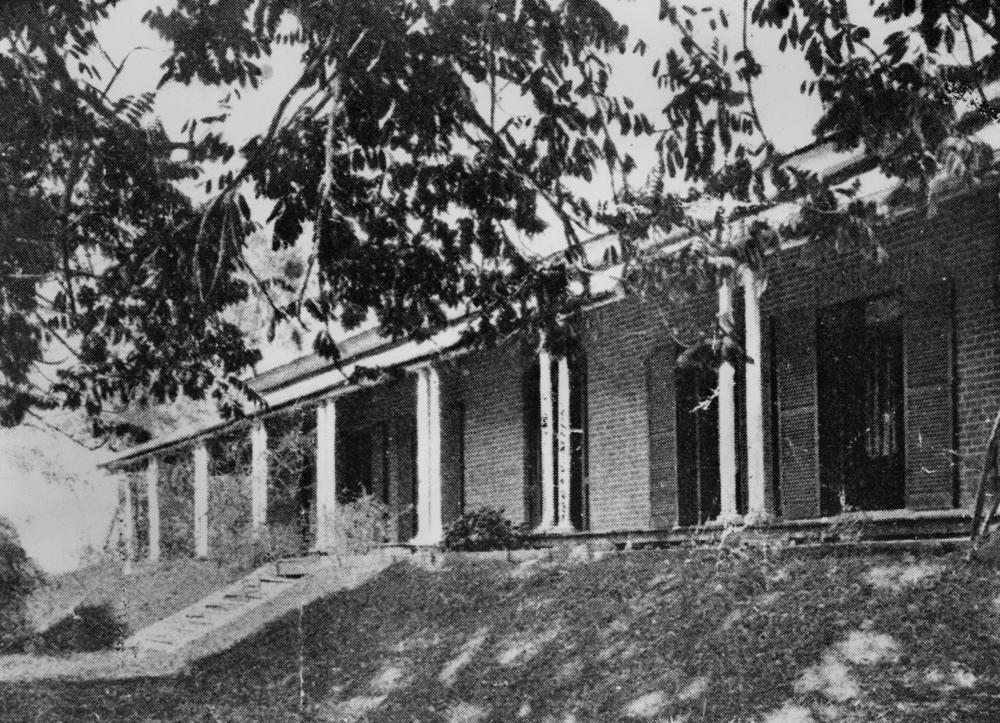
Homestead at Kilcoy Station, ca. 1932

Kilcoy Homestead, a single-storeyed brick residence with a hipped corrugated iron roof, is located at the end of a ridge to the north of Kilcoy, overlooking Kilcoy Creek and surrounding farmland. The building, reflecting a strong Georgian influence in its design, is approached from the southwest via a driveway along the ridge top.

The building, L-shaped in plan, is constructed of English Bond brickwork and is surrounded by verandahs with the southern side being enclosed. French doors with shutters open onto verandahs which have unlined corrugated iron skillion roofs and timber posts. The main entry is positioned centrally on the northeast, with a set of brick steps accessing the verandah to a flat arched doorway with double cedar panelled doors with fanlight and sidelights opening to the entrance hall. A matching doorway accesses the entrance hall from the enclosed rear verandah.

The building's core is one room deep, with the northeast wing consisting of a central entry hall, a bedroom on the north, a living room on the south, store rooms at the southern end and brick lean-to store rooms at the rear. The rear wing has one large bedroom, an enclosed verandah on the south housing a kitchen and a brick lean-to at the rear housing a bathroom.

Internally, the walls are plastered, the ceilings are boarded and skirtings, doors and architraves are of cedar. The entry hall has unset sandstone flagging to the floor and other principal rooms have boarded floors. The two northeast rooms have fireplaces with timber surrounds. The kitchen and bathroom are later alterations. The southern store rooms have a loft space, and a basement wine cellar which is no longer accessible. The lean-to store rooms at the rear, one being the former lamp room, have concrete floors.

The homestead grounds include mature Bunya Pines, with other plantings of native and European trees. A terraced area to the northeast of the building may be the site of an early tennis court.

The remains of a brick shed is located to the southwest of the building. This consists of two side walls, the northern one housing a fireplace, with a freestanding gable roof supported on metal posts. A former railway station building, titled WINYA and constructed of weatherboard with a corrugated iron gable roof, has been moved onto the site and is located between the homestead and the brick shed.

A dairy and stables, constructed of brick and timber with a corrugated iron gable roof, is located further to the southwest alongside the driveway.

== Heritage listing ==
Kilcoy Homestead was listed on the Queensland Heritage Register on 21 October 1992 having satisfied the following criteria.

The place is important in demonstrating the evolution or pattern of Queensland's history.

Kilcoy Homestead is significant to Queensland history because it is one of the oldest surviving homesteads in the Brisbane Valley, and in Queensland. Built c. 1857 for a prominent Queensland pioneer, the Hon. Louis Hope, MLC, it has a close connection with 19th-century Queensland pastoral development, and in particular with the growth of the pastoral industry in the Brisbane Valley.

The place demonstrates rare, uncommon or endangered aspects of Queensland's cultural heritage.

Kilcoy Homestead is significant because it is a rare, well-preserved, substantial, late 1850s brick homestead, illustrating a class of buildings which were rare in Queensland at the time of construction, and are even more rare now.

The place is important in demonstrating the principal characteristics of a particular class of cultural places.

In its use of local hand-made bricks and timber from the property, Kilcoy Homestead is illustrative both of the constraints placed upon early Queensland pioneers in their attempts to "civilise" their bush environment, and of the means and methods adopted to overcome these constraints.

The place is important because of its aesthetic significance.

Kilcoy Homestead, an example of an 1850s residence reflecting a strong Georgian design influence, together with its dramatic siting and stand of mature trees, imbues a sense of landmark in the surrounding landscape. The simple detailing and interior finishes of the homestead expresses quality of design and workmanship.

The place has a special association with the life or work of a particular person, group or organisation of importance in Queensland's history.

Since 1922 it has been associated with the Kennedy family and their long-standing contribution to the Brisbane Valley community.
