= Stephen Simpson (doctor) =

Australian politician

The Hon Dr Stephen Simpson JP
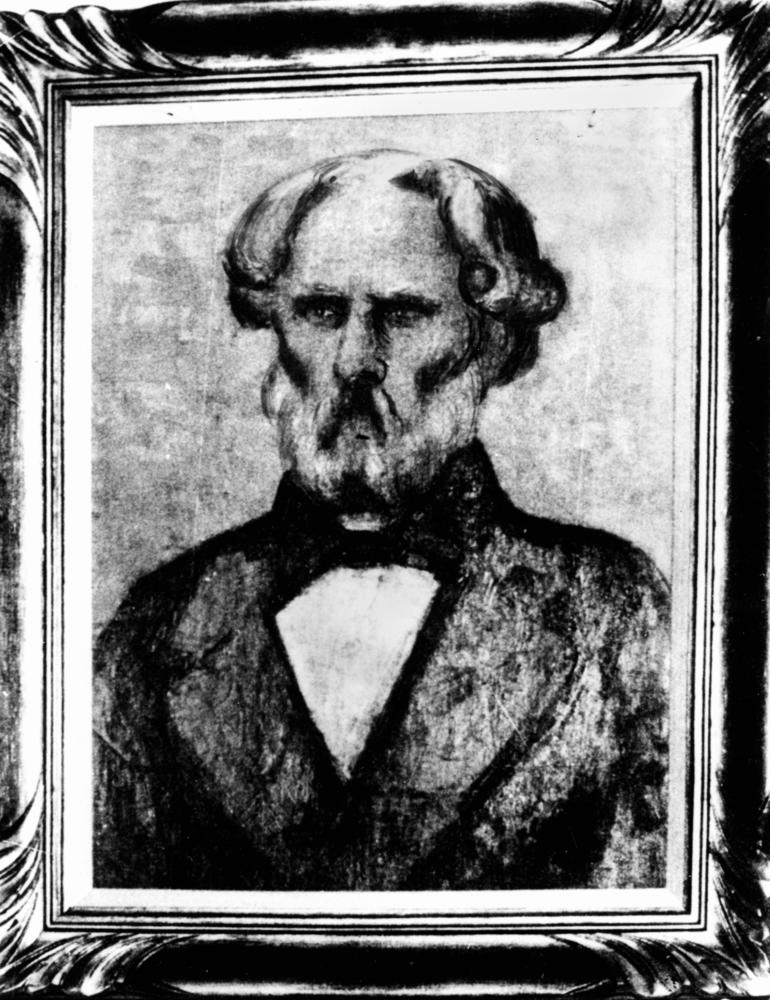

Member of the Queensland Legislative Council
- In office 23 May 1860 – 3 February 1865

Personal details
- Born: Stephen Simpson; 29 July 1793 Wolston, Warwickshire, England
- Died: 1 March 1869 (aged 75) Marylebone, London, England
- Spouse: Sophia Anne Simpson (m.1838 d.1840)
- Occupation: Surgeon, Homoeopathic practitioner, Police magistrate

Stephen Simpson (1793–1869) was a medical doctor and civil servant in Queensland, Australia. He was a founding Member of the Queensland Legislative Council.

== Early life ==
Stephen Simpson was born on 29 July 1793 in Wolston, Warwickshire, England, the son of Thomas Simpson and his wife Anne (née Bank).

From 1813 to 1817 he was a soldier with the 4th Light Dragoons. After that he studied medicine in Edinburgh. He became interested in homeopathy.

== Queensland years ==
Simpson immigrated to Queensland, arriving first in Sydney on the Wilmot and then arriving in Moreton Bay in July 1840.

Stephen Simpson was appointed Commissioner for Crown Lands for the Moreton Bay District in 1842 when the area was first opened up for free settlement following the closure of the penal colony. He was a doctor of medicine, a Justice of the Peace, a police magistrate and a founding Member of the Queensland Legislative Council following separation from New South Wales.

Simpson established a Border Police Station on Woogaroo Creek/Brisbane River in early 1843. He travelled throughout the Moreton Bay area for his work, part of which involved local Aboriginal people. His border police were involved in the Battle of One Tree Hill.

In March to April 1843 he undertook an exploration of the Bunya Country in the Wide Bay district.

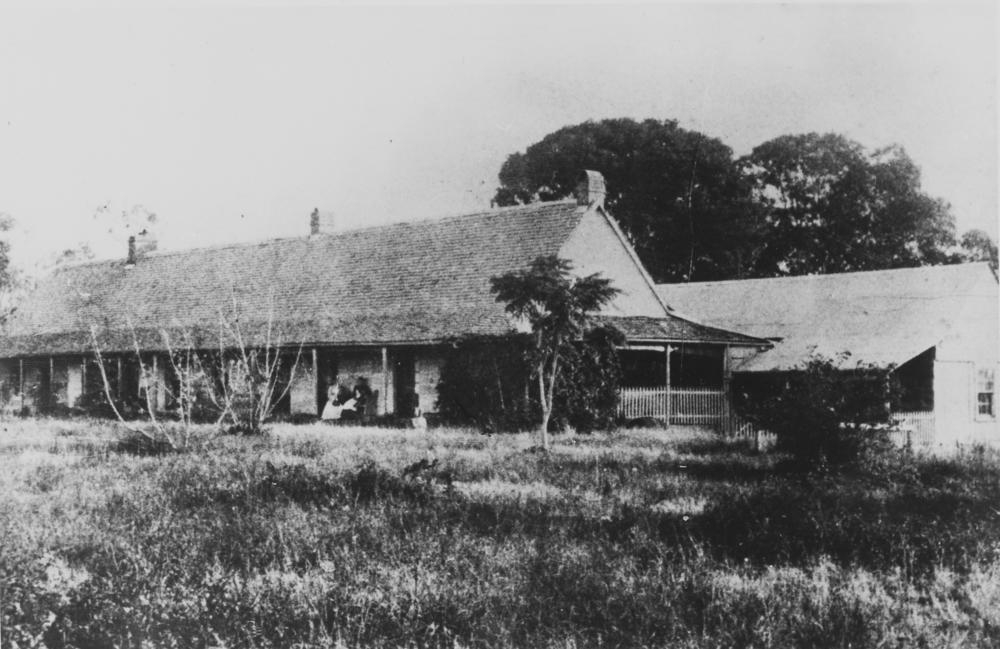
Wolston House, now in the suburb of Wacol, 1890

After first living at Eagle Farm then at Petrie's Bight, Simpson established his first cottage at Woogaroo (now Goodna), situated between Brisbane and Ipswich on what was to become the site of the Wolston Park Hospital. In 1851, when the opportunity to buy land in the area arose, he purchased 640 acres (2.6 km^{2}) to the east of his first house on land overlooking the Brisbane River. There he constructed a two-room brick cottage over a sandstone basement. The house was shingled and had a detached kitchen. This cottage now forms the core of the heritage-listed Wolston House.

Simpson had designated his nephew, John Ommaney (for whom Mount Ommaney is named) as his heir. On 11 March 1856 the young man was riding from Wolston station and was thrown from his horse. The horse returned to Wolston and a search was undertaken. Ommaney was found on the ground insensible and, despite medical attention, died. His body was taken by steamer to be buried in the Church of England cemetery at Paddington. This may have affected Simpson's commitment to remaining in the colony and a few years later, he put the Wolston estate up for sale and returned to England. According to the auction notice which appeared in the Moreton Bay Courier of 3 January 1860 the estate was by then well established with 2,000 acres (8.1 km^{2}) of fenced land, an extensive garden and orchards and 250 head of horses and 400 of cattle.

== Later life ==
Although appointed on 23 May 1860 as a life member of the Queensland Legislative Council, Simpson attended only once before he travelled to England. He was granted a leave of absence from the Council until September 1864. However, Simpson never returned to Queensland and resigned from the Council on 3 February 1865.

Simpson died on Thursday 11 March 1869 at 28 Bryanston Street, Portman Square, Marylebone, London.
