= 99th (Lanarkshire) Regiment of Foot =

- Active: 20 September 1824 – 1 July 1881
- Country: United Kingdom
- Branch: British Army
- Type: Infantry
- Role: Line Infantry
- Size: Battalion
- Garrison/HQ: Le Marchant Barracks, Devizes
- Nicknames: "Queen's Pets", "The Nines"
- March: "Blue Bonnets Over The Border" (traditional)(quick) "Auld Robin Grey" (slow)
- Engagements: New Zealand Wars; War of Southern Queensland; Second Opium War; Anglo-Zulu War

The 99th (Lanarkshire) Regiment of Foot was an infantry regiment of the British Army, formed in 1824. It amalgamated with the 62nd (Wiltshire) Regiment of Foot to form the Duke of Edinburgh's (Wiltshire Regiment) in 1881.

== History ==
=== Formation ===
The regiment was raised in Edinburgh by Major-General Gage John Hall as the 99th Regiment of Foot, in response to the threat posed by the French intervention in Spain, in March 1824. It was a distinct unit, unrelated to earlier units designated as the 99th Regiment of the British Army. In 1832, the new 99th Regiment received its county title, becoming the 99th (Lanarkshire) Regiment of Foot.

=== The Victorian era ===
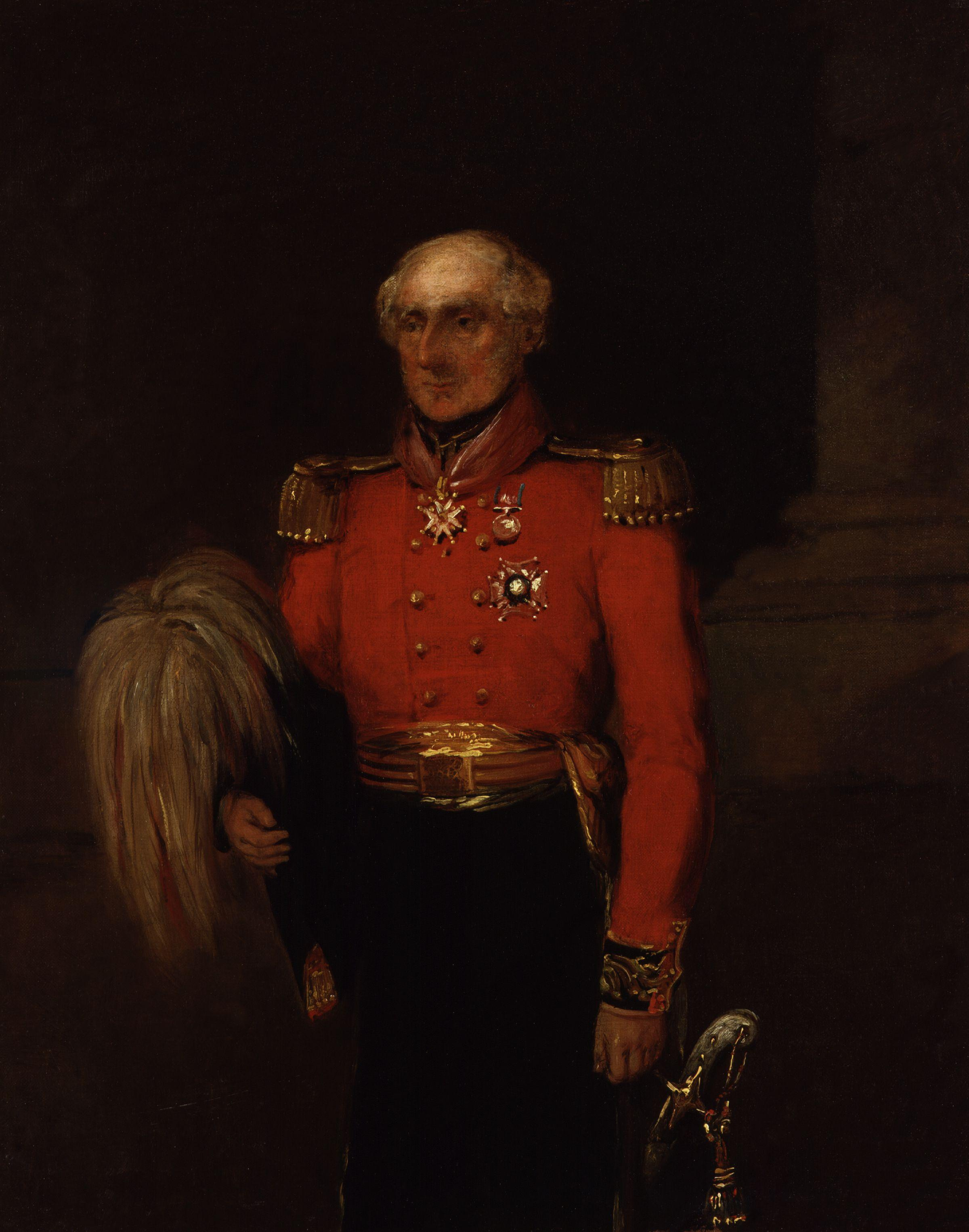
General Sir Colin Campbell, colonel of the regiment in the 1830s, by William Salter

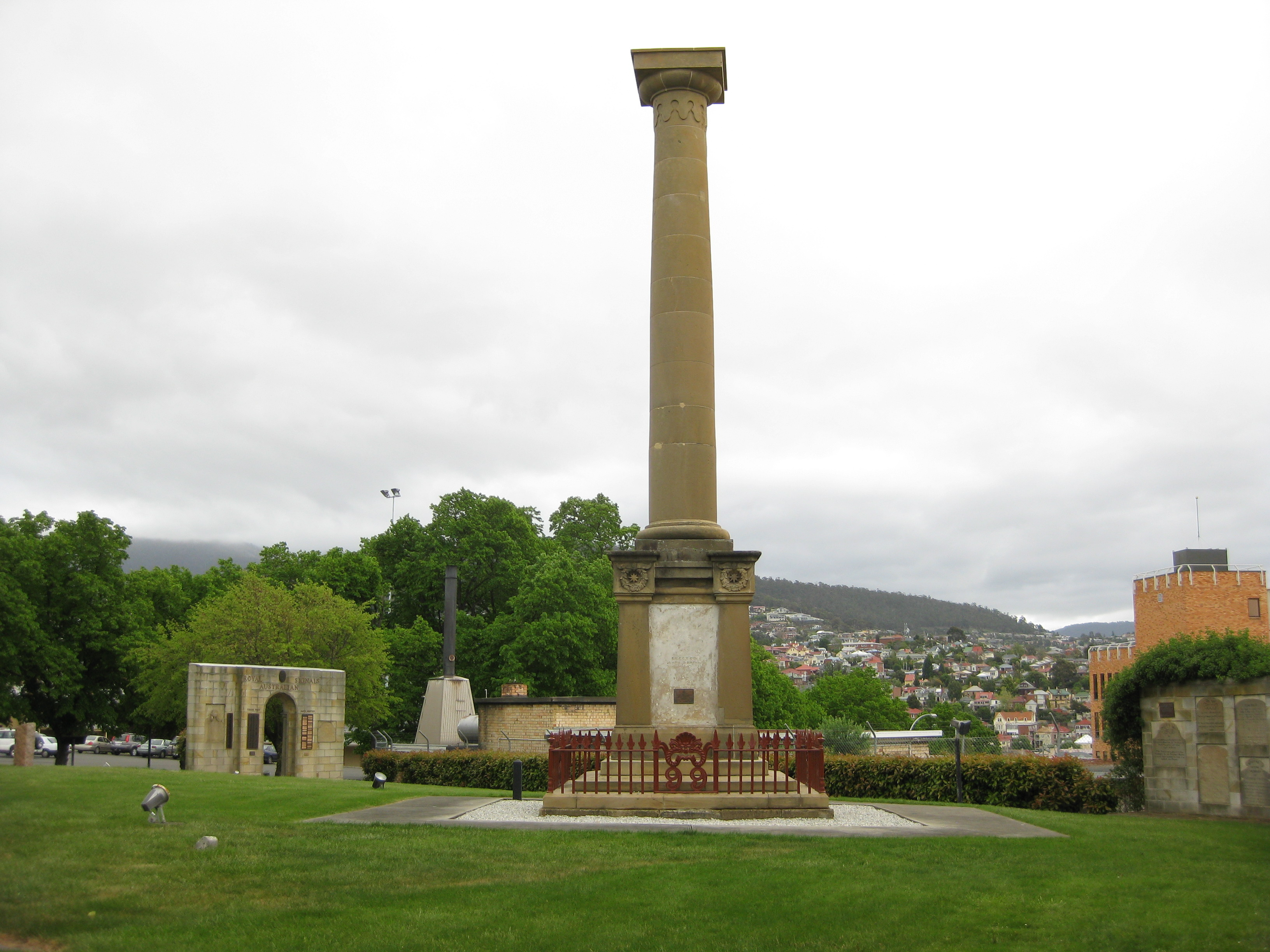
A memorial erected by the 99th Regiment of Foot at Anglesea Barracks, Hobart to commemorate the soldiers of the regiment killed during the New Zealand Wars. This is the only monument built by British soldiers in Australia to commemorate their casualties.

During its early years, the 99th spent much of its time in the Pacific. The first detachments of the 99th Regiment arrived in Australia with transported convicts aboard the transport ship North Briton, destined for Tasmania, in 1842. The rest of the 99th arrived on with successive shipments of convicts. The 99th rotated through various colonial posts during much of 1842 until being ordered to Sydney, Australia. However, the 99th soon earned an unsavory reputation, alienating the locals to such an extent that an additional regiment had to be assigned to Sydney. The 11th Regiment of Foot's principal job was keeping the men of the 99th under control.

A detachment of the 99th saw action during the War of Southern Queensland, taking part in attacks against the United Tribes in the Upper Brisbane–Lockyer campaign, and were later in the assault on York's Hollow in 1846.

The 99th remained in Tasmania for three years before being dispatched to New Zealand to take part in the New Zealand Wars. Detachments of the 99th took part in the Hutt Valley Campaign, seeing action at the Battle of Battle Hill. Three government soldiers and at least nine Ngāti Toa were killed. Following the capture of Te Rauparaha in 1846, the Regiment would depart New Zealand and return to Australia, although detachments would be sent as needed to reinforce the British forces in New Zealand for the next few years to keep the peace. For its service in the First Maori War, the regiment earned its first battle honour: New Zealand.

In 1856, the regiment rotated back to the British Isles. The 99th spent its next two years at various garrisons in Ireland, until in 1858, it was ordered to join the Aldershot garrison. While at Aldershot, the regiment earned its reputation as an extraordinarily well drilled and well turned out regiment.

Following its tour of duty at Aldershot, the regiment rotated to India in 1859. After serving at various Indian stations, the 99th was called to active service to form part of General Sir Hope Grant's force during the Second Opium War. Assigned to the 2nd Division, commanded by Major-General Sir Robert Napier, the 99th took part in the Third Battle of Taku Forts and the Battle of Palikao. The regiment also participated in the sack of Peking, where among the loot carried off, the regiment took a Pekinese dog which belonged to the Chinese Empress. The dog, named Lootie, was taken back to England where it was presented to the Queen Victoria. For its service in China, the regiment earned the battle honour: Pekin 1860. Rather than return the 99th to India, the regiment was ordered to join the Hong Kong garrison, securing the new Kowloon territory acquired by the Convention of Peking.

The regiment remained as the Hong Kong garrison until 1865, but found themselves in trouble in autumn 1864, with eleven of their number on trial for murder and riot following serious altercations, first with a party of Malay seaman, and then the local police. Three days of mayhem left eight men dead, including Private Landale of the regiment, and the 99th Foot were immediately sent to Kowloon and with the local Volunteers taking up picket duties on HKI. In November, the eleven were put on trial but acquitted. However, the 99th were posted out of Hong Kong, and in early February 1865, they were replaced by 9th (the East Norfolks). The 99th boarded HMS Tamar - which had delivered the 9th - bound Cape Town.

From 1865 until 1868, the 99th served in South Africa. While in South Africa, Prince Alfred, the Duke of Edinburgh, inspected the regiment as part of a tour of the colony. The regiment impressed him so much that he took a continued interest in the regiment for the rest of his life. This culminated in permission being granted to re-title the regiment. In 1874, the 99th (Lanarkshire) Regiment of Foot became the 99th Duke of Edinburgh's (Lanarkshire) Regiment of Foot, taking its title from Prince Alfred, Duke of Edinburgh. After returning to England in 1868, the regiment returned to South Africa in 1878 in time to take part in the Anglo-Zulu War.

Assigned to Lord Chelmsford's column, they marched to the relief of British forces under Colonel Charles Pearson besieged by the Zulu impis. At the Battle of Gingindlovu, the 99th helped defeat a Zulu impis which tried to overrun the British while laagered. Although it would not participate in the final battle at Ulundi, the 99th was honoured for its service in Anglo-Zulu War, being awarded the battle honour South Africa 1879.

=== Amalgamation ===
As part of the Cardwell Reforms of the 1870s, where single-battalion regiments were linked together to share a single depot and recruiting district in the United Kingdom, the 99th was linked with the 62nd (Wiltshire) Regiment of Foot, and assigned to district no. 38 at Le Marchant Barracks in Devizes. On 1 July 1881 the Childers Reforms came into effect and the regiment amalgamated with the 62nd (Wiltshire) Regiment of Foot to form the Duke of Edinburgh's (Wiltshire Regiment).

== Battle honours ==
New Zealand Wars, Pekin 1860, South Africa 1879

== Colonels of the Regiment ==
Colonels of the Regiment were:

- 1824–1832: Gen. Gage John Hall
- 1832–1834: Lt-Gen. Sir Thomas Reynell, Bt., KCB
- 1834–1836: Lt-Gen. Sir Colin Campbell, KCB
- 1836–1839: Lt-Gen. Sir Thomas Arbuthnot, KCB
- 1839–1841: F.M. Sir Hugh Gough, 1st Viscount Gough, KP, GCB, GCSI
- 1841–1851: Gen. Sir Howard Douglas, Bt., GCB, GCMG
- 1851–1863: Gen. Sir John Hanbury, KCB, KCH
- 1863–1866: Maj-Gen. John Napper Jackson
- 1866–1880: Gen. Samuel Braybrooke
- 1880–1881: Gen. Sir Henry James Warre, KCB
