= Kooroongarra, Queensland =

Kooroongarra
- Town
- Interactive map of Kooroongarra
- Coordinates: 28.1005°S 151.2538°E
- Country: Australia
- State: Queensland
- LGA: Toowoomba Region
- Location: 27.6 km (17.1 mi) S of Millmerran; 106 km (66 mi) SW of Toowoomba; 242 km (150 mi) WSW of Brisbane

Government
  - State electorate: Southern Downs
  - Federal division: Maranoa

Area
  - Total: 116.5 km^{2} (45.0 sq mi)

Population
  - Total: 45 (2021 census)
  - Density: 0.386/km^{2} (1.000/sq mi)
- Time zone: UTC+10:00 (AEST)
- Postcode: 4357
Localities around Kooroongarra
Millwood	Clontarf; Lavelle	Mount Emlyn; Rocky Creek
Bringalily	Kooroongarra	Stonehenge
Canning Creek	Canning Creek	Stonehenge

Kooroongarra is a rural town and locality in the Toowoomba Region, Queensland, Australia. In the 2021 census, the locality of Kooroongarra had a population of 45 people.

== History ==
Kooroongarra South Provisional School opened on 10 August 1891. On 1 January 1909, it became Kooroongarra South State School. It closed in 1967. It was at approx 2325 Kooroongarra Road (28.0995°S 151.2557°E).

St Mark's Presbyterian Church opened on 3 September 1897 in Kooroongarra Road (28.0995°S 151.2530°E). It was consecrated on 5 May 1968. It became St Mark's Uniting Church on 22 June 1977. It was deconsecrated on 5 December 1999. It was later relocated to the Millmerran Museum at 17 Mary Street, Millmerran.

St Alban's Anglican church was dedicated in 1907. Its closure was approved by Assistant Bishop Rob Nolan. It was at 2385 Kooroongarra Road (28.1031°S 151.2531°E); it has been sold and converted into a house.

The town name changed from South Koorongara to Koorongara in 1977 and then the spelling was altered to Kooroongarra in 2000. The name is derived from Aboriginal words, kooroon meaning resting place for birds and garra meaning water.

== Demographics ==
In the 2016 census, the locality of Kooroongarra had a population of 58 people.

In the 2021 census, the locality of Kooroongarra had a population of 45 people.

== Education ==
There are no schools in Kooroongarra. The nearest government primary schools are Leyburn State School in Leyburn to the north-east and Millmerran State School in Millmerran to the north. The nearest government secondary school is Millmerran State School which offers secondary schooling to Year 10. There are no nearby schools offering secondary education to Year 12; distance education and boarding schools are the alternatives.

== See also ==
- List of schools in Darling Downs
