= Punchs Creek =

- Suburb
- Interactive map of Punchs Creek
- Coordinates: 27.9833°S 151.4°E
- Country: Australia
- State: Queensland
- LGA: Toowoomba Region
- Location: 28.8 km (17.9 mi) SE of Millmerran; 67.3 km (41.8 mi) SW of Pittsworth; 98.8 km (61.4 mi) SW of Toowoomba CBD; 236 km (147 mi) WSW of Brisbane

Government
  - State electorate: Southern Downs
  - Federal division: Maranoa

Area
  - Total: 101.4 km^{2} (39.2 sq mi)

Population
  - Total: 35 (2021 census)
  - Density: 0.345/km^{2} (0.894/sq mi)
- Time zone: UTC+10:00 (AEST)
- Postcode: 4357
Suburbs around Punchs Creek
| Millmerran | Yandilla | Tummaville |
| Grays Gate | Punchs Creek | Tummaville |
| Rocky Creek | Stonehenge | Stonehenge |

Punchs Creek is a rural locality in the Toowoomba Region, Queensland, Australia. In the 2021 census, Punchs Creek had a population of 35 people.

== Geography ==
The creek Punch Creek enters the locality from the south (Stonehenge) and exits to the north (Tummaville).

The land use is crop growing with some grazing on native vegetation.

== History ==
The locality is presumably named after the creek, which, in turn, was named after a horse in William John Castle's horse team.

Punch's Creek Provisional School opened on 1 February 1897. It closed on 31 December 1901 due to low student numbers.

== Demographics ==
In the 2016 census, Punchs Creek had a population of 43 people.

In the 2021 census, Punchs Creek had a population of 35 people.

== Education ==
There are no schools in Punchs Creek. The nearest government primary schools are Millmerran State School in neighbouring Millmerran to the north-west, Leyburn State School in Leyburn to the east, and Brookstead State School in Brookstead to the north. The nearest government secondary schools are Millmerran State School (to Year 10) and Pittsworth State High School (to Year 12) in Pittsworth to the north-east. However, Pittsworth State High School may be too distant for some students in southern Punchs Creek for a daily commute; the alternatives are distance education and boarding school.

There is also a Catholic primary school in Millmerran.
