= All Saints Anglican Church, Yandilla =

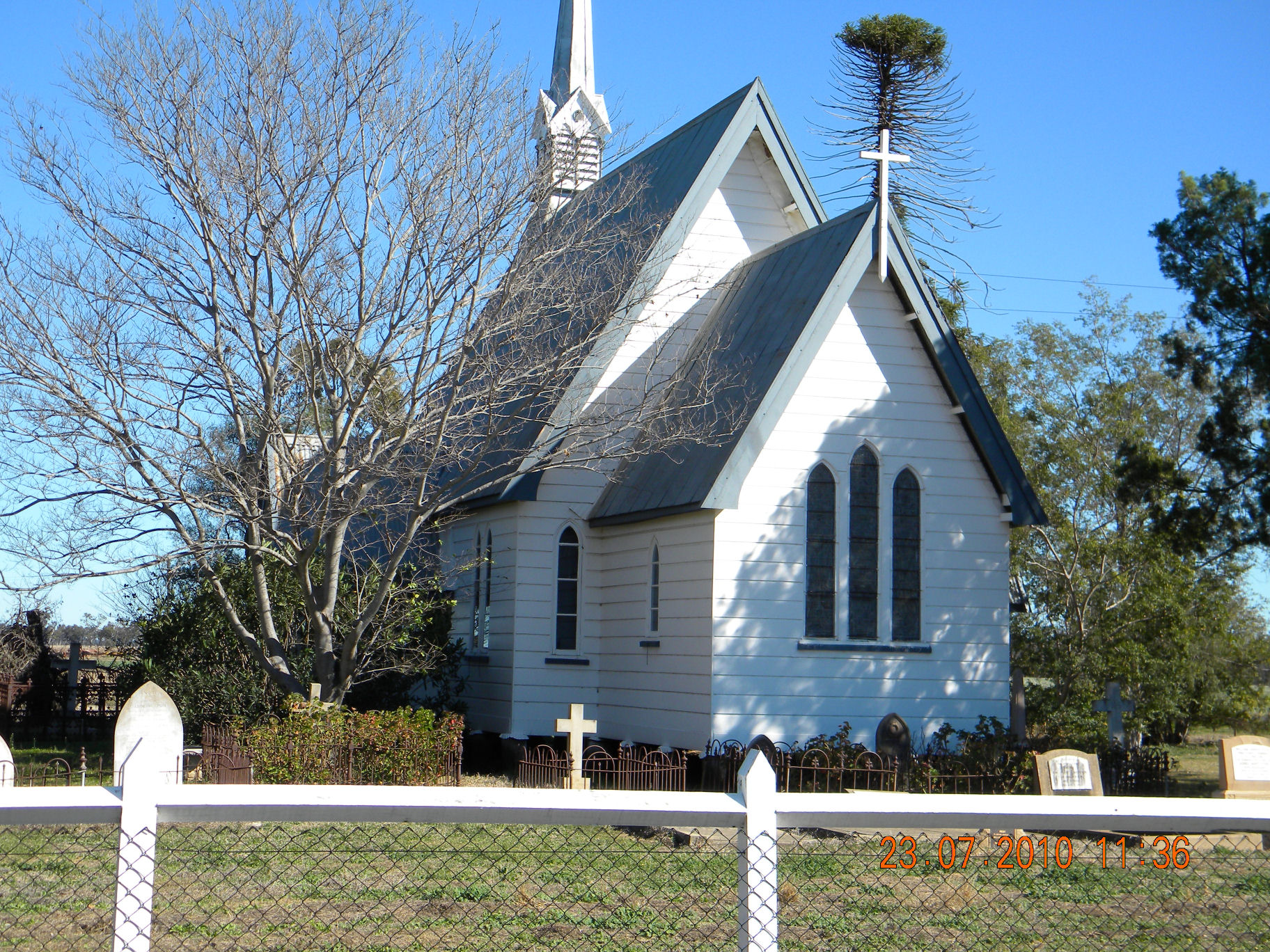
- All Saints Anglican Church, 2010

- Location within Queensland Location within Australia
- 27.828°S 151.3504°E
- Location: Gore Highway, Yandilla, Toowoomba Region, Queensland, Australia

History
- Built: 1878

Queensland Heritage Register
- Official name: All Saints Anglican Church and cemetery Yandilla, All Saints Church of England
- Type: state heritage (built, landscape)
- Designated: 21 October 1992
- Reference no.: 600722
- Significant period: 1860s–1880s (historical); 1860s–1920s (fabric) ongoing (social)
- Significant components: stained glass window/s, grave surrounds/railings, tower – bell / belfry, memorial/monument, fencing, headstone, graveyard, spire, church, cemetery, pipe organ, furniture/fittings
- Builders: John Baillie

All Saints Anglican Church and cemetery Yandilla is a heritage-listed Anglican church at Gore Highway, Yandilla, Toowoomba Region, Queensland, Australia. It was built about 1878 by John Baillie. It is also known as All Saints Church of England. It was added to the Queensland Heritage Register on 21 October 1992.

== History ==
All Saints Church is a timber church erected at Yandilla Station by the Gore family about 1878 on the site of an earlier church, which it closely resembles. The graveyard around the church is believed to have been established in 1863 supplanting the previous custom of burial close to the homestead.

The Gores were from a family of Irish landowners. They came out to Australia as a family, largely for reasons of health, following the death of their father, a clergyman, and the youngest son. Another son, William, became the Rector of All Saints Parramatta, while Ralph and St George Gore travelled to the Darling Downs in 1841 with sheep purchased from the Macarthurs. They established a run at Grasstree Creek, later known as Yandilla, and were joined soon after by brothers, Robert and St John and their wives. St George sold out his share in 1846 and took up Bodumba and Canning Creek. Later St George became a member for Warwick in the first Queensland Legislative Assembly and the first Minister for Lands. In 1846 Tummaville station adjoining Yandilla was acquired by the Gores.

The family were devout Anglicans and had a paternalistic sense of responsibility towards the welfare of their workers, there being a considerable number of people living on Yandilla apart from the Gores. Pastoral stations provided accommodation for workers and facilities such as a store, blacksmiths and other trades essential for running a station in an isolated area. In 1843, the visiting Commissioner for Crown Lands reported that 30 people were in residence and a woolshed and 11 huts had been built. At the time, Yandilla was part of a parish which extended in theory from the Hawkesbury River to Cape York Peninsula. Visits by a minister were rare and irregular, the first service at Yandilla is thought to have been in 1843. The first itinerant minister for the Darling Downs was the energetic pioneer clergyman Reverend Benjamin Glennie. His first visit to Yandilla was on 28 August 1848. From 1850 he was based at Drayton and visited Yandilla regularly. At the same time, a Sunday School was conducted by the ladies of Yandilla for children living on the station. There is thought to have been a chapel there from the earliest days though this may have been part of the homestead.

Reverend William Gore had visited Yandilla from time to time and conducted services during his visits. In 1860 he bought into the family firm and eventually became the major shareholder. The "village" at the station by then had over 100 inhabitants and a new church was built close to the homestead in 1863. It was described in the Darling Downs Gazette as:

being of sawn timber and the dimensions 30 feet by 20 feet, with a very little chancel and porch attached. The roof is an equilateral triangle and has a very fine effect. A splendid stained glass window is being prepared and is intended to be placed in the eastern end of the building

In 1861, a minister had been appointed to serve 8 stations in the area, but the first service was held by Reverend Gore, who seems to have held services when the regular minister was not available. The church was, however, used by workers of all religious denominations on the station. Catholic services were held there from 1862 and Presbyterian services from 1891.

The present church was built in 1878, during the management of William Gore's eldest son Francis, who ran the property from 1866 until his death in 1904 and who was deeply involved in local and pastoral affairs, serving on a wide range of boards and committees. During this period large sections of pastoral runs were resumed for selection and this increased settlement in the area, some selectors having previously been station employees. This church is on the same site and echoes the plan and form of its predecessor, so that it may well contain some shared material. The work was undertaken by local carpenter and Yandilla storekeeper John Baillie, who is thought to have also built the courthouse and St Augustine's church at Leyburn. Baillie reputedly received assistance from station workers and from Aborigines living on Yandilla at the time.

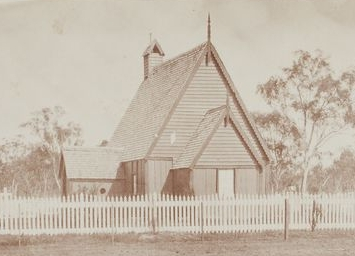
Church, 1878

The Reverend Gore died in 1885 and on 15 November 1887 the church and graveyard were consecrated as All Saints Church of England at the request of Francis, Gerard and Robert Gore. On this day Madame Blumenthal, formerly Leonie Gore, and a major shareholder in Yandilla, presented 3 stained glass windows to the church. They were made in England at a cost of £600 in memory of her uncle, Reverend William Gore. These were placed in the chancel of the church on the condition that the church was consecrated by the Church of England and that all burials in the churchyard were conducted by an Anglican minister. However, Catholic services were still held at All Saints and were financially supported by Mme Blumenthal.

The church provided services for more than the Yandilla residents and during the shearing season many shearers and seasonal workers attended. These were people whose itinerant work made it hard for them to attend church services and in 1888 a special Christmas service was held for them. In this year a pipe organ which had been made by the Rev Gore was installed. It was built of oak from a tree at Feniton Court, a Gore family home in Devon, England. At about this time two heavily carved oak chairs with reading desks were installed. One is believed to have been made in Florence and the other a copy made in 1886 by John Baillie.

In 1890 a professional gardener from London, Hartley Moore, was appointed to care for the grounds of the homestead and developed beautiful gardens around it. He also acted as caretaker and churchwarden, during which time he planted shrubs and kept the church grounds in good order.

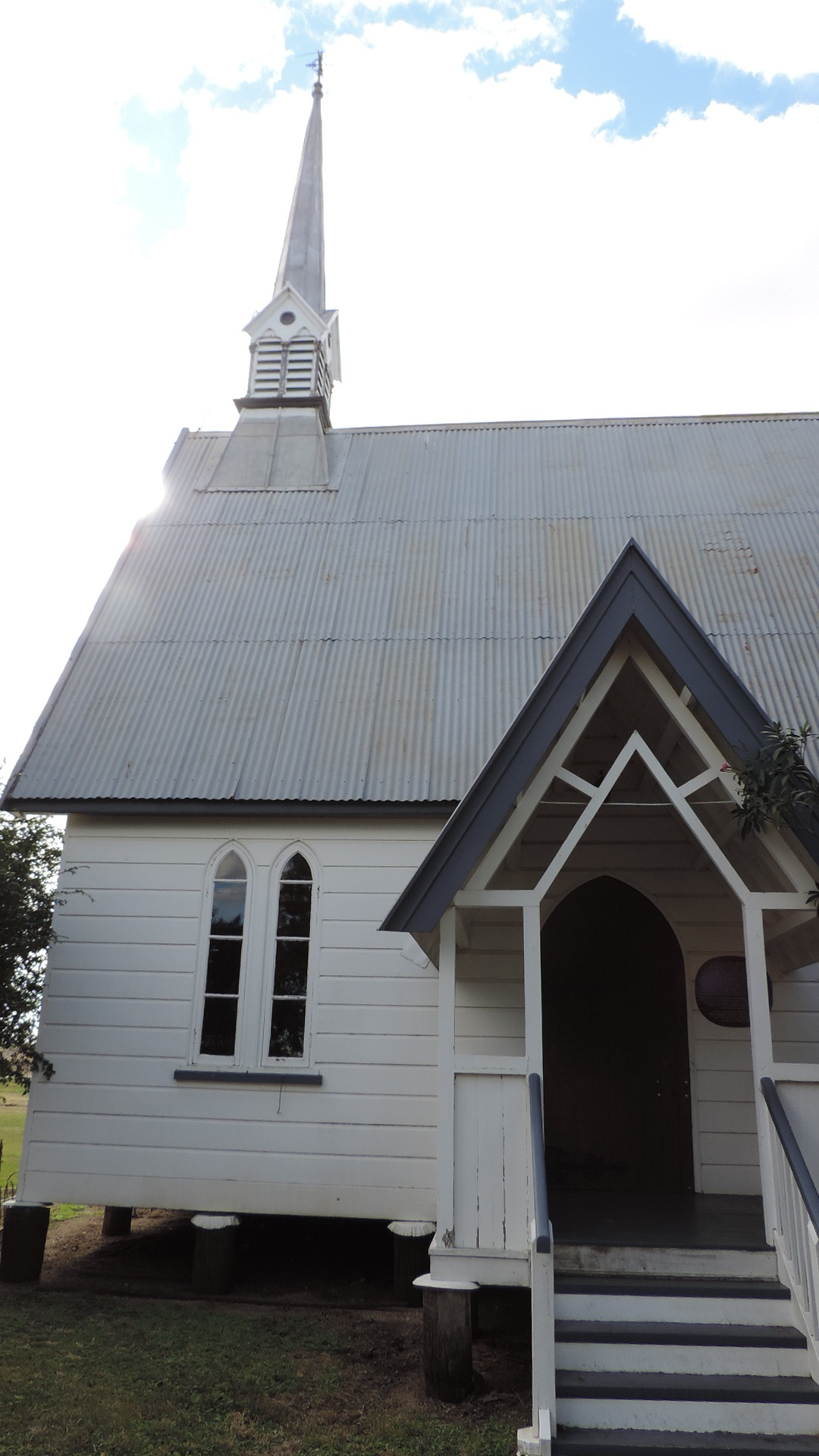
Entrance porch and steeple, 2015

Although the congregation dwindled due to a decline in the industry and the building of other churches in the area, a new spire and belfry were erected and a bell was imported from America. in 1900. In the early 1900s plans were made to subdivide Yandilla and to sell it piecemeal. In 1906 it was sold to the Lomax Pastoral Company. In 1910 a new vestry was added to the church and in 1913 a stone font carved was placed in the church in memory of Gerard Gore who had died the year before. He had been the churchwarden for many years and continued to provide financial support, though living in Melbourne. £1100 was also given to the Synod of the Church in his memory so that the interest could be used to assist All Saints. In 1914 the organ made by Reverend William Gore was sold and replaced by a smaller one.

The congregation declined over the years and in 1919 a fire destroyed the Yandilla station office taking with it the records pertaining to the church and cemetery. In 1923 the church enjoyed something of a revival when the Reverend T Bird became the minister to Millmerran and Yandilla and John (Jack) Rademy was appointed manager of Yandilla by new owners William Naughton & Co. Rademy and his wife were active in church affairs and continued their support of the church, even after purchasing another property in the district. In 1924 the parish of Millmerran was formed with services held at Millmerran, Yandilla, and Leyburn. In 1925 new brasses and hangings were installed in the church. In 1936 the Cowlishaw family took over Yandilla and took an interest in the church, maintaining its links with the property.

Other later work includes an altar presented in 1957 by Mrs Hazel Fysh of Pampas. In 1958, fourteen of the oldest headstones were renovated by Bruce Bros monumental masons of Toowoomba. Around c. 1968 the main Toowoomba to Goondiwindi road (now the Gore Highway) was relocated to pass close to the church between it and the homestead site. Any remaining trees from the pine avenue which connected the church with the homestead are thought to have vanished at this time. None of the homestead buildings have survived and the church was the oldest building in the Shire of Millmerran (amalgamated in 2008 into the Toowoomba Region). The Gore family still retain an interest in the church with family reunions and christenings being held there in recent times. In 1970, a new Deed of Grant was issued to the Anglican Church for the area containing the church and graveyard. In 1975 All Saints was listed on the Register of the National Estate. In 1988 a cairn was unveiled in memory of the Gore family as a bicentennial project by the Tummaville branch of the Queensland Country Women's Association.

== Description ==
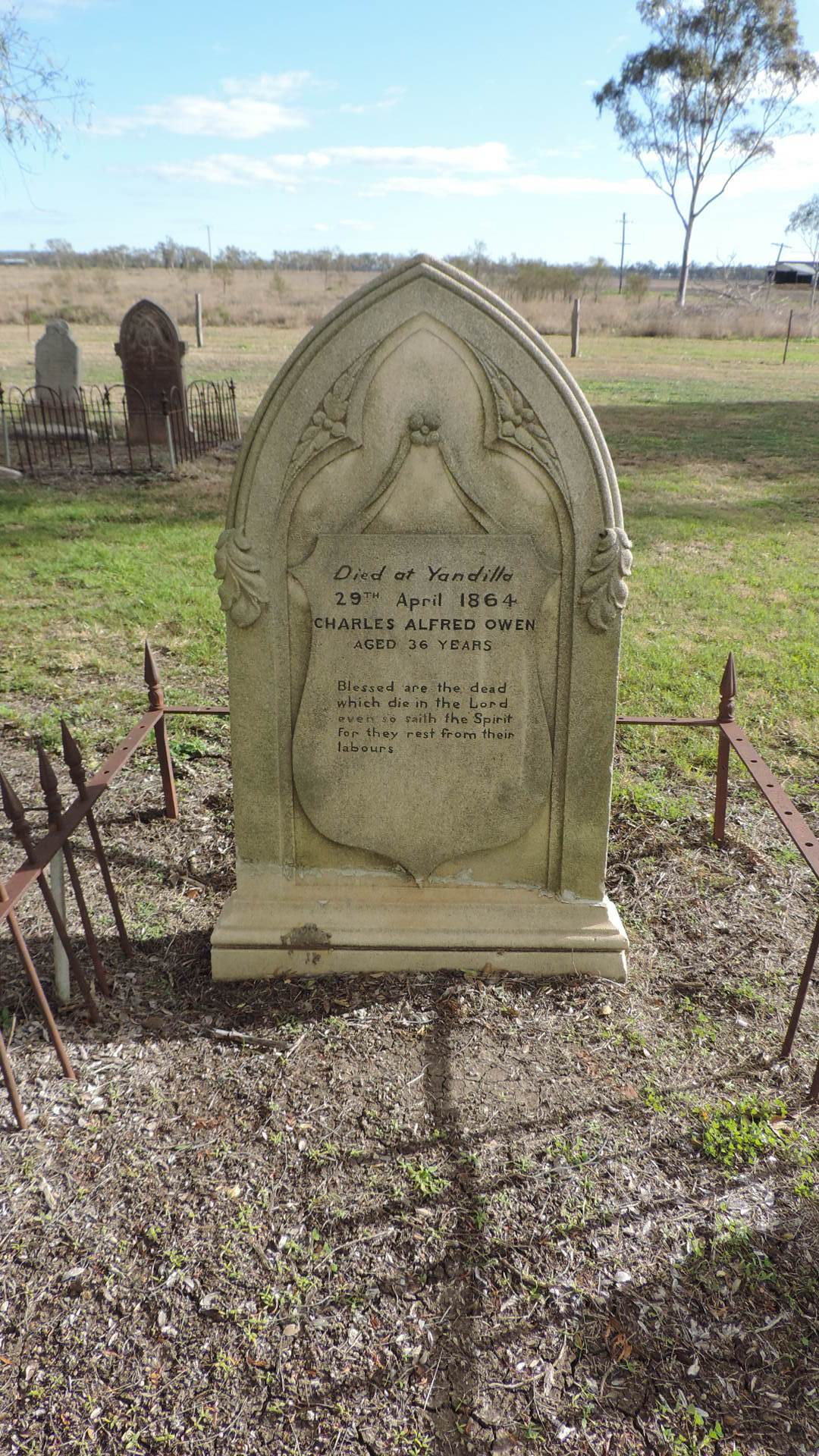
Headstone of Charles Alfred Owen, died 1864

Located on the road between Toowoomba to Millmerran, All Saints church is highly visible in a flat landscape. It is a Gothic influenced timber building on low stumps clad with pit sawn weatherboards. The roof is steeply pitched, clad with corrugated iron and topped by a louvred belfry and slender spire at the western end. It is painted white outside, as it originally was. The church is entered by a porch on the southern side of the building. On the northern side is a small vestry sheeted in vertical timber boards. The interior is oiled timber and is lit by plain lancet windows, with a set of three lancets windows set with stained glass in the chancel. This is connected to the eastern end of the church through a Gothic arch and is visually separated from the main body of the church by its smaller scale. The stained glass windows in memory of Reverend William Gore are above the altar and depict Christ the King. Two oak prayer desks and chairs heavily carved with cherubs, lions etc. are set on either side of the chancel. The church is otherwise simply furnished.

There are 95 burials ranged around the church dating between 1864 and 1982. The earliest burial is that of Yandilla manager and partner, Charles Owen, who was murdered at Owen's Scrub, Yandilla on 29 April 1864. Some of the graves have railings and memorials include the work of masons R.C. Ziegler, Bruce Brothers, J.H. Wagner and Bailey (Toowoomba). The most elaborate grave, which has ornate ironwork, is that of Harriet Gore, wife of Francis Gore. There are some mature trees in the grounds, including a bunya pine. The churchyard is surrounded by a simple post and top rail fence.

== Heritage listing ==
All Saints Anglican Church and cemetery Yandilla was listed on the Queensland Heritage Register on 21 October 1992 having satisfied the following criteria.

The place is important in demonstrating the evolution or pattern of Queensland's history.

The church demonstrates the pattern of Queensland history by providing evidence for the way in which early pastoral runs were run as small communities. Yandilla, established in 1841 by the Gores, an important pioneer pastoral family on the Darling Downs, had a "village" complete with a school and church. The church, its memorials and the graves of family, employees and early selectors which surround it are now the only visible evidence of this settlement.

The place is important in demonstrating the principal characteristics of a particular class of cultural places.

All Saints is a good and early example of a church and accompanying graveyard, an arrangement common in Europe, but much less so in Queensland.

The place is important because of its aesthetic significance.

The church building itself and the stained glass and furnishings of the interior have considerable aesthetic appeal.

The place has a strong or special association with a particular community or cultural group for social, cultural or spiritual reasons.

The church has a long association with the local community and the graveyard contains the burials of pioneers of the area.

The place has a special association with the life or work of a particular person, group or organisation of importance in Queensland's history.

The building itself, the family memorials it contains and the burials in the churchyard have a strong association with the Gore family who were important in the establishment of the pastoral industry on the Downs and in the early political life of Queensland.

== See also ==
- Anglican Diocese of Brisbane
- Anglo-Catholicism
- Liberal Anglo-Catholicism
- High church
- Ritualism in the Church of England
- Anti-Protestantism
- Progressive Christianity
- Liberal Christianity
