= Mosquito Creek, Queensland =

Mosquito Creek
- Suburb
- Interactive map of Mosquito Creek
- Coordinates: 28.2633°S 151.2569°E
- Country: Australia
- State: Queensland
- LGA: Goondiwindi Region
- Location: 64.4 km (40.0 mi) S of Millmerran; 89.1 km (55.4 mi) WSW of Clifton; 91.2 km (56.7 mi) W of Warwick; 150 km (93 mi) ENE of Goondiwindi; 245 km (152 mi) ESE of Brisbane

Government
  - State electorate: Southern Downs
  - Federal division: Maranoa

Area
  - Total: 231.3 km^{2} (89.3 sq mi)
- Elevation: 310–624 m (1,017–2,047 ft)

Population
  - Total: 8 (2021 census)
  - Density: 0.0346/km^{2} (0.090/sq mi)
- Time zone: UTC+10:00 (AEST)
- Postcode: 4387
Suburbs around Mosquito Creek
Stonehenge	Stonehenge	Karara
Canning Creek	Mosquito Creek	Gore
Inglewood	Coolmunda	Oman Ama

Mosquito Creek is a rural locality in the Goondiwindi Region, Queensland, Australia. In the 2021 census, Mosquito Creek had a population of 8 people.

== Geography ==
The locality is bounded to the north-east by the ridgeline of the Herries Range (28.1554°S 151.4434°E). The elevation ranges from 310 to 624 metres (1,017 to 2,047 ft). above sea level with Mount Bodumba (28.2088°S 151.3740°E) at 624 metres (2,047 ft)

== History ==
St George Richard Gore registered a pastoral run under the name Mosquito Creek in 1847, which gave its name to the creek and then to the locality.

== Demographics ==
In the 2016 census, Mosquito Creek had a population of 17 people.

In the 2021 census, Mosquito Creek had a population of 8 people.

== Economy ==
There are a number of homesteads in the locality:

- Ballancar (28.2019°S 151.3382°E)
- Lonsdale (28.2095°S 151.3074°E)
- Mount Bodumba (28.2039°S 151.3247°E)
- Nyora (28.1699°S 151.3919°E)
- Paisley (28.2370°S 151.2635°E)

== Education ==
There are no schools in Mosquito Creek. The nearest government primary schools are Karara State School in neighbouring Karara to the north-east and Inglewood State School in neighbouring Inglewood to the south-west. The nearest government secondary schools are Inglewood State School in Inglewood and Millmerran State School in Millmerran to the north, but these schools only offer secondary schooling to Year 10. The nearest government secondary schools offering schooling to Year 12 are Clifton State High School in Clifton to the north-east and Warwick State High School in Warwick to the east, but they are sufficiently distant that distance education or boarding schools are other options.
