= Millmerran–Inglewood Road =

Road in Queensland, Australia

Millmerran–Inglewood Road Queensland

General information
- Type: Rural road
- Length: 68.8 km (43 mi)
- Route number(s): State Route 82 (Millmerran – Inglewood)

Major junctions
- North end: Gore Highway Millmerran
- Kooroongarra Road
- South end: Cunningham Highway Inglewood

Location(s)
- Major settlements: Millwood, Bringalily

Millmerran–Inglewood Road is a continuous 68.8-kilometre-long (42.8 mi) road route in the Toowoomba and Goondiwindi regions of Queensland, Australia. The road is signed as State Route 82. Millmerran–Inglewood Road (number 337) is a state-controlled regional road.

== Route description ==
The Millmerran–Inglewood Road commences at an intersection with the Gore Highway (A39) in Millmerran, just east of the CBD. It runs south-west between Millmerran and Domville before turning south through Clontarf, Millwood and Bringalily. Land use on this section is mainly crop farming. The road continues south through Canning Creek, where it passes through the Bringalily State Forest before re-entering open country as it approaches Inglewood, here it follows Canning Creek (the watercourse) to the south-west. It ends at an intersection with the Cunningham Highway just east of the Inglewood CBD.

The road passes two exits to Kooroongarra Road, which runs in a semi-circle through the localities of Grays Gate, Mount Emlyn and Kooroongarra.

== State Route 82 ==
State Route 82 follows a number of separately named roads from Tingoora (near Wondai) to Inglewood. It is not necessarily the best or the shortest or the quickest route between the two terminuses. It was proclaimed as a State Route because, at the time, it was the most convenient route for many users. It is also an example of why motorists in unfamiliar territory should follow a designated route rather than rely on a vehicle navigation system, which may direct them onto less suitable alternative roads.

The route follows Chinchilla–Wondai Road west from Tingoora to Durong, where it turns south to Jinghi. Here the Chinchilla–Wondai Road turns west, while State Route 82 continues south on Jandowae Connection Road to Jandowae. In Jandowae the road name changes to Dalby–Jandowae Road, which continues to the Warrego Highway in the west of Dalby. From there it follows the Warrego Highway to the south-east until it reaches Dalby–Cecil Plains Road, where it continues south.

At a T-junction in Cecil Plains, State Route 82 turns east on Toowoomba–Cecil Plains Road until it reaches Pampas–Horrane Road, (Note: Horrane was a station on the former Cecil Plains railway line. It was situated adjacent to the intersection of Toowoomba–Cecil Plains Road and Pampas–Horrane Road in the locality of Cecil Plains.) where it turns south. Note that many navigation systems will suggest a turn to the west in Cecil Plains, leading to Millmerran–Cecil Plains Road. State Route 82 follows Pampas–Horrane Road to Pampas, where it meets the Gore Highway at a T-junction. From there it follows the Gore Highway south-west to Millmerran, where it turns south on the Millmerran–Inglewood Road. This road continues south to Inglewood, where it meets the Cunningham Highway at a T-junction.

== History ==
Yandilla pastoral run was established in 1842. It was a huge lease of 690 square miles, which equates to 441,600 acres (178,700 ha). It included the area now occupied by Millmerran, and extended north to Kurrowah, just south of Cecil Plains. In 1881 part of Yandilla was selected for the town of Millmerran. The town developed quickly as the commercial centre for the district, with road connections to Dalby and Toowoomba.

Inglewood was settled in the 1860s and became a commercial centre for its district. In 1877, 112 square miles, which equates to 71,680 acres (29,010 ha) of Canning Creek station was opened for selection. This resulted in the development of small farms to the north of Bringalily State Forest, and a growing need for a road to Inglewood, the nearest town for many.

The outcome was the completion of a reliable road from Millmerran to Inglewood.

== Major intersections ==
All distances are from Google Maps.

LGA	Location	km	mi	Destinations	Notes
Toowoomba	Millmerran	0	0.0	Gore Highway (A39) – northeast – Pampas – southwest – Captains Mountain	Northern end of Millmerran–Inglewood Road. Road runs south as State Route 82.
Toowoomba	Millmerran / Domville midpoint	6.2	3.9	Kooroongarra Road – southeast – Grays Gate, Mount Emlyn	
Toowoomba	Bringalily	30.9	19.2	Kooroongarra Road – east – Kooroongarra	
Goondiwindi	Inglewood	68.8	42.8	Cunningham Highway – east – Coolmunda – west – Whetstone	Southern end of Millmerran–Inglewood Road
1.000 mi = 1.609 km; 1.000 km = 0.621 mi

== See also ==
- List of road routes in Queensland
- List of numbered roads in Queensland
