= Millwood, Queensland =

Millwood
- Suburb
- Interactive map of Millwood
- Coordinates: 28.0333°S 151.2°E
- Country: Australia
- State: Queensland
- LGA: Toowoomba Region
- Location: 19.5 km (12.1 mi) SSW of Millmerran; 48.7 km (30.3 mi) NNE of Inglewood; 101 km (63 mi) SW of Toowoomba CBD; 233 km (145 mi) WSW of Brisbane

Government
  - State electorate: Southern Downs
  - Federal division: Maranoa

Area
  - Total: 37.0 km^{2} (14.3 sq mi)

Population
  - Total: 22 (2021 census)
  - Density: 0.595/km^{2} (1.54/sq mi)
- Time zone: UTC+10:00 (AEST)
- Postcode: 4357
Suburbs around Millwood
Captains Mountain	Clontarf	Clontarf
Bringalily	Millwood	Clontarf
Bringalily	Kooroongarra	Kooroongarra

Millwood is a rural locality in the Toowoomba Region, Queensland, Australia. In the 2021 census, Millwood had a population of 22 people.

== Geography ==
The Millmerran–Inglewood Road (State Route 82) enters the locality from the north-east (Clontarf) and exits to the south (Bringalily).

== History ==
The name Millwood was coined by local farmer, Tom Twidale, by combining Mill from Millmerran and wood from Inglewood as the locality lay between those two towns.

Millwood Provisional School opened on 23 October 1944 under head teacher Murray Phillip Honor. In January 1960, it became Millwood State School. It closed on 25 June 1965 with the remaining students being transported each day to Millmerran State School. In 1966, the school building was relocated by the Millmerran Boy Scouts.

== Demographics ==
In the 2016 census, Millwood had a population of 23 people.

In the 2021 census, Millwood had a population of 22 people.

== Education ==
There are no schools in Millwood. The nearest government school is Millmerran State School (Prep to Year 10) to Millmerran to the north. There is also a Catholic primary school in Millmerran. There are no nearby schools providing education to Year 12; the alternatives are distance education and boarding school.
