= Bringalily, Queensland =

Bringalily
- Suburb
- Interactive map of Bringalily
- Coordinates: 28.0833°S 151.15°E
- Country: Australia
- State: Queensland
- LGA: Toowoomba Region
- Location: 25.5 km (15.8 mi) SSW of Millmerran; 108 km (67 mi) SW of Toowoomba; 240 km (150 mi) WSW of Brisbane

Government
  - State electorate: Southern Downs
  - Federal division: Maranoa

Area
  - Total: 183.9 km^{2} (71.0 sq mi)

Population
  - Total: 64 (2021 census)
  - Density: 0.3480/km^{2} (0.901/sq mi)
- Time zone: UTC+10:00 (AEST)
- Postcode: 4357
Suburbs around Bringalily
Millmerran Woods	Captains Mountain	Millwood
Woondul	Bringalily	Kooroongarra
Bybera	Canning Creek	Canning Creek

Bringalily is a rural locality in the Toowoomba Region, Queensland, Australia. In the 2021 census, Bringalily had a population of 64 people.

== Geography ==
The Millmerran–Inglewood Road (State Route 82) passes through the eastern part of the locality from north to south.

Wondul State Forest is in the north-west of the locality. Despite the name, Bringalily State Forest is not in the locality, but in the locality of Canning Creek, immediately to the south.

== History ==
Bringalily State School opened on 13 February 1934 and closed on 23 July 1965. It was on the southern side of Millwood Road (approx 28.01446°S 151.13376°E).

Bringalily South Provisional School opened on 1 April 1940. In 1951, it became Bringalily South State School. It closed on 3 March 1967. It was on a 5-acre (2.0 ha) site at 309 Bringalily Creek Road (28.10131°S 151.16309°E).

== Demographics ==
In the 2016 census, Bringalily had a population of 83 people.

In the 2021 census, Bringalily had a population of 64 people.

== Education ==
There are no schools in Bringalily. The nearest government primary and secondary school is Millmerran State School (to Year 10) in Millmerran to the north-east. There are no schools providing schooling to Year 12 nearby; the alternatives are distance education and boarding school.
