= Tummaville, Queensland =

Tummaville
- Suburb
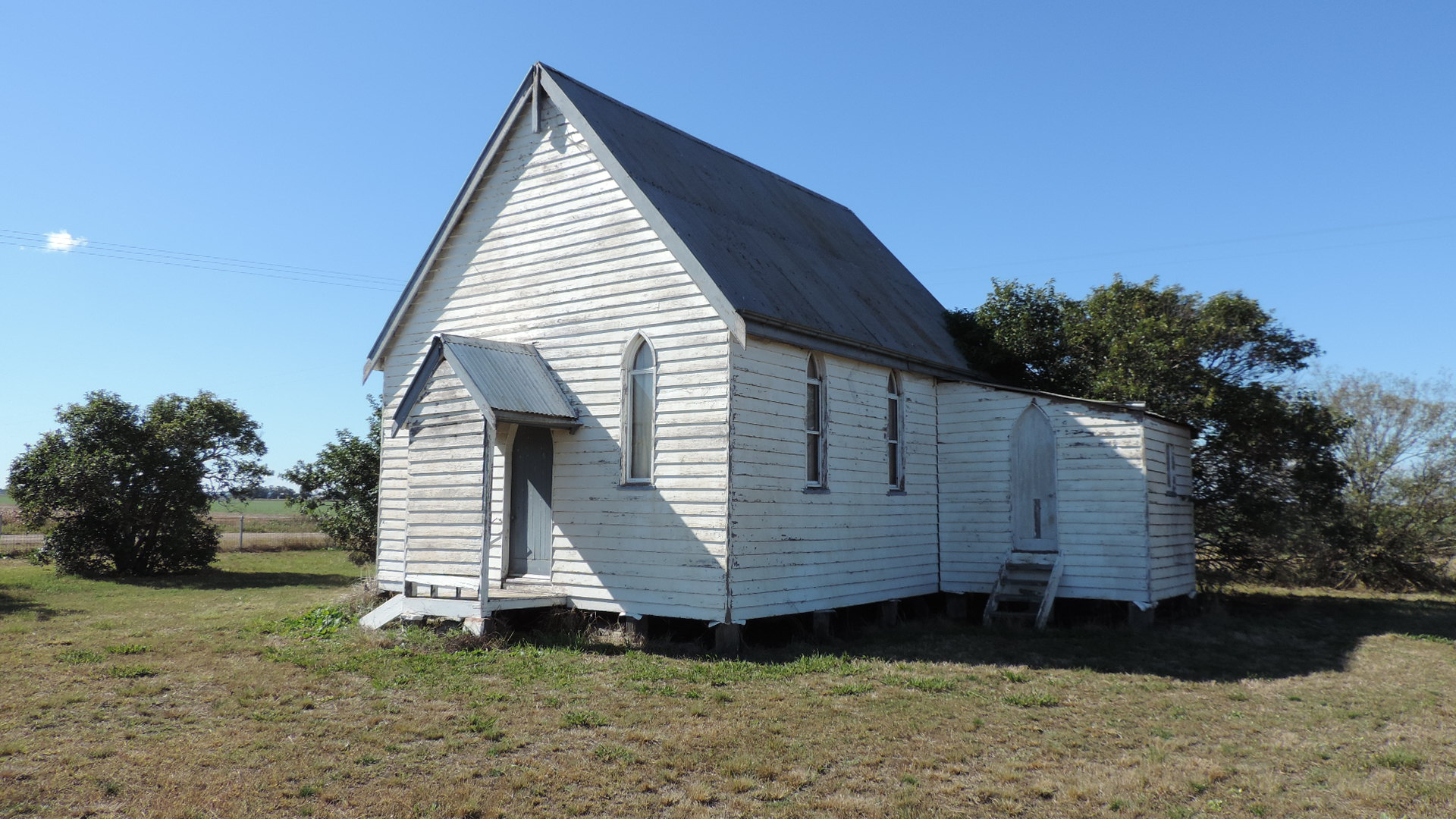
- Former St Paul’s Anglican Church, corner of Church Road and Grasstree Road, Tummaville, 2015

- Interactive map of Tummaville
- Coordinates: 27.9166°S 151.5°E
- Country: Australia
- State: Queensland
- LGA: Toowoomba Region
- Location: 29.8 km (18.5 mi) SW of Pittsworth; 50.5 km (31.4 mi) W of Clifton; 68.3 km (42.4 mi) SW of Toowoomba CBD; 79.7 km (49.5 mi) NW of Warwick; 200 km (120 mi) WSW of Brisbane

Government
  - State electorate: Southern Downs
  - Federal division: Maranoa

Area
  - Total: 279.7 km^{2} (108.0 sq mi)

Population
  - Total: 55 (2021 census)
  - Density: 0.1966/km^{2} (0.509/sq mi)
- Time zone: UTC+10:00 (AEST)
- Postcode: 4352
Suburbs around Tummaville
Pampas	Brookstead; Kincora	North Branch
Yandilla	Tummaville	Ellangowan
Punchs Creek	Stonehenge	Leyburn

Tummaville is a rural locality in the Toowoomba Region, Queensland, Australia. In the 2021 census, Tummaville had a population of 55 people.

== History ==
The locality's name is derived from the parish name, allegedly an Aboriginal corruption of the name Domville referring to pastoralist Domville Taylor who was in the area in the 1840s.

Tummaville State School opened on 19 January 1880. It closed in 1962. It was on a 2-acre (0.81 ha) site on the southern side of Missen Road (27.86930°S 151.42009°E).

St Paul's Anglican Church is on the corner of Church Road and Grasstree Road (27.8732°S 151.4278°E). It was dedicated on 25 February 1891 by Bishop William Thomas Thornhill Webber and was closed circa 1985. The cemetery to the side of the church is now operated by the Toowoomba Regional Council.

== Demographics ==
In the 2016 census, Tummaville had a population of 63 people.

In the 2021 census, Tummaville had a population of 55 people.

== Education ==
There are no schools in Tummaville. The nearest government primary schools are:

- Brookstead State School in neighbouring Brookstead to the north
- Pittsworth State School in Pittsworth to the north-east
- Leyburn State School in neighbouring Leyburn to the south-east
- Millmerran State School in Millmerran to the west

The nearest government secondary schools are:

- Pittsworth State High School (to Year 12) in Pittsworth to the north-east
- Millmerran State School (to Year 10) in Millmerran to the west
- Clifton State High School (to Year 12) in Clifton to the east

However, students in the south-west of the locality may be too distant to attend these secondary schools. The alternatives are distance education and boarding school.
