= Rocky Creek, Queensland =

Rocky Creek
- Suburb
- Interactive map of Rocky Creek
- Coordinates: 28.0166°S 151.35°E
- Country: Australia
- State: Queensland
- LGA: Toowoomba Region
- Location: 24.5 km (15.2 mi) SE of Millmerran; 61.9 km (38.5 mi) SW of Pittsworth; 102 km (63 mi) SW of Toowoomba; 237 km (147 mi) WSW of Brisbane

Government
  - State electorate: Southern Downs
  - Federal division: Maranoa

Area
  - Total: 46.3 km^{2} (17.9 sq mi)

Population
  - Total: 35 (2021 census)
  - Density: 0.756/km^{2} (1.958/sq mi)
- Time zone: UTC+10:00 (AEST)
- Postcode: 4357
Suburbs around Rocky Creek
Grays Gate	Grays Gate	Punchs Creek
Lavelle	Rocky Creek	Punchs Creek
Mount Emlyn	Kooroongarra	Stonehenge

Rocky Creek is a rural locality in the Toowoomba Region, Queensland, Australia. In the 2021 census, Rocky Creek had a population of 35 people.

== History ==
Rocky Creek Provisional School opened on 9 February 1903. On 1 January 1909, it became Rocky Creek State School. It closed on 28 April 1972. It was on the western side of Rocky Creek Road (approx 28.00697°S 151.35026°E).

== Demographics ==
In the 2016 census, Rocky Creek had a population of 41 people.

In the 2021 census, Rocky Creek had a population of 35 people.

== Education ==
There are no schools in Rocky Creek. The nearest government primary school is Millmerran State School in Millmerran to the north-west. The nearest government secondary schools are Millmerran State School (to Year 10) and Pittsworth State High School (to Year 12) in Pittsworth to the north-east. There are also Catholic primary schools in Millmerran and Pittsworth.
