= Stonehenge, Queensland (Toowoomba Region) =

Stonehenge
- Suburb
- Interactive map of Stonehenge
- Coordinates: 28.1166°S 151.3833°E
- Country: Australia
- State: Queensland
- LGA: Toowoomba Region
- Location: 41.6 km (25.8 mi) SE of Millmerran; 72.8 km (45.2 mi) WNW of Warwick; 84.5 km (52.5 mi) SW of Toowoomba; 215 km (134 mi) WSW of Brisbane
- Established: early 1840s

Government
  - State electorate: Southern Downs
  - Federal division: Maranoa

Area
  - Total: 244.9 km^{2} (94.6 sq mi)

Population
  - Total: 20 (2021 census)
  - Density: 0.082/km^{2} (0.21/sq mi)
- Time zone: UTC+10:00 (AEST)
- Postcode: 4357
Suburbs around Stonehenge
Rocky Creek	Punchs Creek	Tummaville
Kooroongarra	Stonehenge	Leyburn
Canning Creek	Mosquito Creek	Karara

Stonehenge is a rural locality in the Toowoomba Region, Queensland, Australia. In the 2021 census, Stonehenge had a population of 20 people.

== Geography ==
Stonehenge Road enters the locality from the north-east (Leyburn) and exits to the south-west (Kooroongarra).

Bringalily State Forest is in the south-west corner of the locality, extending into the neighbouring locality of Canning Creek. Apart from this protected area, the land use is predominantly grazing on native vegetation with a small amount of crop growing.

== History ==
The locality was named after a relatively small pastoral run established by Herbert Evans in the 1840s. The name relates to rock formations near the homestead.

Stonehenge was opened for selection on 17 April 1877; 43 square miles (110 km^{2}) were available.

== Demographics ==
In the 2016 census, Stonehenge had a population of 27 people.

In the 2021 census, Stonehenge had a population of 20 people.

== Education ==
There are no schools in Stonehenge. The nearest government primary schools are Leyburn State School in neighbouring Leyburn to the north-east, Karara State School in neighbouring Karara to the south-east, and Millmerran State School in Millmerran to the north-west. The nearest government secondary schools are Millmerran State School (to Year 10) and Clifton State High School in Clifton to the north-east. However, most of Stonehenge is too distant to attend Clifton State High School with the alternatives being distance education and boarding school.

There is also a Catholic primary school in Millmerran.
