= Lavelle, Queensland =

Lavelle
- Suburb
- Interactive map of Lavelle
- Coordinates: 28.0000°S 151.2833°E
- Country: Australia
- State: Queensland
- LGA: Toowoomba Region
- Location: 16.4 km (10.2 mi) S of Millmerran; 60.2 km (37.4 mi) SW of Pittsworth; 98.7 km (61.3 mi) SW of Toowoomba CBD; 231 km (144 mi) WSW of Brisbane

Government
  - State electorate: Southern Downs
  - Federal division: Maranoa

Area
  - Total: 20.3 km^{2} (7.8 sq mi)

Population
  - Total: 27 (2021 census)
  - Density: 1.330/km^{2} (3.44/sq mi)
- Time zone: UTC+10:00 (AEST)
- Postcode: 4357
Suburbs around Lavelle
Clontarf	Grays Gate	Grays Gate
Clontarf	Lavelle	Rocky Creek
Kooroongarra	Mount Emlyn	Mount Emlyn

Lavelle is a rural locality in the Toowoomba Region, Queensland, Australia. In the 2021 census, Lavelle had a population of 27 people.

== Geography ==
Kooroongarra Road enters the locality from the north (Grays Gate) and exits to the south-west (Kooroongarra).

The land use is predominantly crop growing with some grazing on native vegetation.

== History ==
The locality was named after Martin Lavelle, a surveyor, who surveyed the Lavelle and surrounding areas in the 1880s.

Lavelle Provisional School opened on 4 May 1926. On 29 January 1936, it became Lavelle State School. It closed on 31 December 1957. It was on the western side of Kooroongarra Road (27.9880°S 151.2834°E).

== Demographics ==
In the 2016 census, Lavelle had a population of 29 people.

In the 2021 census, Lavelle had a population of 27 people.

== Education ==
There are no schools in Lavelle. The nearest government school is Millmerran State School (Prep to Year 10) in Millmerran to the north. There are no nearby schools offering education to Year 12; the nearest is Pittsworth State High School in Pittsworth to the north-east. The alternatives are distance education and boarding school.
