= Clontarf, Queensland (Toowoomba Region) =

Rural locality in Queensland, Australia

Clontarf
- Suburb
- Interactive map of Clontarf
- Coordinates: 27.9666°S 151.2333°E
- Country: Australia
- State: Queensland
- LGA: Toowoomba Region
- Location: 11.8 km (7.3 mi) S of Millmerran; 55.6 km (34.5 mi) SW of Pittsworth; 94.0 km (58.4 mi) SW of Toowoomba CBD; 226 km (140 mi) WSW of Brisbane

Government
  - State electorate: Southern Downs
  - Federal division: Maranoa

Area
  - Total: 62.0 km^{2} (23.9 sq mi)

Population
  - Total: 28 (2021 census)
  - Density: 0.452/km^{2} (1.170/sq mi)
- Time zone: UTC+10:00 (AEST)
- Postcode: 4357
Suburbs around Clontarf
Captains Mountain	Millmerran	Domville
Captains Mountain	Clontarf	Grays Gate
Millwood	Kooroongarra	Lavelle

Clontarf is a rural locality in the Toowoomba Region, Queensland, Australia. In the 2021 census, Clontarf had a population of 28 people.

== Geography ==
The Domville State Forest is a protected area in the north of the locality; it extends into neighbouring Millmerran. In the north-east of the locality is a small part of the Commodore Mine extending over from neighbouring Domville.

Apart from those uses, the predominant land use is for agriculture, being a mix of crop growing and grazing on native vegetation.

The Millmerran–Inglewood Road (State Route 82) enters the locality from north (Millmerran / Domville) and exits to south-west (Millwood).

== History ==
The locality takes its name from Clontarf in Ireland, the birthplace of local pioneer John McLoughlin.

Clontarf State School opened on 2 December 1913 and closed on 28 April 1972. It was on triangular land parcel on the eastern side of Clontarf Lavelle Road (approx 27.97359°S 151.24628°E).

== Demographics ==
In the 2016 census, Clontarf had a population of 25 people.

In the 2021 census, Clontarf had a population of 28 people.

== Education ==
There are no schools in Clontarf. The nearest government primary school is Millmerran State School in neighbouring Millmerran to the north. The nearest government secondary schools are Millmerran State School (to Year 10) and Pittsworth State High School (to Year 12) in Pittsworth to the north-east. However, some parts of Clontarf are too distant for a daily commute to Pittsworth, so the alternatives are distance education and boarding school.
