= Stonehenge, Queensland =

Stonehenge, Queensland may refer to:

- Stonehenge, Queensland (Barcoo Shire)
- Stonehenge, Queensland (Toowoomba Region)
