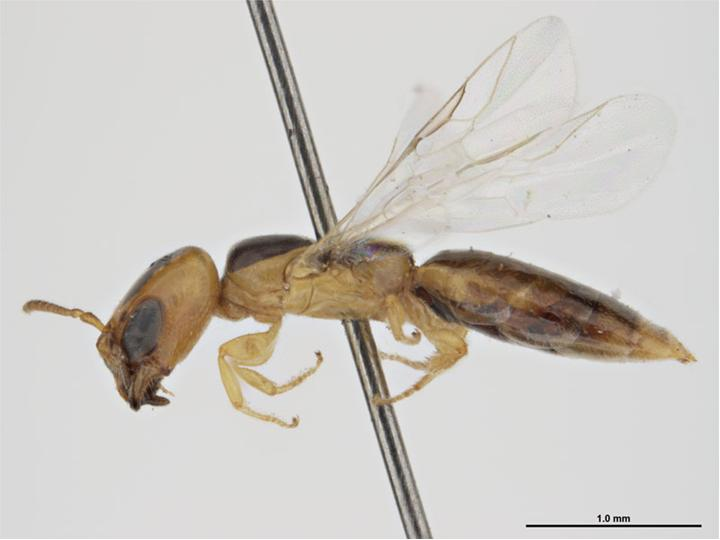
- Female

Scientific classification
- Kingdom: Animalia
- Phylum: Arthropoda
- Clade: Pancrustacea
- Class: Insecta
- Order: Hymenoptera
- Family: Colletidae
- Genus: Euryglossina
- Species: E. leyburnensis

Binomial name
- Euryglossina leyburnensis (Exley, 1983)

Synonyms
- Euryglossina (Turnerella) leyburnensis Exley, 1983

= Euryglossina leyburnensis =

Species of bee

Euryglossina leyburnensis, or Euryglossina (Euryglossina) leyburnensis, also known as the cylindrical perplexing bee, is a species of bee in the family Colletidae and the subfamily Euryglossinae. It is endemic to Australia. It was described in 1983 by Australian entomologist Elizabeth Exley.

== Description ==
Female body length is 5.0 mm, wing length 2.6 mm. The body is long, slender and cylindrical, with tridentate mandibles. The colour is mainly yellow and dark brown, with a yellow-orange head.

== Distribution and habitat ==
The species occurs in eastern Australia. The type locality is 15 km south of Leyburn, Queensland. Other published localities include Nanango and Stanthorpe in Queensland, as well as Legume in New South Wales.

== Behaviour ==
The adults are flying mellivores. Flowering plants visited by the bees include Angophora and Eucalyptus species. The body shape and tridentate mandibles indicate that the bees nest in wood.

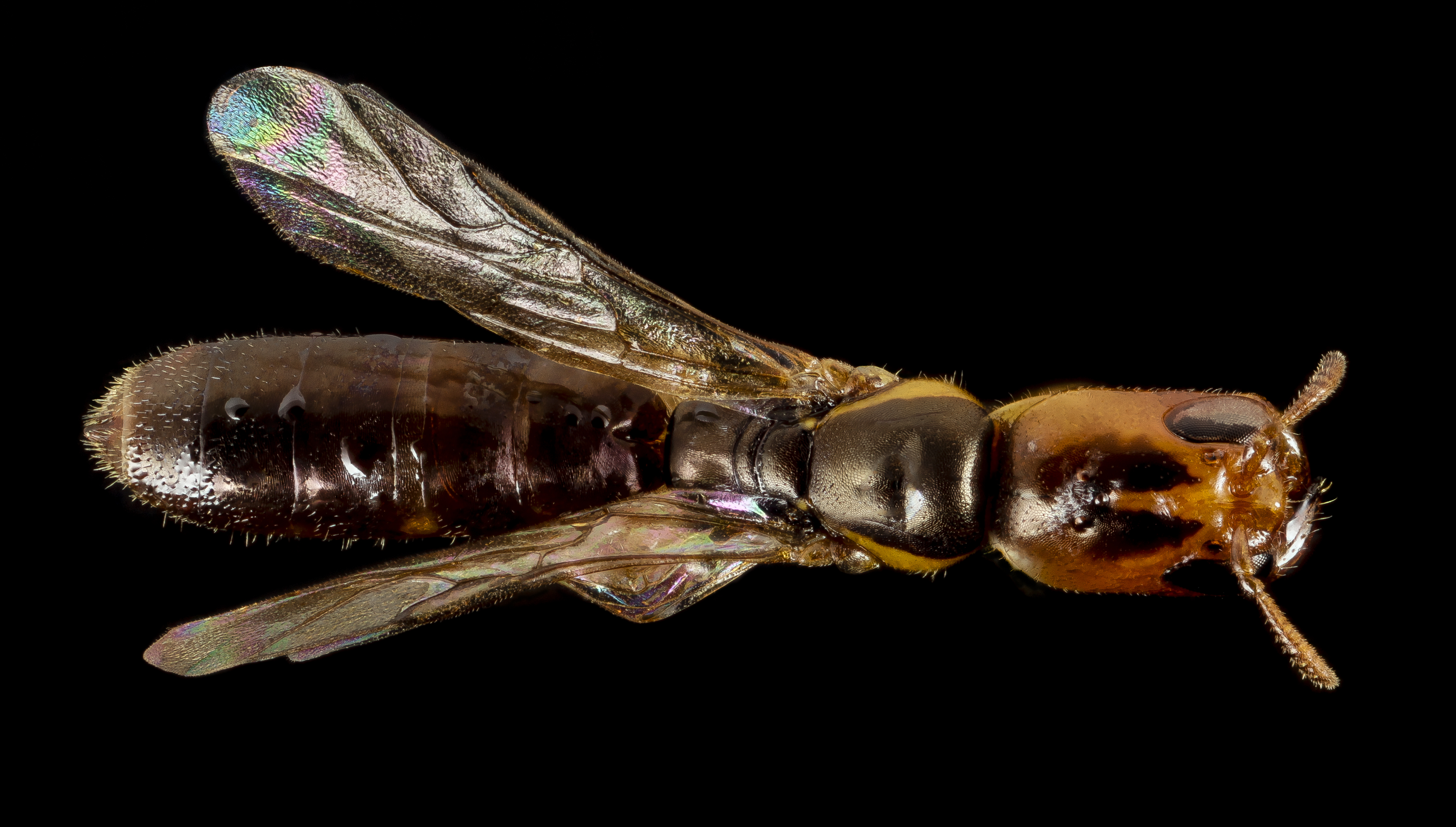
Dorsal view

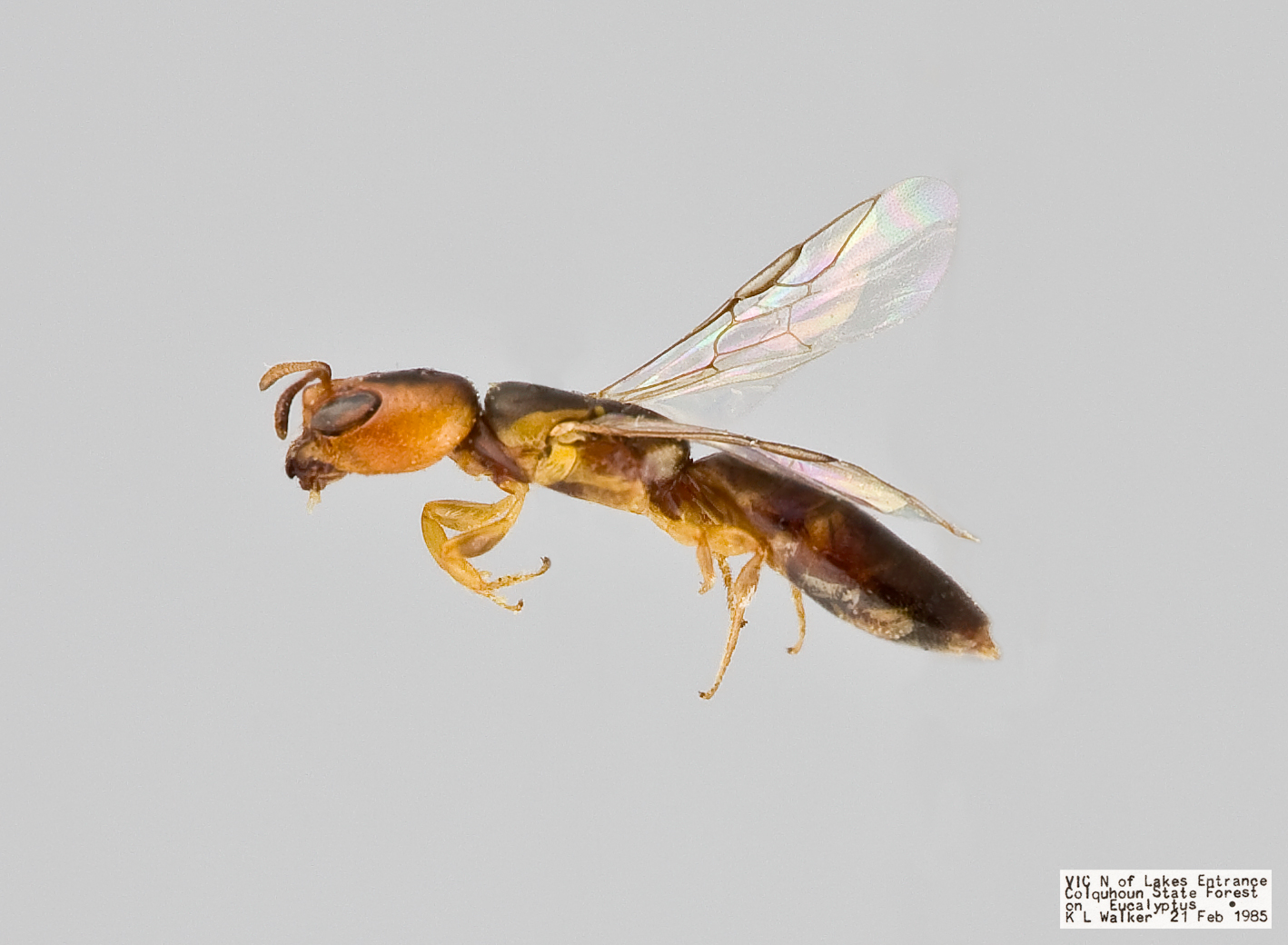
Male
