= Women's archery in Australia =

In Australia, archery is a sport in which men and women compete against each other on an equal playing field. Coed competitions have occurred since Australia's colonial era. An example of one such competition took played in Yandilla, Queensland, in 1878. Women's archery was established in Victoria by the 1870s, mostly in archery clubs. People viewed women's archery as a royal sport during this era and they encouraged women to participate because it did not require women to give up their womanhood in order to compete. Women were members of an archery club in Adelaide by 1870.

Archery became part of the women's physical education curriculum during the 1880s. The largest area to adopt this sport in the curriculum was in Victoria at schools like MLC Kew, which borrowed heavily from a British sporting tradition.

In 1932, the Australian branch National Council of the YWCA sent questionnaires to individual branches asking the branches what sports they preferred to participate in. Archery was one of the sports women indicated interest in. The Adelaide branch cited archery and said participation in this and other sports taught girls loyalty, "fair play, co-operation, friendliness, unselfishness, self-control and doggedness."

At the 1982 Commonwealth Games held in Brisbane, new women's sports were included on the programming including archery and lawn bowls.

Cassie McCall (Woods) won the bronze medal for women's individual compound at the 2010 Commonwealth Games in Dehli.

Elisa Barnard competed at the London 2012 Olympic Games, one of two archers to representing Australia.

Australian women have been awarded scholarships for archery at the Australian Institute of Sport. They include Jade Beatty who held a scholarship from 2001 to 2002, Deonne Bridger who held a scholarship from 1997 to 2000 and Mary Chidlow who held a scholarship in 1998. Australian women on scholarship are based in Canberra.

== Bibliography ==
- Howard, Bruce (1978). The Proud Australians. Adelaide, South Australia: Rigby. ISBN 0-7270-1741-1.
- Nihil, G. (2006). Australian Institute of Sport: Celebrating Excellence. Focus Publishing. ISBN 1-921156-16-3.
- Stell, Marion K. (1991). Half the Race: A History of Australian Women in Sport. North Ryde, Australia: Harper Collins. ISBN 0-207-16971-3.
