= Mount Emlyn, Queensland =

Mount Emlyn
- Suburb
- Interactive map of Mount Emlyn
- Coordinates: 28.0333°S 151.3°E
- Country: Australia
- State: Queensland
- LGA: Toowoomba Region
- Location: 21.2 km (13.2 mi) S of Millmerran; 63.1 km (39.2 mi) SW of Pittsworth; 102 km (63 mi) SW of Toowoomba CBD; 230 km (140 mi) WSW of Brisbane

Government
  - State electorate: Southern Downs
  - Federal division: Maranoa

Area
  - Total: 24.1 km^{2} (9.3 sq mi)

Population
  - Total: 0 (2021 census)
  - Density: 0.000/km^{2} (0.00/sq mi)
- Time zone: UTC+10:00 (AEST)
- Postcode: 4357
Suburbs around Mount Emlyn
Lavelle	Lavelle	Rocky Creek
Kooroongarra	Mount Emlyn	Rocky Creek
Kooroongarra	Kooroongarra	Kooroongarra

Mount Emlyn is a rural locality in the Toowoomba Region of Queensland, Australia. In the 2021 census, Mount Emlyn had "no people or a very low population".

== Geography ==
Mount Emlyn is in the north-east of the locality (28.0282°S 151.3131°E) at 590 metres (1,940 ft) above sea level.

== History ==
The locality is named after the mountain, which was originally known as Mount Allys, which was the family name of Lord Cawdor of the British House of Peers. It was renamed Mount Emlyn in the late 1800s, after the second wife of Francis Arthur Gore, grazier of Yandilla Station.

Mount Emlyn Provisional School opened on 10 May 1920. In 1948, it became Mount Emylyn State School. It closed on 21 April 1957.

== Demographics ==
In the 2016 census, Mount Emlyn had a population of 16 people.

In the 2021 census, Mount Emlyn had "no people or a very low population".

== Education ==
There are no schools in Mount Emlyn. The nearest government primary and secondary school is Millmerran State School (to Year 10) in Millmerran to the north. There are no nearby secondary schools providing education to Year 12; the alternatives are distance education and boarding school.
