= Grays Gate, Queensland =

Grays Gate
- Suburb
- Interactive map of Grays Gate
- Coordinates: 27.9694°S 151.3194°E
- Country: Australia
- State: Queensland
- LGA: Toowoomba Region
- Location: 14.3 km (8.9 mi) S of Millmerran; 56.2 km (34.9 mi) SW of Pittsworth; 94.6 km (58.8 mi) SW of Toowoomba; 227 km (141 mi) WSW of Brisbane

Government
  - State electorate: Southern Downs
  - Federal division: Maranoa

Area
  - Total: 29.8 km^{2} (11.5 sq mi)
- Elevation: 420–480 m (1,380–1,570 ft)

Population
  - Total: 28 (2021 census)
  - Density: 0.940/km^{2} (2.43/sq mi)
- Time zone: UTC+10:00 (AEST)
- Postcode: 4357
Suburbs around Grays Gate
Domville	Millmerran	Punchs Creek
Clontarf	Grays Gate	Rocky Creek
Lavelle	Lavelle	Rocky Creek

Grays Gate is a rural locality in the Toowoomba Region, Queensland, Australia. In the 2021 census, Grays Gate had a population of 28 people.

== Geography ==
The locality is to the south of Millmerran.

The land use is predominantly crop growing with some grazing on native vegetation.

== History ==
The locality is believed to be named after an early settler.

Public telephone facilities became available in August 1924.

== Demographics ==
In the 2016 census, Grays Gate had a population of 38 people.

In the 2021 census, Grays Gate had a population of 28 people.

== Education ==
There are no schools in Grays Gate. Millmerran State School in neighbouring Millmerran to the north provides primary schooling and secondary schooling to Year 10. For secondary schooling to Year 12, the nearest government school is Pittsworth State High School in Pittsworth to the north-east.
