= Canning Creek, Queensland =

Canning Creek
- Suburb
- Interactive map of Canning Creek
- Coordinates: 28.26806°S 151.14472°E
- Country: Australia
- State: Queensland
- LGAs: Goondiwindi Region; Toowoomba Region
- Location: 36.7 km (22.8 mi) NNE of Inglewood; 108 km (67 mi) W of Warwick; 119 km (74 mi) SW of Toowoomba; 128 km (80 mi) NE of Goondiwindi; 251 km (156 mi) WSW of Brisbane
- Established: 1877

Government
  - State electorate: Southern Downs
  - Federal division: Maranoa

Area
  - Total: 288.1 km^{2} (111.2 sq mi)

Population
  - Total: 21 (2021 census)
  - Density: 0.0729/km^{2} (0.189/sq mi)
- Postcode: 4357
Suburbs around Canning Creek
Bringalily	Bringalily	Stonehenge
Bybera	Canning Creek	Mosquito Creek
Inglewood	Inglewood	Mosquito Creek

Canning Creek is a rural locality split between the Goondiwindi Region and the Toowoomba Region in Queensland, Australia. In the 2021 census, Canning Creek had a population of 21 people.

== Geography ==
The Millmerran–Inglewood Road (State Route 82) passes through the locality from north to south.

Much of the locality is occupied by a large portion of the Bringalily State Forest.

== History ==
The locality takes its name from the creek named in 1827 by explorer Allan Cunningham after Sir George Canning, the prime minister of Great Britain.

British pastoralists arrived in the 1840s with Captain Robert Gerald Moffatt, a retired British Army officer of the 17th Regiment, forming the Canning Creek pastoral lease.

In 1848, three Aboriginal women and one child were murdered in the area by a posse of seven white men.

Canning Creek was opened for selection on 17 April 1877; 112 square miles (290 km^{2}) were available.

The Canning Creek Provisional School opened on 15 November 1885 and became Canning Creek State School on 1 January 1909. The school closed on a number of occasions due to low student numbers. On 18 April 1922, it became a half-time school sharing the teacher with Glenside State School, with both schools closing on 20 June 1922.

Glenside Provisional School opened in 1914. On 1 December 1914, it became Glenside State School. On 18 April 1922, it was closed as a full-time school and reopened as a half time school in conjunction with Canning Creek State School. Due to the distance between the two schools they both closed on 20 June 1922.

== Demographics ==
In the 2016 census, Canning Creek had a population of 5 people.

In the 2021 census, Canning Creek had a population of 21 people.

== Education ==
There are no schools in the locality. The nearest primary and secondary school is Inglewood State School (Prep to Year 10) in neighbouring Inglewood to the south. There are no nearby secondary schools for education to Year 12; the nearest are Goondiwindi State High School in Goondiwindi and Warwick State High School in Warwick. Other alternatives are distance education and boarding school.
