= Yandilla, Queensland =

Yandilla
- Suburb
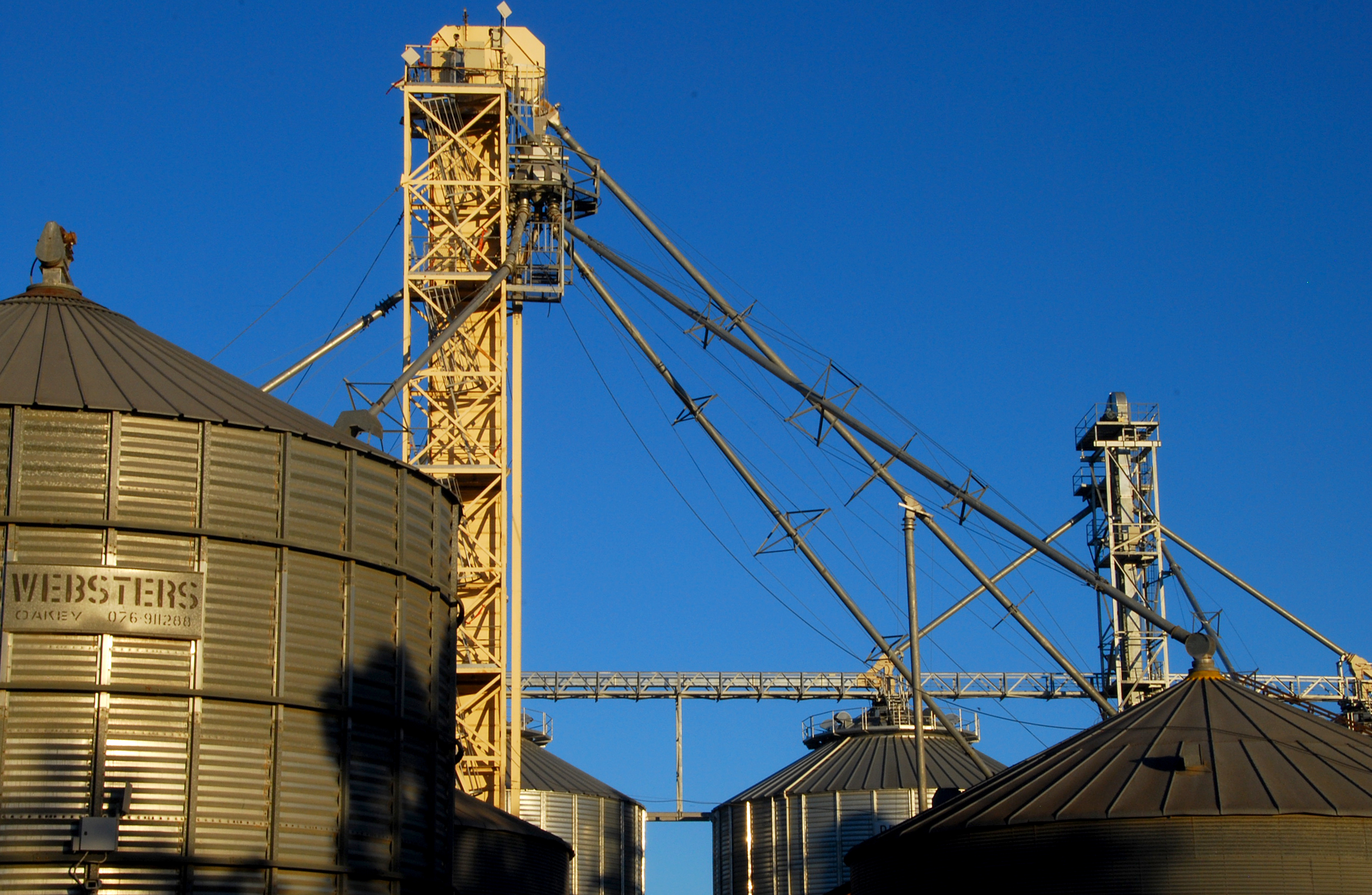
- Silos, Gore Highway, 2015

- Interactive map of Yandilla
- Coordinates: 27.85°S 151.35°E
- Country: Australia
- State: Queensland
- LGA: Toowoomba Region
- Location: 14.6 km (9.1 mi) NE of Millmerran; 36.5 km (22.7 mi) SW of Pittsworth; 75.1 km (46.7 mi) SW of Toowoomba CBD; 211 km (131 mi) WSW of Brisbane

Government
  - State electorate: Southern Downs
  - Federal division: Maranoa

Area
  - Total: 86.1 km^{2} (33.2 sq mi)

Population
  - Total: 50 (2021 census)
  - Density: 0.58/km^{2} (1.50/sq mi)
- Time zone: UTC+10:00 (AEST)
- Postcode: 4352
Suburbs around Yandilla
Lemontree	Pampas	Tummaville
Millmerran	Yandilla	Tummaville
Millmerran	Punchs Creek	Tummaville

Yandilla is a rural locality in the Toowoomba Region, Queensland, Australia. In the 2021 census, Yandilla had a population of 50 people.

== Geography ==
The north-eastern boundary follows the Condamine River.

The Gore Highway passes through from north-east to west.

The area was serviced by the Millmerran railway line with Yandilla railway station (27.8402°S 151.3665°E) serving the locality.

== History ==
The locality takes its name from a pastoral run name. The name was first used in 1842 by St George Richard Gore pastoralist and politician. The run was at first briefly known as Grass Tree Creek and there is still a creek by that name in the area. The origin of the name Yandilla is unclear. One claim is that it is a local Aboriginal word meaning running water. Another claim is that it is named after a village in Ireland as St George Gore was a brother of the 7th Baronet of Manor Gore in Donegal.

All Saints Anglican Church is a timber church which was erected at Yandilla Station by the Gore family about 1878 on the site of an earlier church, which it closely resembled. The graveyard around the church is believed to have been established in 1863 supplanting the previous custom of burial close to the homestead.

Yandilla Provisional School opened on 2 October 1882. In 1901, it was renamed Millmerran Provisional School. On 1 January 1909, it became Millmerran State School.

A second Yandilla Provisional School opened in October 1945 and closed in 1956.

== Demographics ==
In the 2016 census, Yandilla had a population of 46 people.

In the 2021 census, Yandilla had a population of 50 people.

== Heritage listings ==
Yandilla has a number of heritage-listed sites, including:

- All Saints Anglican Church, Gore Highway

== Education ==
There are no schools in Yandilla. The nearest government primary schools are Millmerran State School in neighbouring Millmerran to the south-west and Brookstead State School in Brookstead to the north. The nearest government secondary schools are Millmerran State School (to Year 10) in Millmerran and Pittsworth State High School (to Year 12) in Pittsworth to the north-east.
