= St. George Richard Gore =

Australian politician

St. George Gore
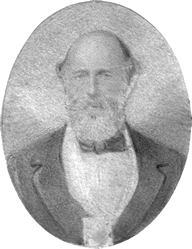

Member of the Queensland Legislative Assembly for Warwick
- In office 2 May 1860 – 17 January 1862
- Preceded by: New seat
- Succeeded by: John Jones

Member of the Queensland Legislative Council
- In office 3 July 1863 – 16 August 1871

Personal details
- Born: St. George Richard Gore; 26 March 1812 Dublin, Ireland
- Died: 16 August 1871 (aged 59) Warwick, Queensland, Australia
- Spouse: Frances Caldwell
- Education: Trinity College, Dublin
- Occupation: Grazier

St. George Richard Gore (26 March 1812 – 16 August 1871) was a grazier and politician in colonial Queensland, a member of the Queensland Legislative Assembly and, later, the Queensland Legislative Council.

== Early life ==
Gore was born in Dublin, Ireland, eldest of five sons of Thomas Gore (brother of the 7th baronet, of Manor Gore, Donegal) and his wife Elizabeth, née Corbet. Gore was of the same family as the Earls of Arran. St George Gore was educated by his father and at Trinity College, Dublin (B.A., 1831; M.A., 1834). He was called to the Bar and practiced in London until 1839, having decided to emigrate. Gore married in 1840 Frances, daughter of the late Edward Coldwell, of Lyndhurst, Southampton, England.

== Queensland grazier ==
Gore, along with brother Ralph Thomas Gore, arrived in Sydney aboard the Bengal in February 1840. Gore moved to Moreton Bay district (now Queensland) and settled in the Warwick, Queensland district at Yandilla.

== Politics ==
Gore was elected to the first Legislative Assembly of Queensland for the Warwick Electorate in May 1860. He was Secretary for Lands and Works in the first Ministry formed under responsible government by Robert Herbert from January to March 1862. Nominated to the Queensland Legislative Council on 3 July 1863, Gore took office in the first Arthur Macalister Government as Postmaster-General, and represented them in the Legislative Council from September 1866 to August 1867. He was again Postmaster-General and leader of the Legislative Council in the Charles Lilley Ministry from January to May 1870.

== Later life ==
Gore died in Warwick, Queensland, Australia on 16 August 1871.

== Legacy ==
The All Saints Anglican Church in Yandilla, built by the Gore family, was listed on the Queensland Heritage Register in 1992.

The town of Gore in the Goondiwindi Region is named after him.

Parliament of Queensland
New seat	Member for Warwick; 1860–1862	Succeeded by John Jones
