= Leyburn, Queensland =

Leyburn
- Town
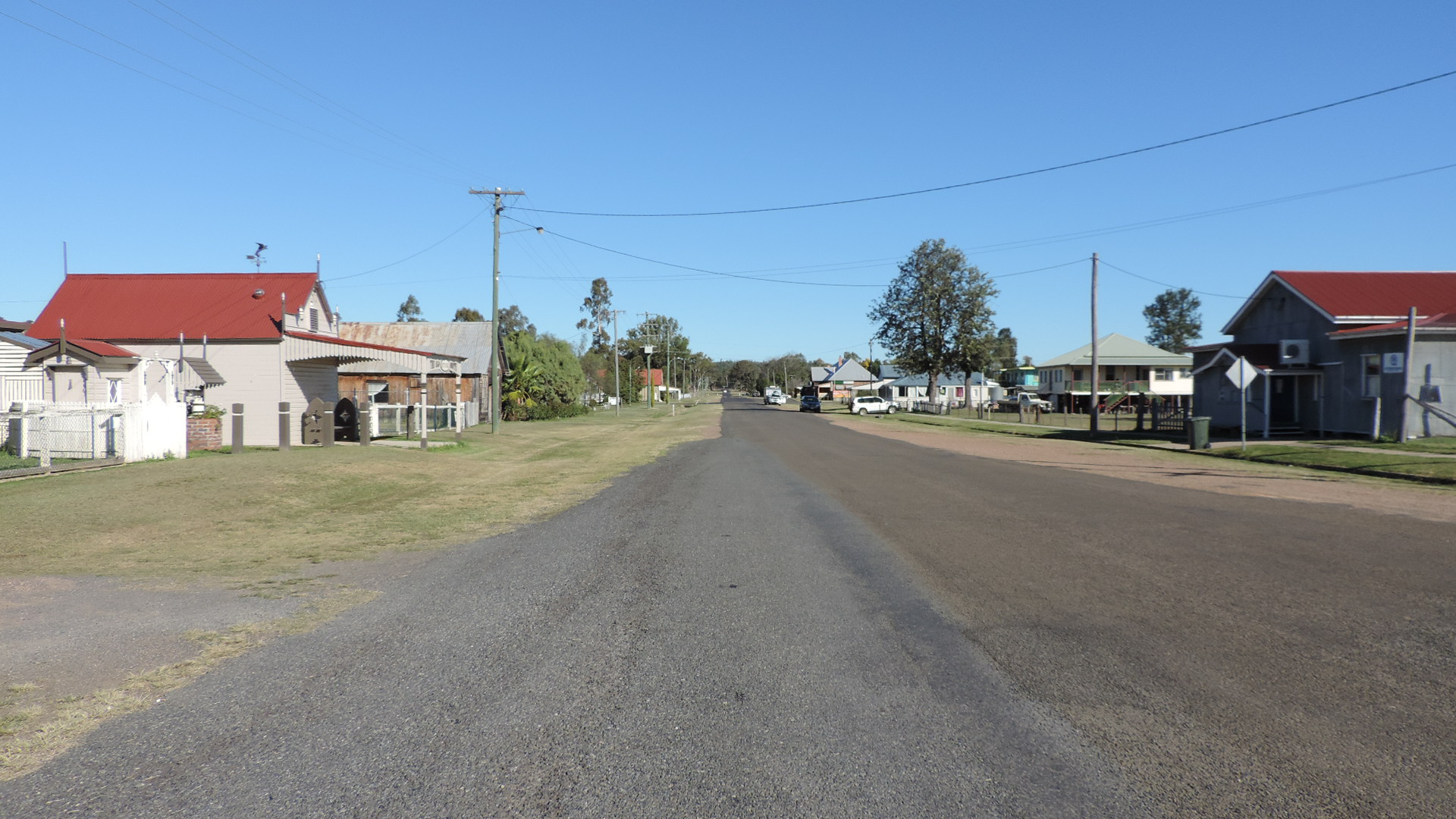
- Macintyre Street (main street), Leyburn, 2015

- Interactive map of Leyburn
- Coordinates: 28.0122°S 151.5838°E
- Country: Australia
- State: Queensland
- LGAs: Southern Downs Region; Toowoomba Region
- Location: 61.4 km (38.2 mi) NW of Warwick; 66.4 km (41.3 mi) SW of Toowoomba; 195 km (121 mi) SW of Brisbane

Government
  - State electorates: Condamine; Southern Downs
  - Federal division: Maranoa

Area
  - Total: 187.9 km^{2} (72.5 sq mi)

Population
  - Total: 566 (2021 census)
  - Density: 3.012/km^{2} (7.802/sq mi)
- Time zone: UTC+10:00 (AEST)
- Postcode: 4365
Localities around Leyburn
Tummaville	Ellangowan	Ellangowan
Stonehenge	Leyburn	Old Talgai; Pratten
Stonehenge	Karara	Thanes Creek

Leyburn (pronounced Lee-burn) is a rural town in the Southern Downs Region and a locality split between the South Downs Region and the Toowoomba Region in Queensland, Australia. In the 2021 census, the locality of Leyburn had a population of 566.

== Geography ==
The town is in the centre of the locality. The Toowoomba–Karara Road (State Route 48) passes through the locality from north-east to south, running immediately to the east of the town. Tourist Drive 12 (the Sprint Route) follows Leyburn Cunningham Road to the outskirts of Warwick.

Leyburn State Forest is a protected area in the east of the locality (28.0316°S 151.6344°E).

Apart from the town and the state forest, the land use is grazing on native vegetation.

== History ==
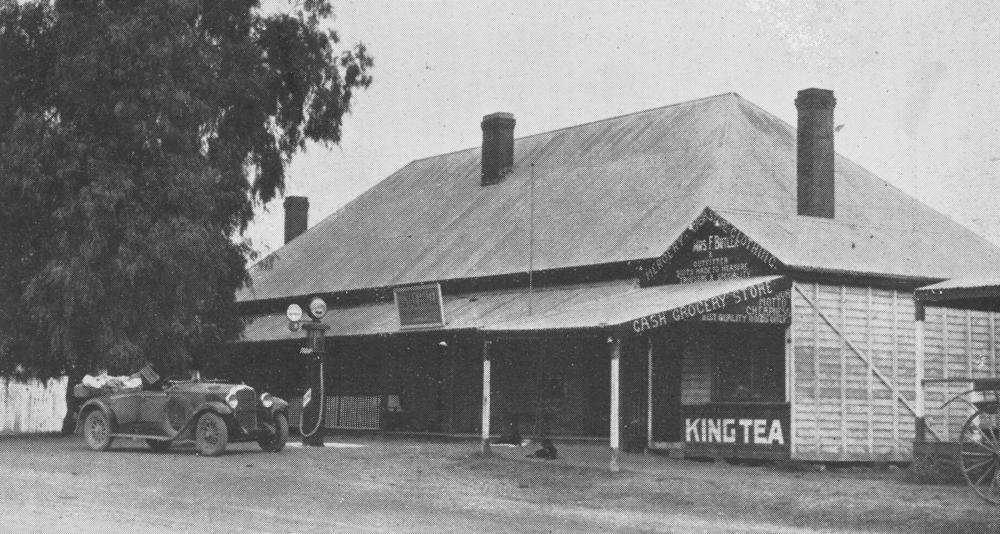
Royal Hotel, Leyburn, circa 1933

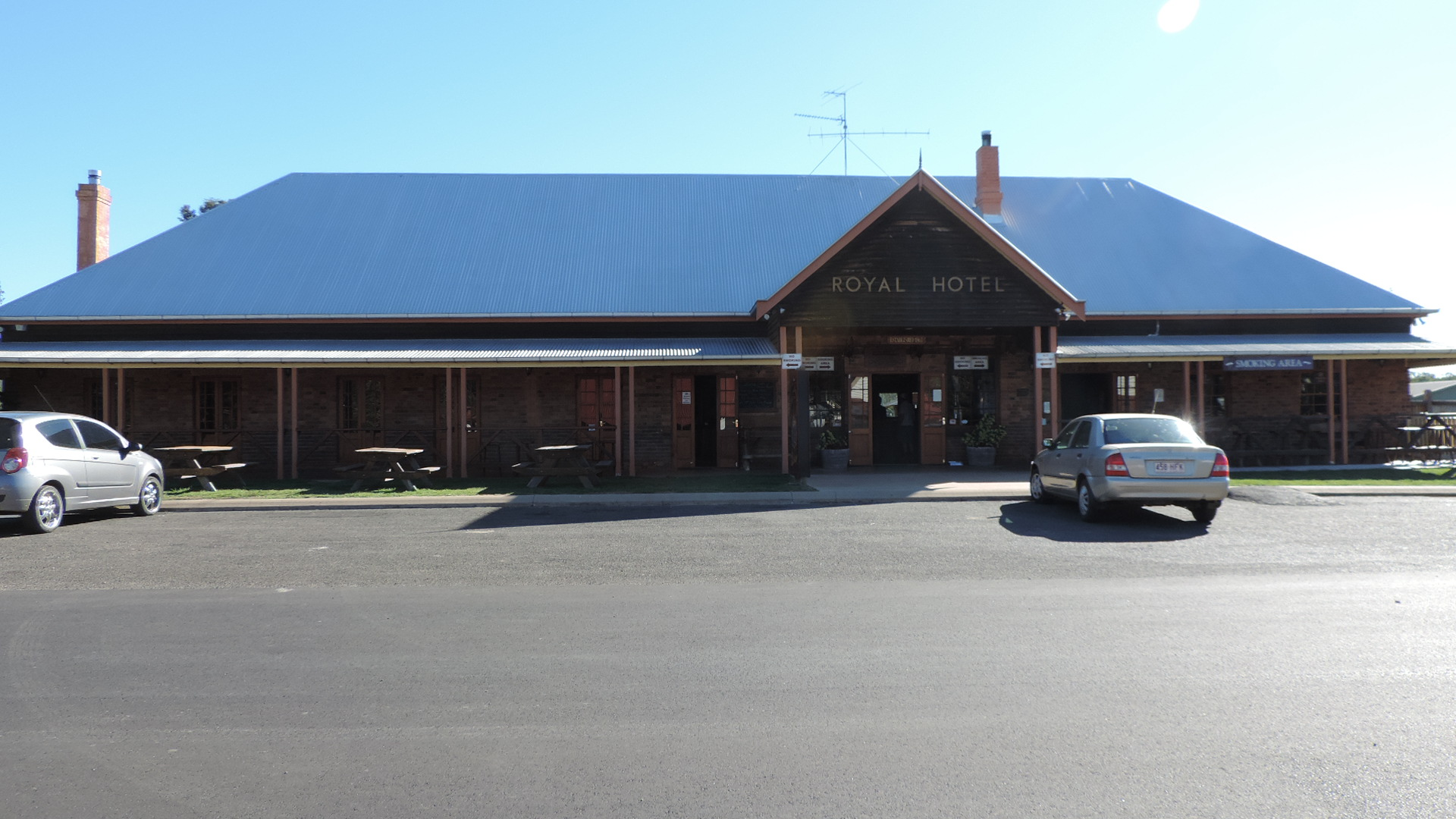
Royal Hotel, Leyburn, 2015

Leyburn was named in the 1840s by William Gray, Snr., who came to the area by bullock dray from Pitt Town on the Hawkesbury River in New South Wales. The first name for the locality was Canal Creek; the name was changed to Leyburn by Henry and Jane Kirby, Gray's son-in-law and daughter, and derives from the market town of Leyburn in the English county of Yorkshire.

The site for the town was surveyed in November 1852. Henry Kirby and another man named Collins applied in 1854 for the licence of the Travellers' Home Inn at Leyburn.

In 1858, James Murray erected his Coffee Room Inn and Boarding House (now the Granall Residence).

The post office at Leyburn opened on 1 January 1861.

A police force was established in 1861. At that time the town had a permanent population 65 but many transients.

Leyburn State School opened on 13 January 1862.

In 1863, James Murray built The Royal Hotel at 71 MacIntyre Street (28.0113°S 151.5831°E), opposite his Coffee Inn. It was later owned by rugby league player Wayne Webcke.

A court house was built in 1866. It was used until 1929.

In September 1871, Bishop Edward Tufnell officially opened and dedicated an Anglican church to St Augustine of Canterbury. On 14 November 2021, St Augustine's Anglican Church celebrated its 150th anniversary.

The Rosenthal Division was established in 1889 and became the Shire of Rosenthal in 1903. Although Leyburn was the largest town within this local government area, it was not chosen as the administrative centre as Leyburn did not have a railway connection in 1889. Instead, offices were established in Warwick outside of the district.

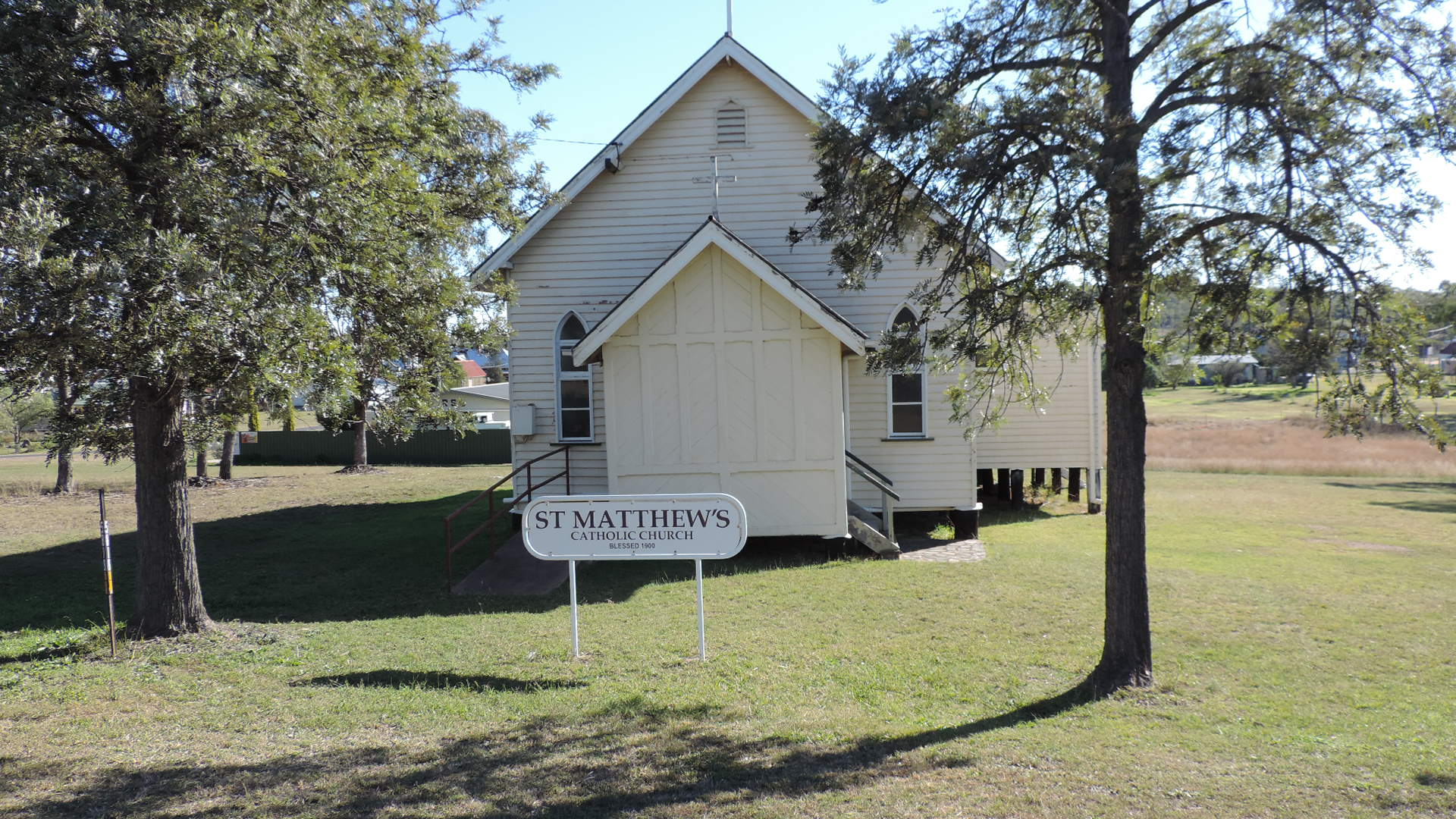
St Matthew's Catholic Church, 2015

On Sunday 8 December 1901 Fathers Horan and O'Brien officially opened St Matthew's Catholic Church. Fund raising for the church had commenced in 1871. It has been suggested that the church was completed (but not officially opened) in 1897 with a wedding held there in September 1898.

The Leyburn branch of the Queensland Country Women's Association was formed in 1924. They built their hall in 1928.

During World War II, an airfield with a 7,000-foot runway was constructed by April 1943 for the use of the United States Army Air Force. The airfield was used by 21 Squadron, 23 Squadron and 99 Squadron and was eventually abandoned by the RAAF in December 1945. The abandoned airfield became the site of the 1949 Australian Grand Prix, the first time the Australian Grand Prix was held in Queensland.

== Demographics ==
In the 2006 census, the locality of Leyburn and the surrounding area had a population of 348 people.

In the 2011 census, the locality of Leyburn had a population of 416 people.

In the 2016 census, the locality of Leyburn had a population of 476 people.

In the 2021 census, the locality of Leyburn had a population of 566 people.

== Heritage listings ==
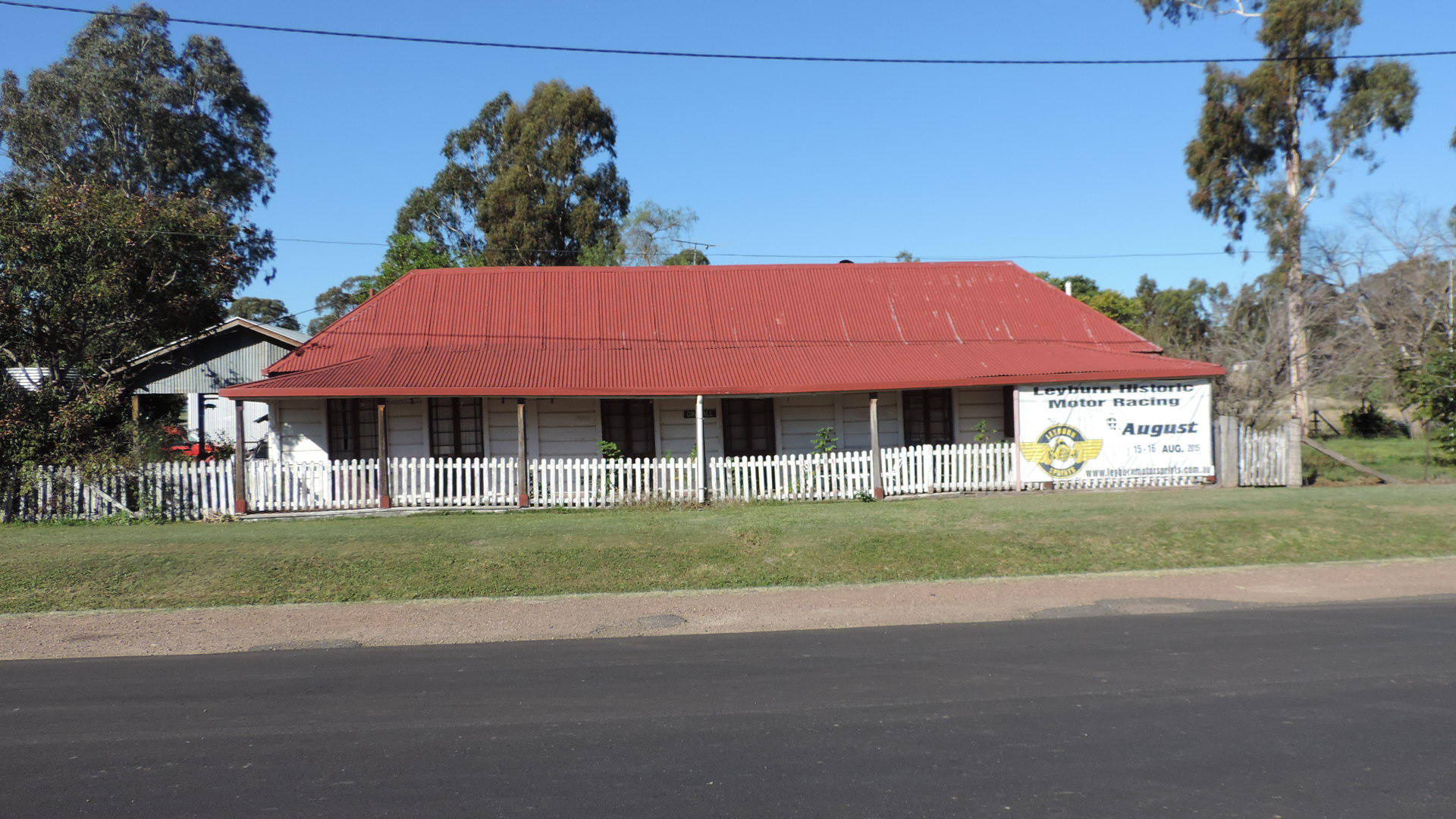
Granall, former coffee house and court house, erected 1858, the oldest surviving building in Leyburn, 2015

Leyburn has a number of heritage-listed sites, including:

- St Augustines Anglican Church, Dove Street
- Leyburn State School, Peter Street
- Granall Residence (1850s), 70 Macintyre Street (28.0114°S 151.5835°E)

== Education ==
Leyburn State School is a government primary (Prep to Year 6) school for boys and girls at 34 Peter Street (28.0132°S 151.5783°E). In 2018, the school had an enrolment of 39 students with 3 teachers (2 full-time equivalent) and 9 non-teaching staff (4 full-time equivalent).

There are no secondary schools in Leyburn. The nearest government secondary schools are Pittsworth State High School (to Year 12) in Pittsworth to the north, Clifton State High School (to Year 12) in Clifton to the north-east, Allora State School (to Year 10) in Allora to the east, Warwick State High School (to Year 12) in Warwick to the south-east, and Millmerran State School (to Year 10) in Millmerran to the north-west.

== Amenities ==
The Southern Downs Regional Council operates a mobile library service which visits Leyburn School in Peter Street and Leyburn Hall in MacIntyre Street.

The Leyburn branch of the Queensland Country Women's Association meets at its hall at 89 MacIntyre Street (28.0097°S 151.5834°E).

St Augustine's Anglican Church is at 5795 Toowoomba Karara Road (also known as Dove Street, 28.0088°S 151.5866°E).

St Matthew's Catholic Church is at 5818 Toowoomba Karara Road (also known as Dove Street, 28.0108°S 151.5854°E).

== Events ==
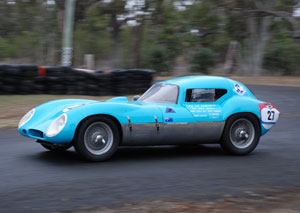
Centaur Waggott GT, Leyburn Sprints, 2007

In 1996 the Leyburn Sprints was established. Celebrating the 1949 Australian Grand Prix, historic racing cars and cars of special interest compete in numerous classes on a short 1.0 kilometre (0.62 mi) course through the town. The event has become the town's biggest attraction.

== Notable residents ==
Australian rugby league player Shane Webcke grew up in Leyburn.
