= Leyburn State School =

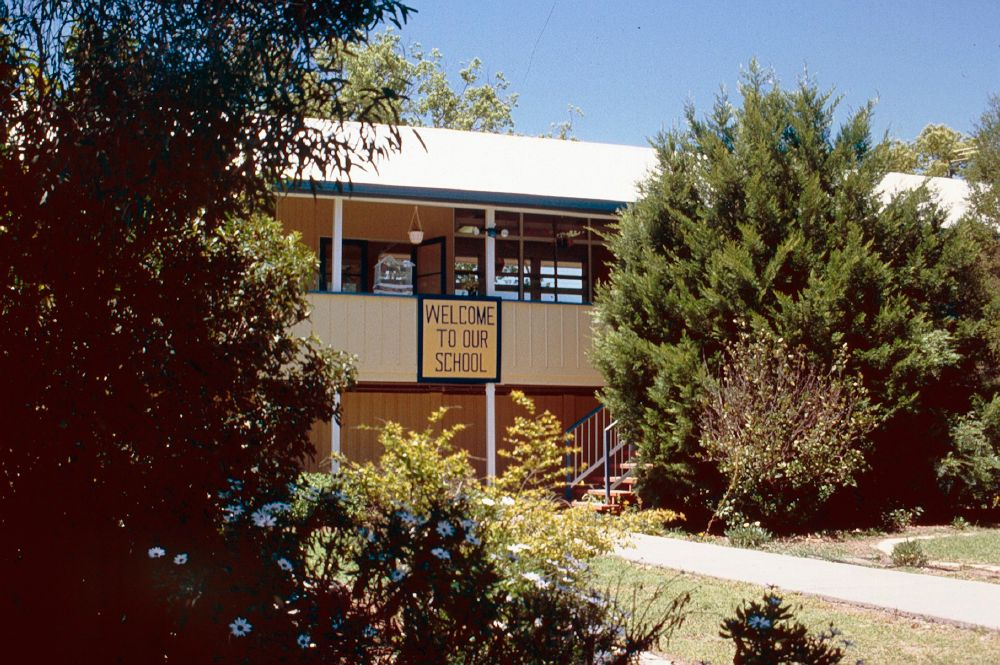
- Leyburn State School, 1995

- Location within Queensland Location within Australia
- 28.0132°S 151.5788°E
- Location: Peter Street, Leyburn, Southern Downs Region, Queensland, Australia

History
- Design period: 1870s–1890s (late 19th century)
- Built: 1883–1930s

Queensland Heritage Register
- Official name: Leyburn State School, Leyburn National School
- Type: state heritage (built)
- Designated: 21 October 1992
- Reference no.: 600827
- Significant period: 1880s–1900s (historical); 1880s–1930s (fabric); 1880s–ongoing (social)
- Significant components: residential accommodation – headmaster's house, school/school room, play shed

Leyburn State School is a heritage-listed state school at Peter Street, Leyburn, Southern Downs Region, Queensland, Australia. It was built from 1883 to 1930s. It is also known as Leyburn National School. It was added to the Queensland Heritage Register on 21 October 1992.

== History ==
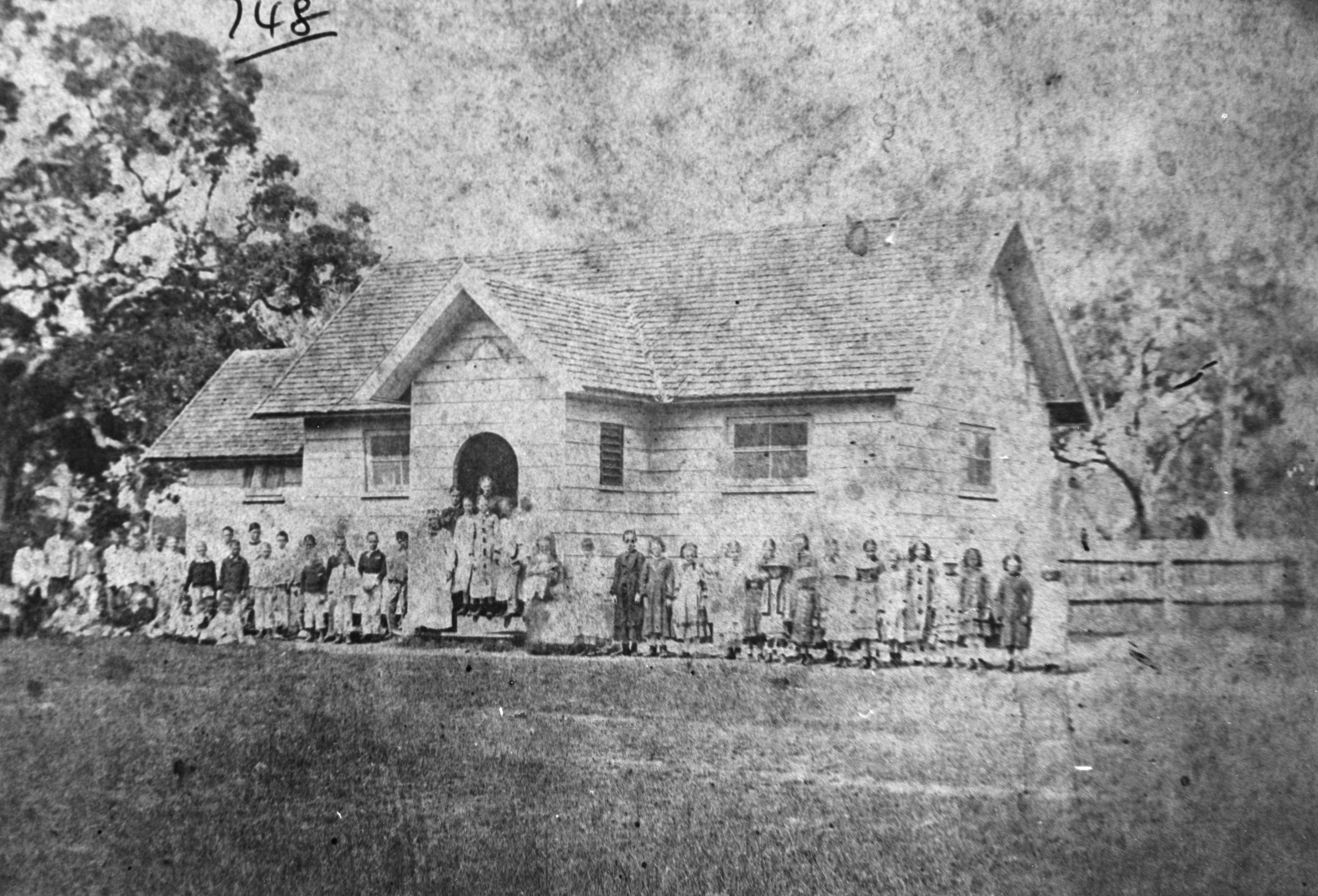
Leyburn State School ca. 1875

The settlement on Canal Creek (a tributary of the Condamine River) had grown from the 1840s to service the colonising settlers following the stock route blazed by the Leslie brothers in 1840 to the southern Darling Downs. Known from 1853 as Leyburn, the first sale of allotments was held in 1857 following the survey of the town earlier that year.

By 1872 a state school, an Anglican church, Police Station and Court House, two smithies, three stores, a sawmill and the inevitable three hotels made up the straggling wooden town centre of Leyboard along the road to Warwick. The town was described as "always a sleepy little town ... whose calm was broken by the brief Canal Creek gold-rush in 1871–1872 ... clothed in dust raised by the slow passage of teams and flocks through the town". Most men were either employed as carriers on the Toowoomba–Goondiwindi road or else worked on nearby stations, rejoining their families at their Leyburn cottages on Saturday night.

As one of the Darling Downs droving, drinking, and administrative centres located on the old stock and work-routes, significant government infrastructure was located in the town; from 1852 Leyburn became a postal distribution point for the district with mail services branching out from the town; in 1872 Leyburn was connected to the electric telegraph system becoming an important repeating station between Sydney and Brisbane; in 1861 Leyburn was appointed as a place for the holding of Courts of Petty Sessions, a Police Magistrate was appointed, and a lock-up erected followed in 1867 by a court house.

Leyburn's first primary school (then called the National School) was established following the petitioning in 1861 by the local community of the colony's Board of General Education. Reputedly the twelfth in Queensland, the school opened with an enrolment of 46 pupils on 13 January 1862 in temporary premises described as a small, dirty and uncomfortable hut pending the building of a more permanent school.

On 22 January 1865 the purpose-built school house was opened. Funded by a combination of local subscriptions and Board moneys, the school was erected on the eastern side of the existing school site bordering a narrow lane. At this time the school site consisted of blocks 8 and 9 (block 7 bordering Canning Street being added in 1945). The new school house was, in the style of the time, a low set building. It contained a single large school room and an adjoining smaller class room with the main entry by way of a covered porch. A verandah appears to have been added to the rear at a later date. Contrary to the Board of Education's recommendations, and owing to cost and time factors, the school was built not of brick but of timber (cypress pine). Soon afterwards, in fact, architect Richard George Suter was to convince the Board of the utility of timber schools and a number were to be erected throughout Queensland.

The bypassing of Leyburn by the railways signalled its decline (a common issue for many bypassed towns). In 1868 the Toowoomba to Dalby link on the Western railway line was completed and in 1871 the Toowoomba to Warwick link on the Southern railway line leaving only (yet significantly) the Goondiwindi traffic to pass through Leyburn. In the 1900s that too was destroyed with the building of the South Western railway line known as the Border Fence from Warwick to Goondiwindi (later extended to Dirranbandi).

The shingle roofed playshed was erected in 1883 to the west of the school house and teachers residence (erected adjacent to school house by 1877). Tenders for the erection of a playshed at Leyburn school were called in late 1882 by the local school committee according to plans and specification supplied by the Department of Public Instruction. It appears that the specifications may have been altered to allow for hardwood other than ironbark to be used as the committee advised that it was impossible to procure ironbark at the local sawmill.

William Clark's tender of £151 completion in 6 months, although not the lowest, was accepted apparently on the advice of the Superintendent of Buildings who advised that Clark performed excellent work for the department and is now engaged at erecting a new School at Merritts Creek. He also noted that material must be very difficult to procure at Leyburn as the prices generally are very high. By comparison for example a similar playshed with shingled roof was erected at Kalkie State School in 1879 at the cost of £59.

"Playshed" is the name used officially as well as colloquially for these structures. They were commonly associated with early lowset schools and were superseded by the innovation of raising the school buildings on high stumps to provide shelter underneath. More recently however shade structures within the school playground have enjoyed a renaissance. Playsheds were not designed to facilitate any particular game (although the board for the game of "Stones and Glasses" has been engraved on two of benches in the playshed) but rather were more general purpose spaces. In Queensland they were a response to the climate as well as a mechanism for dealing with a fluctuating number of enrolments.

Timber flooring was added to the playshed in 1887. The words "All are Welcome" painted on one beam are believed to have been added in the early twentieth century. In 1973 and 1974 the playshed was reshingled with 10,000 iron bark shingles by the Parents and Citizens Association. An outline of the playshed forms the school's emblem and appears on T-shirts and sweat shirts worn by the children and used on souvenirs for the 125th jubilee.

The existing (main) school building was opened on 20 October 1934. Following requests from the school committee and the Leyburn and District Progress Association for a new school and residence, the Public Works Department (who were at this time responsible for the building of schools) reported that the school was still sound but one of the most out-of-date on the Downs. It was recommended that the school and residence be sold for removal and new buildings erected in a different position.

The site chosen for the new school and teacher's residence was on Peter Street. Both buildings were erected by Brisbane contractor DWT Holmes according to types developed by the Public Works Department. The school, costing some £283, was (in contrast to its predecessor) a raised timber building (providing play space under the school) with a single classroom for 40 pupils with verandahs back and front, part of which were enclosed to provide hat rooms. This type of school building (described as E/T1) was constructed between 1930 and 1946 and was a continuation of earlier types developed for country schools, although differing from its predecessors in providing more lighting, a lower pitched roof, and wider classrooms. Unlike the sectional schools built by the Department of Public Instruction (which formed the majority of timber schools erected after 1920), this type was not originally designed for expansion.

As a response to both a shortage of teachers and perceived inadequacies in their accommodation (particularly in rural areas), the department constructed during the 1930s a number of new residences. The residences which provided accommodation for married male headteachers were thus used as an incentive to teach in country areas. In addition they were justified as providing a resident caretaker and cleaner of the site. The teacher's residence at Leyburn, costing £700, was described as a standard number 3 type (D/R3) but with brick chimney. Constructed between 1929 and 1950, type 3 residences were timber-framed buildings clad externally with weather boards except for the verandah walls which were single skinned vertically jointed tongue-and-groove boarding. They contained three bedrooms and were generally highset. Atypically the Leyburn residence is lowset.

Soon after the opening of the school, the former school house and residence were sold and removed: the school was purchased by Robert R Colebon and removed to nearby MacIntyre Street where it is still used as a private residence; the teacher's residence was purchased by T Hutton of Pratten.

Since its erection, the school has undergone a number of changes. In 1951 additions costing £544 were undertaken involving the extension of the classroom and verandahs on the northern side of the building; in 1957 part of the eastern verandah was enclosed for use as a library; in 1959 additions costing some £2000 were completed to convert the building into a two classroom school. In 1976 a further addition (to the southern end of the building) included a library and health service room.

The school celebrated its 125th anniversary in 1987; in the same year the pool (used regularly by the local community) was opened. In 1995 approximately 40 children were enrolled with the junior school housed in a prefabricated building adjacent to the main building housing class rooms for the upper grades and offices. In 2015, there were 36 students in Years P-6 with 4 teachers (2 full-time equivalent).

== Description ==
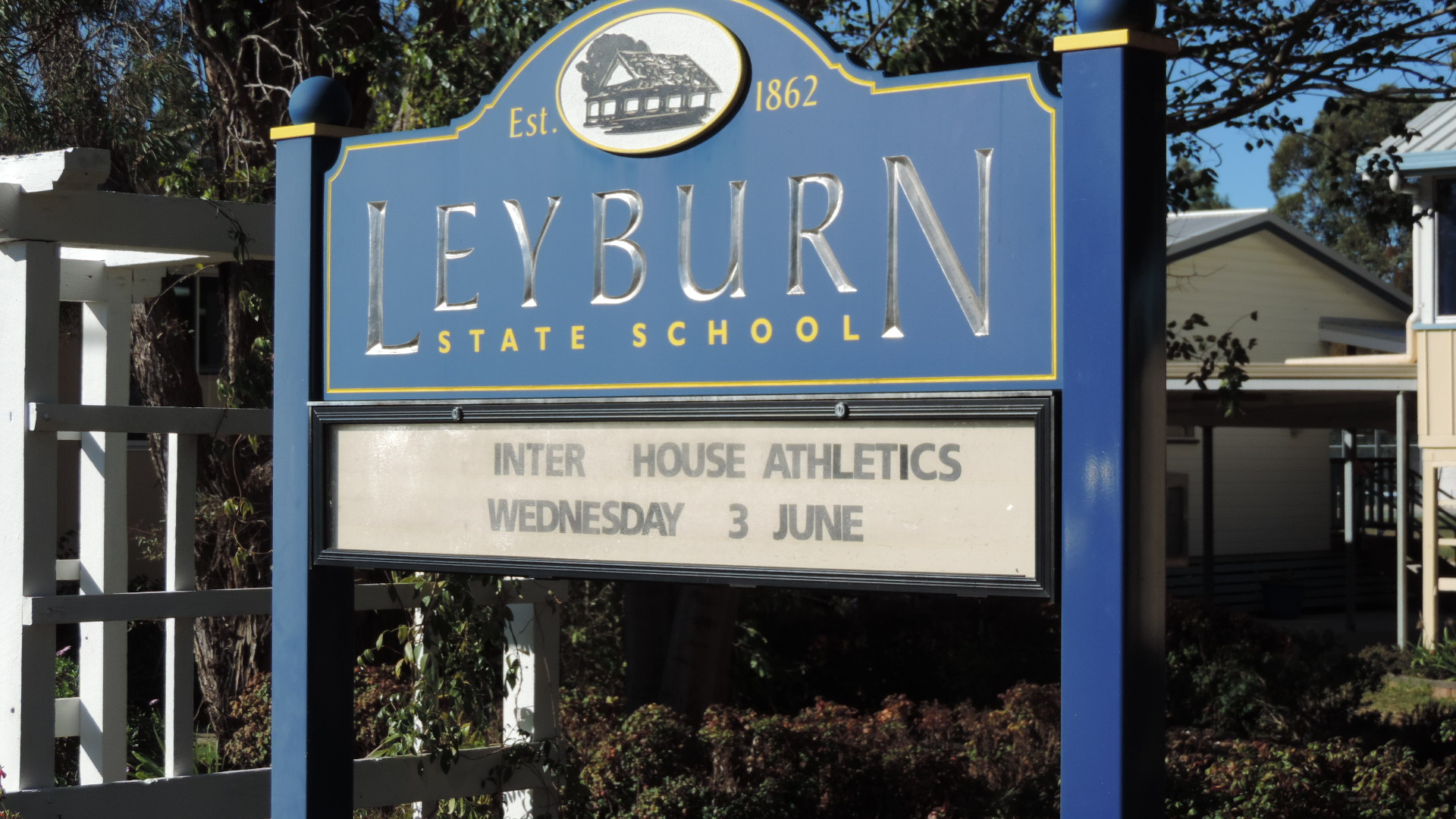
Sign, 2015

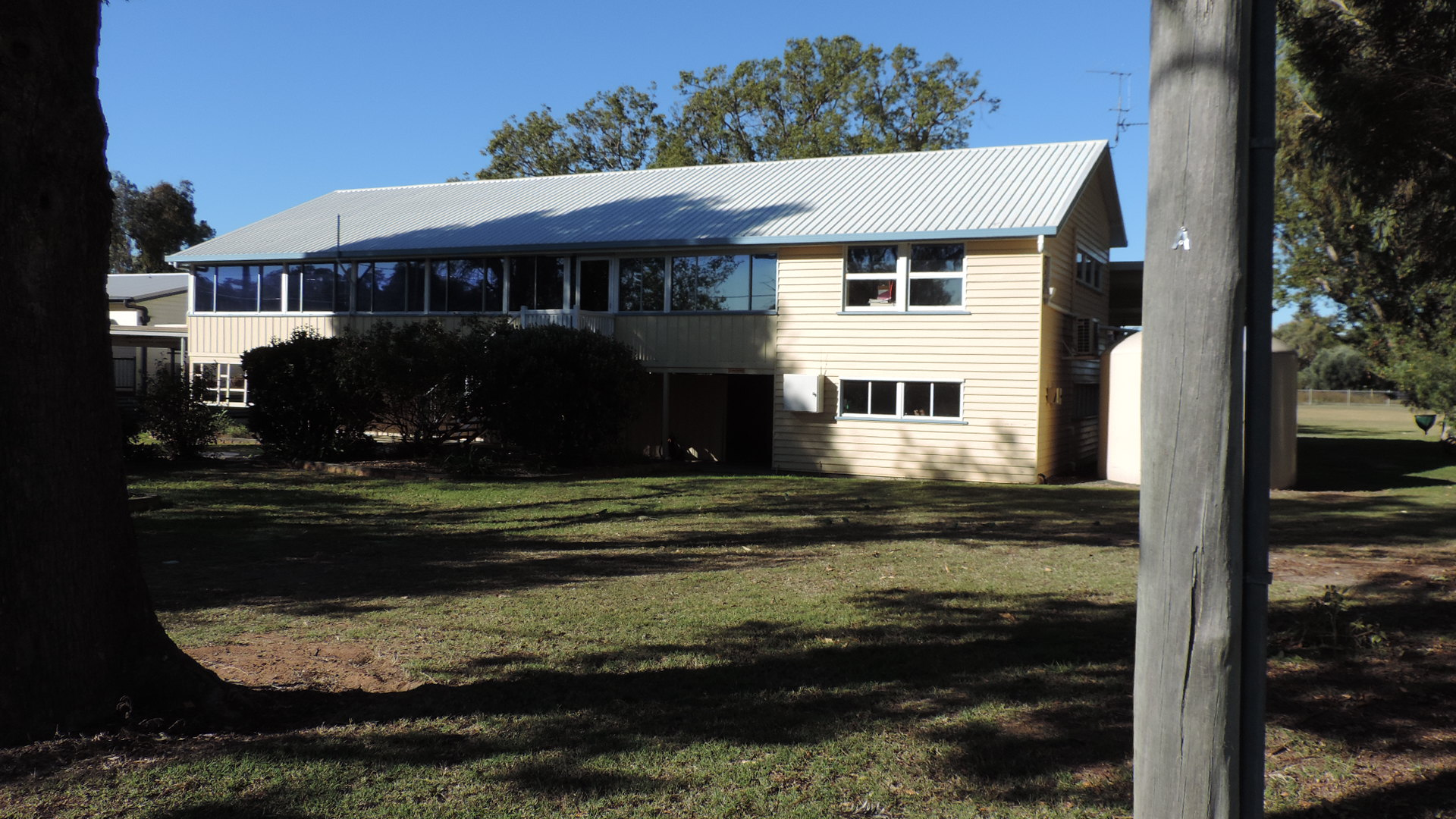
Classrooms, 2015

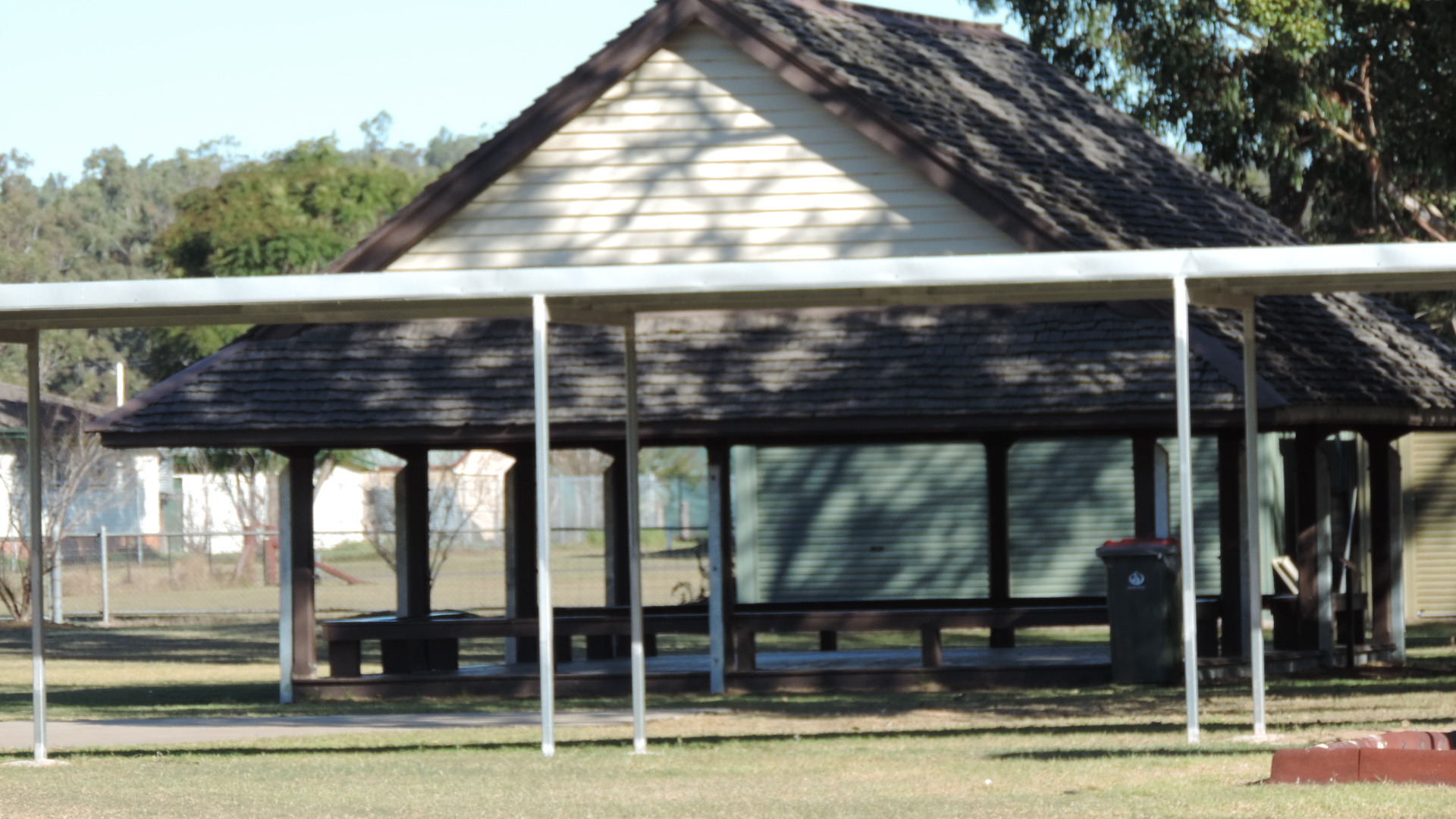
Playshed, 2015

Leyburn is a rural village on the southern reaches of the Darling Downs, some 50 kilometres (31 mi) northwest of Warwick, on the banks of Canal Creek. The school grounds are sited on the western fringe of the township. The school building addresses Peter Street to the west, and nestled behind it beneath a canopy of camphor laurels is the playshed. To the south of the school building is the residence, to the north a demountable classroom block, to the east is the sports field and to the northeast is the tennis court, toilet block, swimming pool and change sheds. There are several silky oak trees to the eastern and western perimeters.

The school building has two classrooms used as one, an office, store and staff area. It is a high set timber building with gabled corrugated iron roof. The original classroom is lined with tongue and groove boards, and the newer areas are lined with fibrous cement sheet. To the west is an open verandah with racks for the children's school bags. There are timber stairs to the front and rear. To the east is a small landing with the original school bell. Underneath is mostly open with remnants of old school furniture.

The playshed is a symmetrical open timber structure, which is rectangular in plan. It has a gabled roof framed in large timber sections and clad in hand-split hardwood shingles. There is wide overhang on all four sides, leaving large gablets clad in weatherboard. There are metal ridge and hip cappings. The roof is supported on ten stop-chamfered square posts, about 140 millimetres (5.5 in) square, which are bolted to buddy posts of a similar size, all set into the ground. There is triangular strutting to these posts which is also stop-chamfered, but some are replaced and some are missing. There are 120-millimetre (4.7 in) square perimeter roof beams, and 190 by 70 millimetres (7.5 in × 2.8 in) tie-beams. Where the struts are missing, the quality of the workmanship is evident in the precision of the recessed housings. As there is no internal linings, the quality of the timber and the workmanship are plainly evident when inside the structure. The words "All Are Welcome" have been painted on the beam on the north side.

There is a raised timber floor, one step above ground level, with 150 millimetres (5.9 in) wide boards. To the perimeter running inside the posts are timber benches, which leave entrance openings to the centre bay to each of the long sides.

== Heritage listing ==
Leyburn State School was listed on the Queensland Heritage Register on 21 October 1992 having satisfied the following criteria.

The place is important in demonstrating the evolution or pattern of Queensland's history.

Established in 1862 and on its present site in 1865, the Leyburn State School (then known as the Leyburn Provisional School) is significant as one of the first of the colony of Queensland's national schools.

Together with the other buildings and sites associated with the development of Leyburn in the nineteenth century, Leyburn State School is a symbol of the more prosperous times of the town and of government's investment in that development.

The Playshed, together with the mature trees and (the second) school building and residence (both erected 1934) are important components which collectively demonstrate the development of the school site.

The place demonstrates rare, uncommon or endangered aspects of Queensland's cultural heritage.

It is a rare example of a surviving timber shingled roofed building made more remarkable by the survival of its shingled Leyburn relative, St Augustine's Anglican Church (1871). Perhaps to a lesser extent, timber-framed buildings constructed with large sections of timber carefully jointed are also now uncommon.

The place is important in demonstrating the principal characteristics of a particular class of cultural places.

The school is an integral part of the Leyburn townscape which presents a remarkably intact example of an early Queensland township which serviced the Darling Downs, Queensland's first settled and richest agricultural district.

Together with playsheds at Brisbane Central State School (1877) and Kalkie State School (1879), the Leyburn Playshed is one of the oldest surviving playsheds, a building type commonly employed in nineteenth century schools.

The school building (described as type E/T1) is a variation of an earlier type which continued to be used for small country schools. The residence is an interwar Type 3 teacher's residence (also described as type D/R3) and is evidence of the continuing departmental policy of the provision of accommodation (for married male head teachers) as an inducement to teach in country areas whilst also providing the school with an onsite caretaker.

The place is important because of its aesthetic significance.

The place is important in demonstrating a high degree of creative or technical achievement at a particular period.

The Playshed has considerable architectural and aesthetic significance: it is a successful marriage of vernacular form and materials and is both a response to climate and a mechanism for dealing with fluctuating enrolments.

The place has a strong or special association with a particular community or cultural group for social, cultural or spiritual reasons.

The school has had a long association with the Leyburn community: as both the centre of local education and a focus for community activity.

The Playshed erected in 1883 has become an emblem of the school and local community.

The place has a special association with the life or work of a particular person, group or organisation of importance in Queensland's history.

The school and residence are significant as examples of building types developed by the Department of Public Works for the Department of Public Instruction.
