= Millmerran, Queensland =

Millmerran
- Town
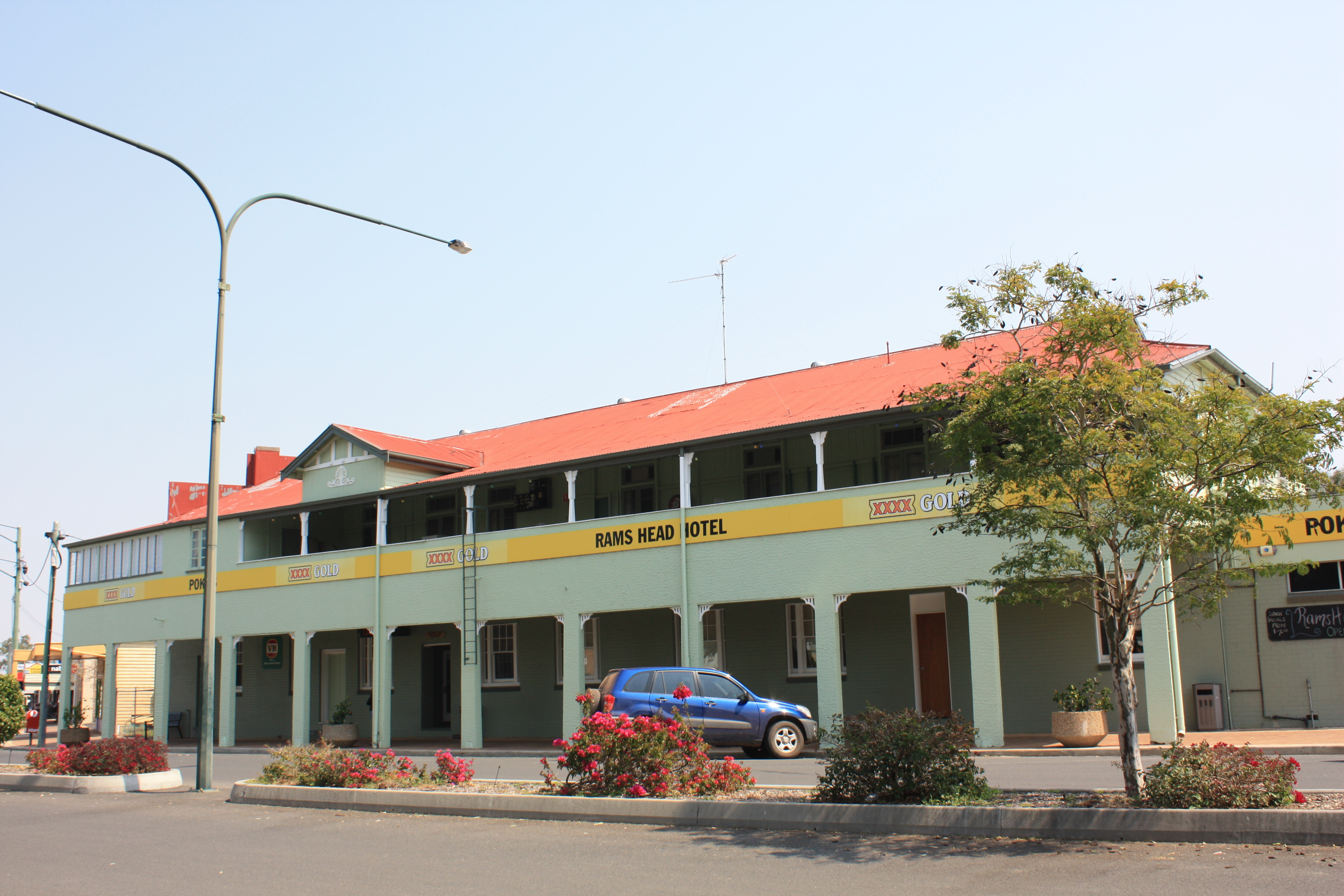
- Rams Head Hotel, Millmerran

- Interactive map of Millmerran
- Coordinates: 27.8788°S 151.2683°E
- Country: Australia
- State: Queensland
- LGA: Toowoomba Region
- Location: 43.5 km (27.0 mi) SW of Pittsworth; 82 km (51 mi) SW of Toowoomba; 108 km (67 mi) NW of Warwick; 214 km (133 mi) WSW of Brisbane

Government
  - State electorate: Southern Downs
  - Federal division: Maranoa

Area
  - Total: 141.1 km^{2} (54.5 sq mi)

Population
  - Total: 1,545 (2021 census)
  - Density: 10.950/km^{2} (28.360/sq mi)
- Time zone: UTC+10:00 (AEST)
- Postcode: 4357
- County: Derby
- Parish: Domville
Localities around Millmerran
Turallin	Lemontree	Yandilla
Captains Mountain	Millmerran	Punchs Creek
Clontarf	Domville	Grays Gate

Millmerran /mɪlˈmɛrən/, known as Domville between 1 June 1889 and 16 November 1894, is a town and a locality in the Toowoomba Region, Queensland, Australia. In the 2021 census, the locality of Millmerran had a population of 1,545 people.

== Geography ==
The town is on the Darling Downs, 208 kilometres (129 mi) west of the state capital, Brisbane. The Gore Highway passes through the locality from the north-east (Yandilla) to the west (Captains Mountain). The Millmerran–Inglewood Road (State Route 82) runs to the south. State Route 82 enters Millmerran from the north-east concurrent with the Gore Highway. The Millmerran–Cecil Plains Road exits to the north.

== History ==
Bigambul (also known as Bigambal, Bigumbil, Pikambul, Pikumbul) is an Australian Aboriginal language spoken by the Bigambul people. The Bigambul language region includes the landscape within the local government boundaries of the Goondiwindi Regional Council, including the towns of Goondiwindi, Yelarbon and Texas extending north towards Moonie and Millmerran. The Giabal (also known as Paiamba, Gomaingguru) language region includes the landscape within the local government boundaries of the Toowoomba Regional Council, particularly Toowoomba south to Allora and west to Millmerran.

Millmerran is near a lookout commonly used by the local Jarowair Nation Aboriginal population prior to European settlement and the town's name is believed to be derived from two words – "meel" meaning "eye" and "merran" meaning "to look out".

European settlement in the Millmerran area began in 1841 when the Gore brothers established the vast Yandilla station. Yandilla station covered an estimated 1,780 square kilometres (690 sq mi) and hosted its own school with 20 to 30 students, telegraph station and store. Closer settlement began after the passing of the Crown Lands Alienation Act in 1876, which allowed Edward Walpole to select a portion of Yandilla station. In 1881, Walpole established a general store on the site of what was known at the time as Back Creek.

Yandilla Provisional School opened on 2 October 1882. In 1901, it was renamed after Millmerran and is now known as Millmerran State School.

A postal receiving office was opened with that name on 8 July 1883. It was elevated to the status of a post office, and the name changed to Domville, on 1 June 1889. The name was again changed to Millmerran on 16 November 1894. (Today, Domville is a rural locality south of Milmerran.)

On Sunday 27 November 1904, St Francis de Sales Catholic Church was officially opened and blessed by Reverend Father Potter. The building was 30 by 20 feet (9.1 by 6.1 m) and was designed by architects Messrs Wallace and Gibson of Warwick. It was built in cypress pine by contractors Messrs Mabbit and Silver. The church was on a 1 acre (0.40 ha) site, half of which was donated by Mr Walpole and the other purchased by the committee. The total cost of the cost was £255. On Sunday 7 November 1952, Bishop Joseph Roper blessed and laid the foundation stone for a new church building. On Sunday 6 July 2915, Roper returned to bless and officially open the new church building which was 85 by 53 feet (26 by 16 m) and capable of seating 300 people. Over 1,000 people attended the event. The architect was Frank Cullen and the builders were Messrs A.D. Morris and Sons. The new church cost £20,500. The 1904 church building was retained as a church hall.

St Alban's Anglican Church was dedicated in 1907. Its closure on 12 June 2007 was approved by Assistant Bishop Nolan.

In 1911, the Millmerran railway line reached the town, which is served by the Millmerran railway station (27.8750°S 151.2688°E).

On Saturday 4 March 1922, a stump-capping ceremony was held for a Presbyterian church. On Friday 9 June 1922, St Andrew's Presbyterian Church was dedicated by the Right Reverend James Gibson, the Moderator-General of the Presbyterian Church of Australia. The architect F. H. Pepper of Sydney provided the design for free and much of the building work was undertaken by volunteers.

St Joseph's School was opened on 16 February 1959 by the Sisters of St Joseph of the Sacred Heart.

The Millmerran Library opened in 1998 with a major refurbishment in 2017.

== Demographics ==
In the 2011 census, the locality of Millmerran had a population of 1,566 people.

In the 2016 census, the locality of Millmerran had a population of 1,563 people.

In the 2021 census, the locality of Millmerran had a population of 1,545 people.

== Education ==
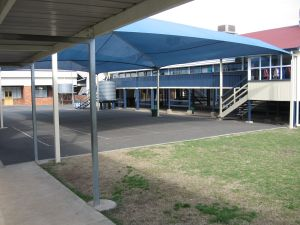
Millmerran State School, 2009

Millmerran State School is a government primary and secondary (Prep–10) school for boys and girls at 19 Simmons Street (27.8782°S 151.2654°E). In 2017, the school had an enrolment of 295 students with 28 teachers (25 full-time equivalent) and 21 non-teaching staff (12 full-time equivalent). In 2018, the school had an enrolment of 323 students with 28 teachers (24 full-time equivalent) and 23 non-teaching staff (13 full-time equivalent).

St Joseph's School is a Catholic primary (Prep–6) school for boys and girls at 25 Walpole Street (27.8725°S 151.2716°E). In 2017, the school had an enrolment of 64 students with 8 teachers (5 full-time equivalent) and 6 non-teaching staff (3 full-time equivalent). In 2018, the school had an enrolment of 59 students with 6 teachers (5 full-time equivalent) and 6 non-teaching staff (3 full-time equivalent).

For secondary education to Year 12, the nearest government school is Pittsworth State High School in Pittsworth to the north-west 43.5 kilometres (27.0 mi) away.

== Amenities ==
Millmerran also has a vibrant town centre with two large grocery outlets, two large hardware stores, a bakery, a 24-bed public hospital, medical centre, modern large equipped sports centre and Olympic-sized swimming pool, and a large community centre complete with ballroom.

The Millmerran Library is operated by the Toowoomba Regional Council. It is located on Herbert Street and is open three days a week (Tuesday, Thursday and Friday).

St Andrew's Presbyterian Church is at 48 Campbell Street (27.8770°S 151.2701°E).

For visitors, there are two caravan parks and an independent camping area for self-contained travelers.

There are a number of parks in the locality:

- Lions Park (27.8743°S 151.2741°E)
- Mcgowan Park (27.8717°S 151.2625°E)
- William Simmons Memorial Park (27.8768°S 151.2590°E)

== Events ==
The Bi-Annual Australian Camp Oven Festival is a nationally known event attracting visitors from all over Australia.
