= Electoral district of Southern Downs =

State electoral district of Queensland, Australia

Southern Downs Queensland—Legislative Assembly
- Electoral district of Southern Downs, 2017
- State: Queensland
- Dates current: 2001–present
- MP: James Lister
- Party: Liberal National
- Namesake: Darling Downs
- Electors: 36,029 (2020)
- Area: 30,951 km^{2} (11,950.2 sq mi)
- Demographic: Regional
- Coordinates: 28°20′S 150°42′E
Electorates around Southern Downs:
Warrego	Condamine	Lockyer
Warrego	Southern Downs	Scenic Rim
New South Wales	New South Wales	New South Wales

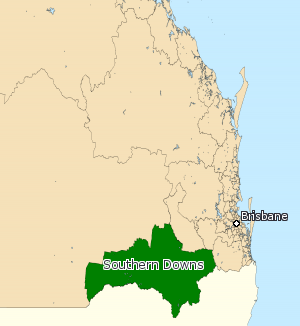
Electoral map of Southern Downs, 2008

Southern Downs is an electoral district represented in the Legislative Assembly of the Australian state of Queensland. It was created in 2001 as a replacement for Warwick.

The district takes in the southern parts of the Darling Downs region along the New South Wales border. It includes the towns of Warwick, Goondiwindi, Stanthorpe, Millmerran and Allora. It also consists of several smaller communities such as Inglewood, Texas, Killarney, Wallangarra and Cecil Plains.

The Darling Downs has traditionally been a conservative area, and Southern Downs is no exception. It has been a safe seat for the Liberal National Party and its predecessor the National Party for its entire existence. Warwick had been in the hands of a non-Labor party since 1947.

The seat's first member, Lawrence Springborg, transferred from Warwick in 2001. He served as the last leader of the Queensland branch of the National Party from January until July 2008, having previously served in the post from 2003 to 2006. He then served as the first leader of the LNP from 2008 to 2009, and again from 2015 to 2016. He also served as a minister in the Newman government.

== Members for Southern Downs ==
Member	Party	Term
Lawrence Springborg	National	2001–2008
Lawrence Springborg	Liberal National	2008–2017
James Lister	Liberal National	2017–present

== Election results ==
2024 Queensland state election: Southern Downs
Party	Candidate	Votes	%	±%
Liberal National	James Lister	17,890	53.91	+2.31
One Nation	Liz Suduk	6,085	18.33	+8.33
Labor	Greg Johnson	5,999	18.08	−7.92
Greens	David Newport	1,870	5.63	+1.53
Family First	Melinda Keller	1,344	4.05	+4.05
Total formal votes		33,188	96.33	
Informal votes		1,265	3.67	
Turnout		34,453	89.18	
Two-candidate-preferred result
Liberal National	James Lister	22,752	68.55	+4.45
One Nation	Liz Suduk	10,436	31.45	+31.45
Liberal National hold		Swing	+4.45	

Raw data
Primary vote results in Southern Downs (Parties that have never gotten 5% of the vote are omitted)
National/Liberal National
Labor
One Nation
Katter's Australian
Greens
Family First
Independent
Raw data
Two-candidate-preferred vote results in Southern Downs
