= Millmerran–Cecil Plains Road =

Road in Queensland, Australia

Millmerran–Cecil Plains Road Queensland

General information
- Type: Rural road
- Length: 45.6 km (28 mi)
- Route number(s): No shield

Major junctions
- South end: Gore Highway Millmerran
- Cecil Plains–Moonie Road
- North end: Dalby–Cecil Plains Road / Toowoomba–Cecil Plains Road Cecil Plains

Location(s)
- Major settlements: Lemontree, Kurrowah

There are two state-controlled roads linking Millmerran and Cecil Plains in the Toowoomba region of Queensland, Australia. They are Millmerran–Cecil Plains Road, which runs to the west of the Condamine River, and Pampas–Horrane Road, which runs east of the river.

== Road west ==
Millmerran–Cecil Plains Road is a continuous 45.6 kilometres (28.3 mi) road route. It is a regional road (number 3251).

== Road east ==
Pampas–Horrane Road Queensland

General information
- Type: Rural road
- Length: 35.8 km (22 mi)
- Route number(s): State Route 82 (Pampas – Cecil Plains)

Major junctions
- South end: Gore Highway Pampas
- Branchview Road
- North end: Toowoomba–Cecil Plains Road Cecil Plains

Location(s)
- Major settlements: Condamine Plains

Pampas–Horrane Road is a continuous 35.8 kilometres (22.2 mi) road route, signed as State Route 82. It is a district road (number 327), rated as a local road of regional significance (LRRS).

== Route description ==
=== Road west ===
The Millmerran–Cecil Plains Road commences at an intersection with the Gore Highway (A39) in the Millmerran CBD. It leaves Millmerran as Charles Street and runs north and north-west, passing between Lemontree and Turallin before running through Kurrowah to Cecil Plains. It turns north-east as it approaches the Cecil Plains CBD, passing the exit to Cecil Plains–Moonie Road. It enters the CBD as Taylor Street, ending at an intersection with Dalby–Cecil Plains Road and Toowoomba–Cecil Plains Road (State Route 82). Land use along this road is mainly crop farming.

=== Road east ===
Pampas–Horrane Road commences at an intersection with the Gore Highway (A39) in Pampas, about 16.9 kilometres (10.5 mi) north-east of the Millmerran CBD. It runs north-west through Condamine Plains to its end at an intersection with Toowoomba–Cecil Plains Road in Cecil Plains, about 3.8 kilometres (2.4 mi) east of the CBD. Land use along this road is mainly crop farming.

== State Route 82 ==
State Route 82 follows a number of separately named roads from Tingoora (near Wondai) to Inglewood. It is not necessarily the best or the shortest or the quickest route between the two terminuses. It was proclaimed as a State Route because, at the time, it was the most convenient route for many users. It is also an example of why motorists in unfamiliar territory should follow a designated route rather than rely on a vehicle navigation system, which may direct them onto less suitable alternative roads.

The route follows Chinchilla–Wondai Road west from Tingoora to Durong, where it turns south to Jinghi. Here the Chinchilla–Wondai Road turns west, while State Route 82 continues south on Jandowae Connection Road to Jandowae. In Jandowae the road name changes to Dalby–Jandowae Road, which continues to the Warrego Highway in the west of Dalby. From there it follows the Warrego Highway to the south-east until it reaches Dalby–Cecil Plains Road, where it continues south.

At a T-junction in Cecil Plains, State Route 82 turns east on Toowoomba–Cecil Plains Road until it reaches Pampas–Horrane Road, (Note: Horrane was a station on the former Cecil Plains railway line. It was situated adjacent to the intersection of Toowoomba–Cecil Plains Road and Pampas–Horrane Road in the locality of Cecil Plains.) where it turns south. Note that many navigation systems will suggest a turn to the west in Cecil Plains, leading to Millmerran–Cecil Plains Road. State Route 82 follows Pampas–Horrane Road to Pampas, where it meets the Gore Highway at a T-junction. From there it follows the Gore Highway south-west to Millmerran, where it turns south on the Millmerran–Inglewood Road. This road continues south to Inglewood, where it meets the Cunningham Highway at a T-junction.

== History ==
Yandilla pastoral run was established in 1842. It was a huge lease of 690 square miles, which equates to 441,600 acres (178,700 ha). It included the area now occupied by Millmerran, and extended north to Kurrowah, just south of Cecil Plains. In 1881 part of Yandilla was selected for the town of Millmerran. The town developed quickly as the commercial centre for the district.

West of the river Kurrowah station was resumed from Yandilla in 1870 and opened for selection. Also in the west, Lemontree pastoral run was established as part of Yandilla in 1841, and in 1887 was opened for settlement.

Cecil Plains pastoral run was established in 1842. In 1877 8,300 acres (3,400 ha) was resumed from the Cecil Plains pastoral run to establish smaller farms. This resumption soon led to closer settlement and a demand for better roads to enable the commercial success of the new farms. Some of this settlement occurred to the east of the river.

A postal receiving office opened in Cecil Plains in 1890, and the first school in 1898. Over time the areas along the two lines of road from Millmerran to Cecil Plains were settled as farms of various sizes. In 1916, Cecil Plains station was acquired by the Queensland government and subdivided for closer settlement, with some parcels reserved for soldier settlers. The new settlers produced mainly wheat and dairy.

A reliable road connection from Millmerran to Dalby, which was the closest railhead until 1919, was needed to provide access to markets and larger items of equipment.

== Major intersections ==
=== Road west ===
All distances are from Google Maps. The entire road is in the Toowoomba local government area.

Location	km	mi	Destinations	Notes
Millmerran	0	0.0	Gore Highway (A39) – northeast – Pampas – southwest – Captains Mountain	Southern end of Millmerran–Cecil Plains Road.
Cecil Plains	44.3	27.5	Cecil Plains–Moonie Road – west – Dunmore, Moonie Highway	
Cecil Plains	45.6	28.3	Dalby–Cecil Plains Road – north – Dalby; Toowoomba–Cecil Plains Road – east – Toowoomba	Northern end of Millmerran–Cecil Plains Road
1.000 mi = 1.609 km; 1.000 km = 0.621 mi

=== Road east ===
All distances are from Google Maps. The entire road is in the Toowoomba local government area.

Location	km	mi	Destinations	Notes
Pampas	0	0.0	Gore Highway (A39) – northeast – Pittsworth – southwest – Millmerran	Southern end of Pampas–Horrane Road.
Condamine Plains	22.4	13.9	Branchview Road – east – Branchview	
Cecil Plains	35.8	22.2	Toowoomba–Cecil Plains Road – west – Cecil Plains CBD (no shield) – east – Toowoomba	Northern end of Pampas–Horrane Road
1.000 mi = 1.609 km; 1.000 km = 0.621 mi

== See also ==
- List of road routes in Queensland
- List of numbered roads in Queensland
