= Ziesemer =

Ziesemer is a surname. Notable people with the surname include:

- Edgar Ziesemer (1895–1971), German cinematographer
- Friedrich Wilhelm Ernst Ziesemer (1897–1972), Australian farmer
- Theodor Martin Peter Ziesemer (1899–1961), Australian farmer

== See also ==
- Ziesmer
