= Gore Highway =

Highway in Queensland, Australia

Gore Highway Queensland
- Gore Highway (green and black)

General information
- Type: Highway
- Length: 197 km (122 mi)
- Route number(s): National Highway A39
- Former route number: National Highway 85

Major junctions
- West end: Leichhardt Highway, 19 kilometres (12 mi) north of Goondiwindi
- Toowoomba Athol Road
- East end: Warrego Highway, Charlton

Location(s)
- Major settlements: Millmerran, Pittsworth

Highway system
- Highways in Australia; National Highway • Freeways in Australia; Highways in Queensland

The Gore Highway is a highway running between Toowoomba and Goondiwindi in Queensland, Australia. Together with Goulburn Valley Highway and Newell Highway, it is a part of the National Highway's Melbourne to Brisbane link. It is signed as National Highway A39.

== History ==
The highway is named after two brothers, St. George Richard Gore and Ralph Thomas Gore who established the Yandilla pastoral run in the area (between Pittsworth and Milmerran), through which the road traverses.

It was elevated to National Highway status in February 1993, and replaced the Cunningham Highway as the main route between Goondiwindi and Brisbane. Interstate traffic was rerouted through Toowoomba and the Warrego Highway as it presented a less steep gradient than via Warwick and Cunninghams Gap, shortening travel time especially for trucks. It was initially designated State Route 85 until February 1993 when National Highway 85 was proclaimed, splitting State Route 85 into two. In 2005 it was given the National Highway A39 designation.

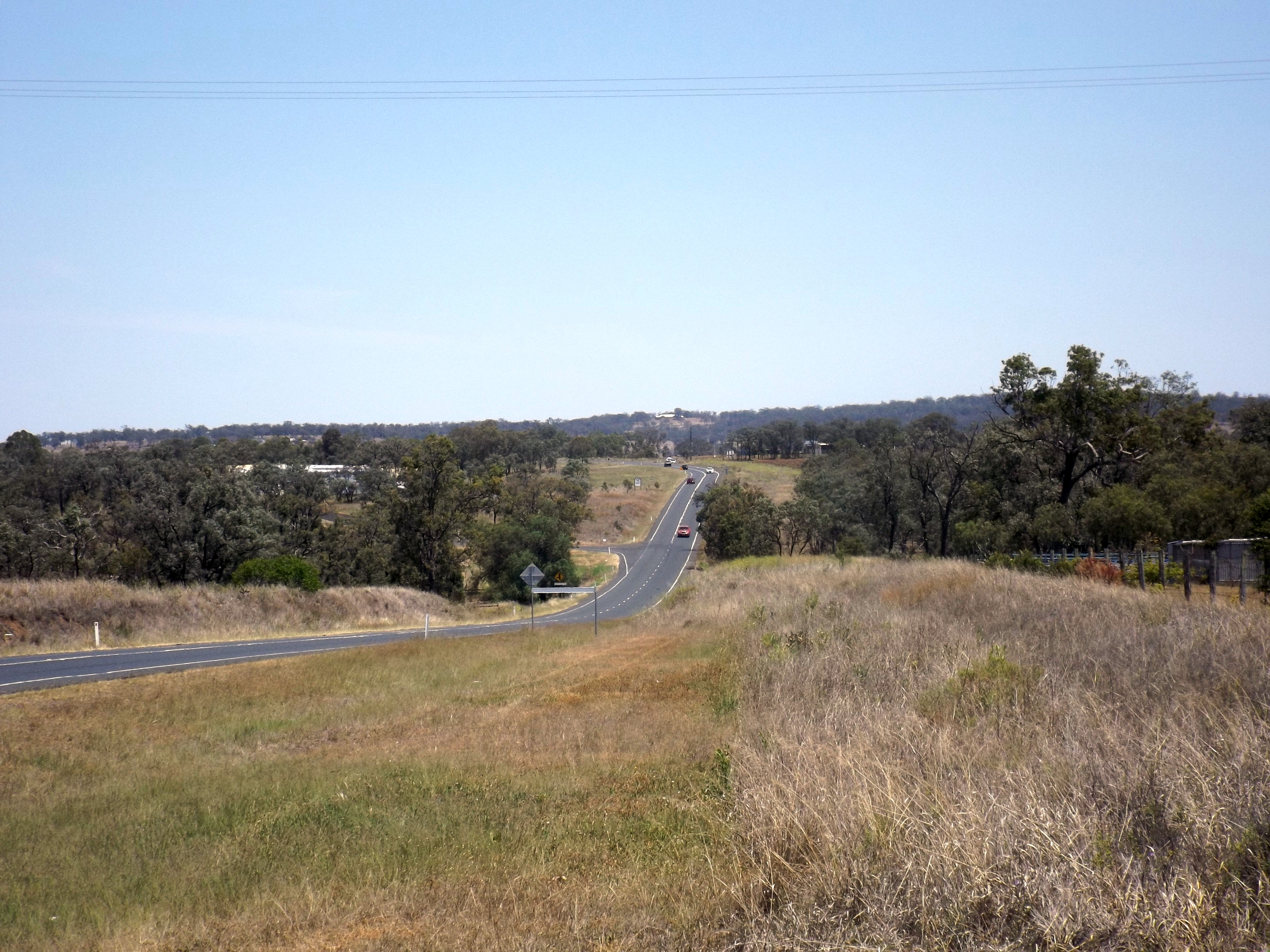
Southbrook, 2014

The Toowoomba Bypass was completed in September 2019. It bypasses the urban area of Toowoomba and provides a better crossing of the Great Dividing Range. Gore Highway (A39) was rerouted via the bypass between Athol (in the south) and the Warrego Highway (A2) interchange at Charlton. The original section of Gore Highway to Toowoomba was renamed Toowoomba Athol Road (A139).

== Route description ==
The highway passes through Queensland's Darling Downs region. Typical of the scenery are grazing cattle, orchards and grain farmland. It is concurrent with State route 85 from Goondiwindi to Athol, and with State route 82 from Milmerran to Pampas.

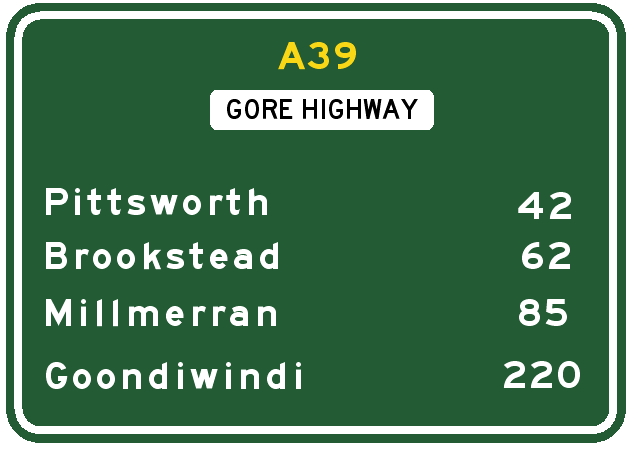
Approximate road distances (in kilometres) of towns from Toowoomba along the highway

=== Speed zones ===
The highway has two different speed zones. From Athol to Millmerran (60 kilometres (37 mi) south west) it is 100 kilometres per hour (62 mph). Between Millmerran and Goondiwindi the maximum permitted speed is 110 kilometres per hour (68 mph).

=== Towns and localities ===
- Goondiwindi
  - Billa Billa
  - Wyaga
  - Kindon
  - Bulli Creek
  - Wattle Ridge
  - The Pines
  - Condamine Farms
  - Cypress Gardens
  - Forest Ridge
  - Millmerran Downs
  - Captains Mountain
- Millmerran
  - Yandilla
- Pittsworth
  - Linthorpe
  - Broxburn
  - Southbrook
  - Umbiram
  - Athol
  - Charlton

== Roads of Strategic Importance upgrades ==
The Roads of Strategic Importance initiative, last updated in March 2022, includes the following projects for the Gore Highway.

=== Road upgrades ===
A lead project to upgrade Queensland sections of the Toowoomba to Seymour corridor, including the Gore Highway and surrounding state and council roads, at an estimated cost of $62.5 million, was to commence in 2020 and is scheduled for completion in mid-2028.

=== Road surface rehabilitation ===
A project for surface rehabilitation of a section of the Gore Highway between Pittsworth and Millmerran at a cost of $17 million is planned to be completed by mid-2023.

== Other upgrades ==
A project to plan safety upgrades on the Gore Highway and the Toowoomba - Athol Road, at a cost of $400,000, was completed in December 2021.

== Major intersections ==
LGA	Location	km	mi	Destinations	Notes
Goondiwindi	Goondiwindi	0	0.0	Leichhardt Highway (State Highway A5) north – Moonie / south – Goondiwindi	Western end of Gore Highway. Intersection is 19 kilometres (12 mi) north of Goondiwindi CBD. Western end of State Route 85 concurrency.
Toowoomba	Milmerran	124	77	Milmerran–Inglewood Road (State Route 82) – Inglewood	Western end of State Route 82 concurrency.
Toowoomba	Pampas	139	86	Pampas Horrane Road (State Route 82) – Cecil Plains	Eastern end of State Route 82 concurrency.
Toowoomba	Athol	184	114	Toowoomba Athol Road (A139) – Toowoomba	Eastern end of State Route 85 concurrency.
Toowoomba	Athol				No entry to Gore Highway northbound from Toowoomba Athol Road
Toowoomba	Charlton	197	122	Warrego Highway (National Route A2) west – Dalby / north – Cranley; Toowoomba Connection Road (A21) east – Toowoomba	Eastern end of Gore Highway.
1.000 mi = 1.609 km; 1.000 km = 0.621 mi: Concurrency terminus; Incomplete access

== Toowoomba Athol Road (A139) ==
Toowoomba Athol Road
- Location: Gore Highway to Toowoomba
- Length: 17.1 km (10.6 mi)
- Existed: 2019–present
- Route number: 139

The Toowoomba Athol Road is a 17.1 km (10.6 mi) former section of the Gore Highway that runs south-west from the city of Toowoomba in Queensland, Australia. With the opening of the Toowoomba Bypass in 2019 the Gore Highway was redirected to part of it, and the bypassed section of the highway was renamed Toowoomba Athol Road and assigned the route number A139.

=== A139 Route description ===
The road commences at an intersection with the Toowoomba Connection Road (A21) on the midpoint of the Toowoomba suburbs of Newtown and Harristown. It runs south-west through the residential suburb of Harristown and the rural suburbs of Drayton and Westbrook to the rural locality of Athol, where it ends at an intersection with the Gore Highway. It is concurrent with State Route 85. There are no major intersections on this road.

=== A139 History ===
In 1849 government surveyor James Charles Burnett prepared a design for the town of Drayton and chose a site 3–4 miles (4.8–6.4 km) to the north-east for suburban allotments of 27–40 acres (11–16 ha). Located where two swampy creeks converged as the headwaters of Gowrie Creek, this area was known as The Swamp/s or the Drayton Swamp, and later as Toowoomba. When preparing the detailed survey of Drayton in 1850, Burnett added a cemetery to the north of the village, midway between Drayton town and the Drayton Swamp suburban allotments, on slightly elevated land close to the road connecting the two settlements. This road, later named Anzac Avenue, is now part of Toowoomba Athol Road.

The Toowoomba Bypass was completed in September 2019 and bypasses the urban area of Toowoomba and provides a better crossing of the Great Dividing Range. The Warrego Highway (A2) was rerouted via the bypass between Helidon Spa (in the east) and an interchange at Charlton (in the west). The Gore Highway (A39) was rerouted via the bypass between Charlton and Athol, and the original section of Gore Highway from Toowoomba to Athol was renamed Toowoomba Athol Road (A139).

== See also ==
- Highways in Australia
- List of highways in Queensland
- List of highways numbered 85
- Drayton and Toowoomba Cemetery
