= Turallin, Queensland =

Turallin
- Town
- Interactive map of Turallin
- Coordinates: 27.8269°S 151.2072°E
- Country: Australia
- State: Queensland
- LGA: Toowoomba Region
- Location: 9.3 km (5.8 mi) NW of Millmerran; 49.5 km (30.8 mi) WSW of Pittsworth; 88.0 km (54.7 mi) WSW of Toowoomba; 220 km (140 mi) W of Brisbane

Government
  - State electorate: Southern Downs
  - Federal division: Maranoa

Area
  - Total: 108.8 km^{2} (42.0 sq mi)

Population
  - Total: 64 (2021 census)
  - Density: 0.588/km^{2} (1.524/sq mi)
- Time zone: UTC+10:00 (AEST)
- Postcode: 4357
Localities around Turallin
Kurrowah	Kurrowah	Lemontree
Western Creek	Turallin	Millmerran
Captains Mountain	Captains Mountain	Millmerran

Turallin is a rural town and locality in the Toowoomba Region, Queensland, Australia. In the 2021 census, the locality of Turallin had a population of 64 people.

== Geography ==
The Millmerran–Cecil Plains Road runs along the eastern boundary of the locality.

The land use is predominantly grazing on native vegetation with the remainder being crop growing on both dry and irrigated land.

== History ==
The town takes its name from a village in Ireland.

Pine Creek Provisional School opened on 4 September 1888. On 27 July 1904, it was renamed Turallin Provisional School. On 1 January 1909, it became Turallin State School. It closed in 1960. It was at 606 Turallin Road (27.8290°S 151.2057°E).

In June 1911, tenders were called to erect an Anglican Church in Turallin. St Luke's Anglican church was dedicated on 20 October 1913 by the Archdeacon of Toowoomba, Arthur Rivers. Its last service was held on 26 July 1953.

== Demographics ==
In the 2016 census, the locality of Turallin had a population of 65 people.

In the 2021 census, the locality of Turallin had a population of 64 people.

== Education ==
There are no schools in Turallin. The nearest government primary school is Millmerran State School in neighbouring Millmerran to the south-east. The nearest government secondary schools are Millmeran State School (to Year 10) and Pittsworth State High School (to Year 12) in Pittsworth to the east.
