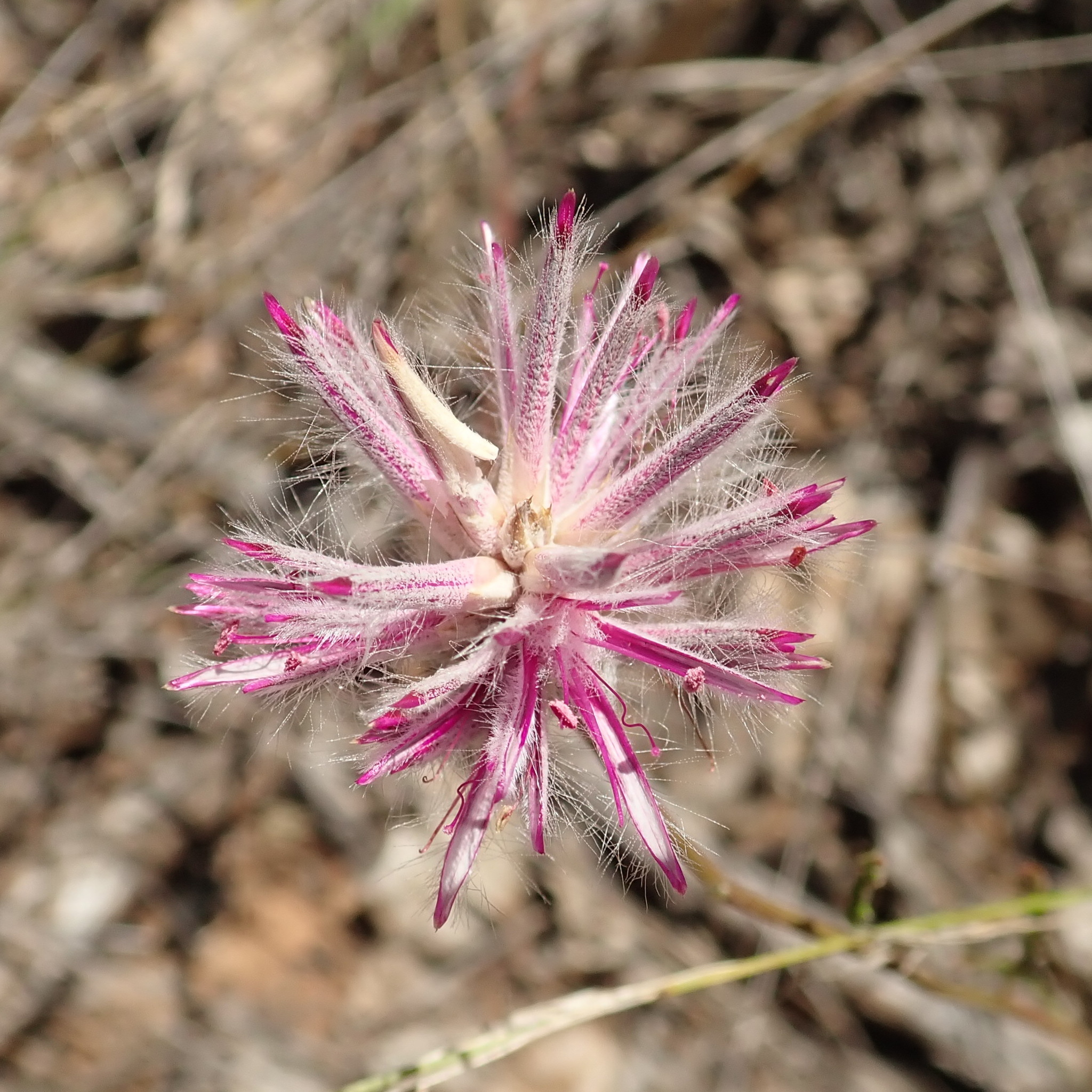
- In Dunmore, Queensland

Scientific classification
- Kingdom: Plantae
- Clade: Embryophytes
- Clade: Tracheophytes
- Clade: Spermatophytes
- Clade: Angiosperms
- Clade: Eudicots
- Order: Caryophyllales
- Family: Amaranthaceae
- Genus: Ptilotus
- Species: P. semilanatus

Binomial name
- Ptilotus semilanatus (Lindl.) F.Muell. ex J.M.Black

Synonyms
- Ptilotus dissitiflorus var. longifolius Benl; Ptilotus exaltatus var. semilanatus (Lindl.) Maiden & Betche; Ptilotus nobilis subsp. semilanatus (Lindl.) A.R.Bean; Trichinium pulchellum (A.Cunn.) ex Moq. Trichinium semilanatum Lindl. Trichinium setigerum (A.Cunn.) ex Moq.

= Ptilotus semilanatus =

Species of herb

Ptilotus semilanatus is a clumping, erect to low-lying perennial herb in the Amaranthaceae family and is endemic to mostly inland areas of eastern Australia. It usually has mostly hairy stems arising from a woody rootstock, lance-shaped leaves with the narrower end towards the base, and pink to mauve spikes of densely arranged flowers.

== Description ==
Ptilotus semilanatus is a clumping, erect to low-lying perennial herb that typically grows to a height of 18–35 cm (7.1–13.8 in) high and has mostly hairy stems arising from a woody rootstock. The leaves at the base of the plant are lance-shaped with the narrower end towards the base, up to 20–60 mm (0.79–2.36 in) long and 3–5 mm (0.12–0.20 in) wide. The stem leaves are similar but shorter and up to 8 mm (0.31 in) wide. The flowers are pink to mauve and densely arranged on an erect, usually hemispherical or oval spike 10–30 mm (0.39–1.18 in) long and 30–40 mm (1.2–1.6 in) in diameter. There are egg-shaped bracts 4–6 mm (0.16–0.24 in) long and similarly sized, broadly egg-shaped bracteoles at the base of the spikes. The perianth is 14–19 mm (0.55–0.75 in) long and covered with long silky hairs, the inner surface mostly glabrous. There are three fertile stamens, the ovary has a few soft hairs on its top, and the style is 9–12 mm (0.35–0.47 in) long. Flowering occurs from October to January.

== Taxonomy ==
This species was first described in 1848 by John Lindley who gave it the name Trichinium semilanatum in Thomas Mitchell's Journal of an Expedition into the Interior of Tropical Australia. In 1948 John McConnell Black reassigned the species to the genus Ptilotus as P. semilanatum after an unpublished manuscript by Ferdinand von Mueller.

== Distribution and habitat ==
Ptilotus semilanatus is endemic to eastern Australia where it is found in Queensland, New South Wales, Victoria, and South Australia. It is widespread in woodlands or grassland on plains where it grows on loamy or clayey soils.
