= Cypress Gardens, Queensland =

Cypress Gardens
- Suburb
- Interactive map of Cypress Gardens
- Coordinates: 27.9733°S 151.0177°E
- Country: Australia
- State: Queensland
- LGA: Toowoomba Region
- Location: 29.2 km (18.1 mi) SW of Millmerran; 72.8 km (45.2 mi) SW of Pittsworth; 111 km (69 mi) SW of Toowoomba; 243 km (151 mi) WSW of Brisbane

Government
  - State electorate: Southern Downs
  - Federal division: Maranoa

Area
  - Total: 9.2 km^{2} (3.6 sq mi)

Population
  - Total: 94 (2021 census)
  - Density: 10.22/km^{2} (26.46/sq mi)
- Time zone: UTC+10:00 (AEST)
- Postcode: 4357
Suburbs around Cypress Gardens
Forest Ridge	Forest Ridge	Captains Mountain
Condamine Farms	Cypress Gardens	Millmerran Downs
Wattle Ridge	Wattle Ridge	Millmerran Woods

Cypress Gardens is a rural residential locality in the Toowoomba Region, Queensland, Australia. In the 2021 census, Cypress Gardens had a population of 94 people.

== Geography ==
The Gore Highway forms the northern boundary of the locality.

The land use is rural residential with large acreage blocks.

== History ==
When the subdivision of approx 80,000 acres (32,000 ha) was established, it was named Condamine Country, but the name was thought inappropriate as there was no connection with the Condamine River. So it was named Cypress Gardens after the cypress pines in the area.

== Demographics ==
In the 2016 census, Cypress Gardens had a population of 92 people.

In the 2021 census, Cypress Gardens had a population of 94 people.

== Education ==
There are no schools in Cypress Gardens. The nearest government primary and secondary school to Year 10 is Millmerran State School in Millmerran to the north-west. The nearest government secondary school to Year 12 is Pittsworth State High School in Pittsworth to the north-west.
