= Kurrowah, Queensland =

Kurrowah
- Suburb
- Interactive map of Kurrowah
- Coordinates: 27.7°S 151.15°E
- Country: Australia
- State: Queensland
- LGA: Toowoomba Region
- Location: 32.5 km (20.2 mi) SSW of Cecil Plains; 33.7 km (20.9 mi) NNW of Millmerran; 71.9 km (44.7 mi) W of Pittsworth; 110 km (68 mi) WSW of Toowoomba CBD; 242 km (150 mi) W of Brisbane

Government
  - State electorate: Southern Downs
  - Federal division: Maranoa

Area
  - Total: 285.6 km^{2} (110.3 sq mi)

Population
  - Total: 10 (2021 census)
  - Density: 0.035/km^{2} (0.09/sq mi)
- Time zone: UTC+10:00 (AEST)
- Postcode: 4352
Suburbs around Kurrowah
Dunmore	Cecil Plains	Cecil Plains
Dunmore	Kurrowah	Condamine Plains
Western Creek	Turallin	Lemontree

Kurrowah is a rural locality in the Toowoomba Region, Queensland, Australia. In the 2021 census, Kurrowah had a population of 10 people.

== Geography ==
The Condamine River forms the eastern boundary of the locality.

Millmerran–Cecil Plains Road enters the locality from the south (Turallin / Lemontree) and exits to the north (Cecil Plains).

The south-west of the locality is within Western Creek State Forest. Apart from that, the predominant land use is grazing on native vegetation, except for the east of the locality along the river where the land use is crop growing.

== History ==
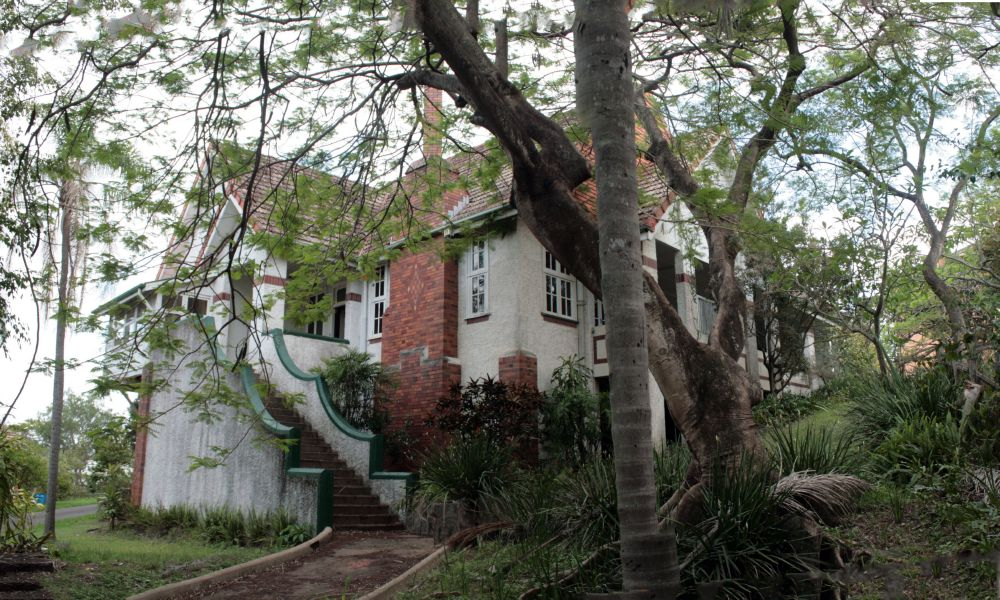
The mansion Kurrowah in Brisbane, 2013

The locality takes its name from a heavily timbered landholding on the Condamine River, resumed from the Yandilla pastoral run and selected by Francis Claudius Brodribb in 1870. It consisted of 53,504 acres (21,652 ha) of plain, river flats and open forest country, with frontage of 13 miles (21 km) to the river. Many thought Brodribb was foolhardy as the land would require so much effort to remove the trees. However, after 30 years of persistence, the property looked like "pleasant park land" and had become known for the good quality of its wool.

Francis Claudius Brodribb had a son Frank Kenric Brodribb, who, having received a large inheritance his father, built the mansion Kurrowah in Brisbane, which is now listed on the Queensland Heritage Register.

== Demographics ==
In the 2016 census, Kurrowah had a population of 25 people.

In the 2021 census, Kurrowah had a population of 10 people.

== Education ==
There are no schools in Kurrowah. The nearest government primary schools are Cecil Plains State School in neighbouring Cecil Plains to the north and Millmerran State School in Millmerran to the south. Both schools also offer secondary education to Year 10. For secondary education to Year 12, the nearest government secondary school is Pittsworth State High School in Pittsworth to the east; however, from some parts of the locality, it may be too distant for a daily commute and the other options are distance education and boarding school.
