= Lemontree, Queensland =

Lemontree
- Suburb
- Interactive map of Lemontree
- Coordinates: 27.7833°S 151.3°E
- Country: Australia
- State: Queensland
- LGA: Toowoomba Region
- Location: 13.5 km (8.4 mi) N of Millmerran; 41.7 km (25.9 mi) WSW of Pittsworth; 78.7 km (48.9 mi) SW of Toowoomba CBD; 210 km (130 mi) W of Brisbane CBD

Government
  - State electorate: Southern Downs
  - Federal division: Maranoa

Area
  - Total: 49.1 km^{2} (19.0 sq mi)

Population
  - Total: 27 (2021 census)
  - Density: 0.550/km^{2} (1.424/sq mi)
- Time zone: UTC+10:00 (AEST)
- Postcode: 4357
- County: Derby
- Parish: Domville
Suburbs around Lemontree
Kurrowah	Condamine Plains	Pampas
Turallin	Lemontree	Pampas
Millmerran	Millmerran	Yandilla

Lemontree is a rural locality in the Toowoomba Region, Queensland, Australia. In the 2021 census, Lemontree had a population of 27 people.

== Geography ==
The Condamine River enters the locality from the east (Yandilla / Pampas) and forms the north-eastern boundary of the locality, before exiting to the north (Kurrowah / Condamine Plains).

Millmerran–Cecil Plains Road enters the locality from the south (Millmerran) and forms the south-western boundary of the locality before exiting to the west (Turallin / Kurrowah).

The land use is predominantly crop growing with some grazing on native vegetation.

== History ==
The name Lemontree comes from a pastoral run in the district, whose name in turn came from the Lemon Tree Lagoon, a place where lemons grew.

Lemontree was part of the original vast Yandilla station established by the Gore brothers, St. George Richard Gore and Ralph Thomas Gore, in 1841. It was opened for settlement under the Crown Lands Alienation Act of 1876 when the Gore lease expired in 1887.

In 1879, it was part of the Jondaryan Division which became the Shire of Jondaryan in 1903. In 1913, along with other lands in and around the town of Millmerran, it became part of the Shire of Millmerran. In 2008, the area was amalgamated into the Toowoomba Region.

== Demographics ==
In the 2016 census, Lemontree had a population of 45 people.

In the 2021 census, Lemontree had a population of 27 people.

== Education ==
There are no schools in Lemontree. The nearest government primary schools are Millmerran State School in neighbouring Millmerran to the south and Brookstead State School in Brookstead to the north-east. The nearest government secondary schools are Millmerran State School (to Year 10) and Pittsworth State High School (to Year 12) in Pittsworth to the north-east.
