= Millmerran Woods, Queensland =

Millmerran Woods
- Suburb
- Interactive map of Millmerran Woods
- Coordinates: 28.0166°S 151.05°E
- Country: Australia
- State: Queensland
- LGA: Toowoomba Region
- Location: 29.3 km (18.2 mi) SW of Millmerran; 72.9 km (45.3 mi) SW of Pittsworth; 111 km (69 mi) SW of Toowoomba; 243 km (151 mi) WSW of Brisbane

Government
  - State electorate: Southern Downs
  - Federal division: Maranoa

Area
  - Total: 19.3 km^{2} (7.5 sq mi)

Population
  - Total: 152 (2021 census)
  - Density: 7.88/km^{2} (20.40/sq mi)
- Time zone: UTC+10:00 (AEST)
- Postcode: 4357
Suburbs around Millmerran Woods
Wattle Ridge	Cypress Gardens	Millmerran Downs
Wattle Ridge	Millmerran Woods	Captains Mountain
Woondul	Bringalily	Bringalily

Millmerran Woods is a rural locality in the Toowoomba Region, Queensland, Australia. In the 2021 census, Millmerran Woods had a population of 152 people.

== Geography ==
The most common land use in the locality is grazing on native vegetation, with the remainder of the locality being rural residential properties.

== History ==
The locality name is derived from the nearby town of Millmerran, which in turn is derived from Aboriginal words in the Gooneburra language with meel meaning eye and merran meaning lookout.

Land parcels of 20 acres (8.1 ha) were sold in 1979 at a cost of $7,800 to $10,400 with a deposit of $750.

== Demographics ==
In the 2016 census, Millmerran Woods had a population of 92 people.

In the 2021 census, Millmerran Woods had a population of 152 people.

== Education ==
There are no schools in Millmerran Downs. The nearest government primary and secondary school to Year 10 is Millmerran State School in Millmerran to the north-east. The nearest government secondary school to Year 12 is Pittsworth State High School in Pittsworth to the north-east, but, given the distance, other options are distance education and boarding school.
