= Pampas, Queensland =

Pampas
- Suburb
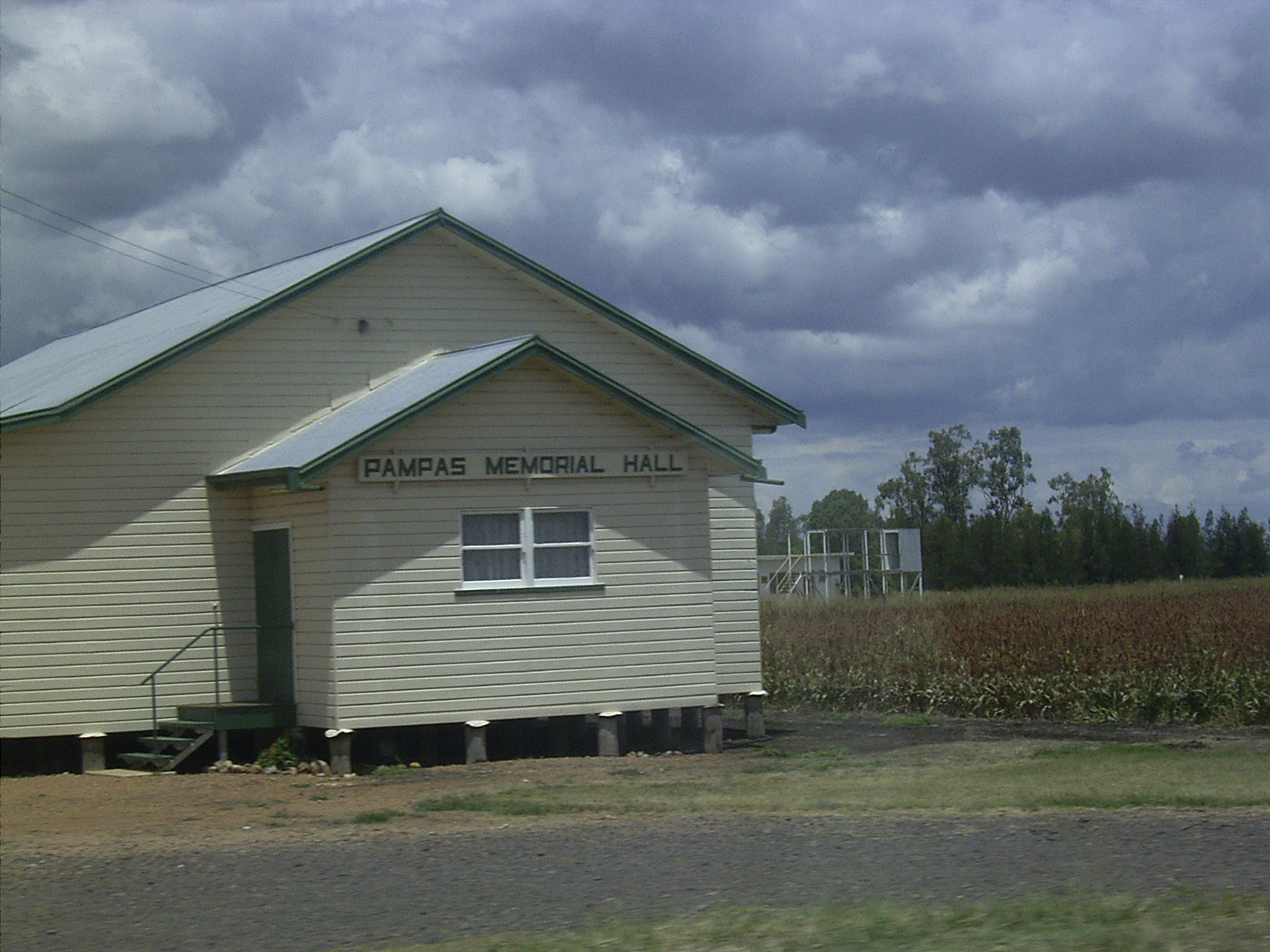
- Pampas Memorial Hall, 2009

- Interactive map of Pampas
- Coordinates: 27.8°S 151.4°E
- Country: Australia
- State: Queensland
- LGA: Toowoomba Region
- Location: 18.2 km (11.3 mi) NE of Millmerran; 25.4 km (15.8 mi) WSW of Pittsworth; 63.8 km (39.6 mi) SW of Toowoomba CBD; 196 km (122 mi) WSW of Brisbane

Government
  - State electorate: Southern Downs
  - Federal division: Maranoa

Area
  - Total: 79.9 km^{2} (30.8 sq mi)

Population
  - Total: 78 (2021 census)
  - Density: 0.976/km^{2} (2.528/sq mi)
- Time zone: UTC+10:00 (AEST)
- Postcode: 4352
Suburbs around Pampas
Condamine Plains	Brookstead	Brookstead
Lemontree	Pampas	Tummaville
Yandilla	Yandilla	Yandilla

Pampas is a rural locality in the Toowoomba Region, Queensland, Australia. In the 2021 census, Pampas had a population of 78 people.

== Geography ==
The locality is positioned between the main channel and north branch of the Condamine River both of which mark boundaries. The Millmerran railway line and Gore Highway pass through Pampas. The Pampas–Horrane Road (State Route 82) runs north-west to Cecil Plains.

The land use is predominantly horticulture and cropping.

== History ==
Pampas is named because of the extensive coverage of kangaroo grass.

Pampas railway station is an abandoned railway station on the Millmerran railway line (27.7916°S 151.4118°E).

The Dry Paddock Provisional School opened on 9 August 1897. In 1909 it became Pampas State School. It closed on 27 December 1957. It was at 22 Fysh Road (27.7912°S 151.4141°E).

Pampas Memorial Hall was erected in late 1954.

== Demographics ==
In the 2016 census, Pampas had a population of 62 people.

In the 2021 census, Pampas had a population of 78 people.

== Economy ==
There are a number of homesteads in the locality, including:

- Bonnie Doon (27.7786°S 151.3895°E)
- Culverthorpe (27.8015°S 151.3853°E)
- Ebrose (27.7931°S 151.3985°E)
- Erindale (27.7757°S 151.4019°E)
- Kyle (27.7585°S 151.3564°E)
- Miraba (27.8202°S 151.4370°E)
- Wictown (27.7796°S 151.4062°E)

== Education ==
There are no schools in Pampas. The nearest government primary school is Brookstead State School in neighbouring Brookstead to the north-east. The nearest government secondary schools are Millmerran State School (to Year 10) in Millmerran to the south-west and Pittsworth State High School in Pittsworth to the north-east.

== Amenities ==
Pampas Memorial Hall is at 6179 Gore Highway (27.7913°S 151.4108°E).
