= Millmerran Downs, Queensland =

Millmerran Downs
- Suburb
- Interactive map of Millmerran Downs
- Coordinates: 27.9833°S 151.0666°E
- Country: Australia
- State: Queensland
- LGA: Toowoomba Region
- Location: 26.2 km (16.3 mi) SW of Millmerran; 69.7 km (43.3 mi) SW of Pittsworth; 108 km (67 mi) SW of Toowoomba; 240 km (150 mi) WSW of Brisbane

Government
  - State electorate: Southern Downs
  - Federal division: Maranoa

Area
  - Total: 8.4 km^{2} (3.2 sq mi)

Population
  - Total: 103 (2021 census)
  - Density: 12.26/km^{2} (31.8/sq mi)
- Time zone: UTC+10:00 (AEST)
- Postcode: 4357
Suburbs around Millmerran Downs
Captains Mountain	Captains Mountain	Captains Mountain
Cypress Gardens	Millmerran Downs	Captains Mountain
Millmerran Woods	Millmerran Woods	Captains Mountain

Millmerran Downs is a rural locality in the Toowoomba Region, Queensland, Australia. In the 2021 census, Millmerran Downs had a population of 103 people.

== Geography ==
The Gore Highway forms the northern boundary of the locality.

The land use in the locality is predominantly rural residential housing with large acreage properties. Some of the land parcels are used for grazing on native vegetation and growing crops.

== History ==
The locality name is derived from the nearby town of Millmerran, which in turn is derived from Aboriginal words in the Gooneburra language with meel meaning eye and merran meaning lookout.

== Demographics ==
In the 2016 census, Millmerran Downs had a population of 89 people.

In the 2021 census, Millmerran Downs had a population of 103 people.

== Education ==
There are no schools in Millmerran Downs. The nearest government primary and secondary school to Year 10 is Millmerran State School in Millmerran to the north-east. The nearest government secondary school to Year 12 is Pittsworth State High School in Pittsworth to the north-east, but, given the distance, other options are distance education and boarding school.
