= Condamine Plains, Queensland =

Condamine Plains
- Suburb
- Interactive map of Condamine Plains
- Coordinates: 27.6666°S 151.2833°E
- Country: Australia
- State: Queensland
- LGA: Toowoomba Region
- Location: 21.7 km (13.5 mi) SE of Cecil Plains; 35.4 km (22.0 mi) N of Millmerran; 40.1 km (24.9 mi) W of Pittsworth; 80.4 km (50.0 mi) W of Toowoomba CBD; 221 km (137 mi) W of Brisbane

Government
  - State electorate: Southern Downs
  - Federal division: Maranoa

Area
  - Total: 178.1 km^{2} (68.8 sq mi)

Population
  - Total: 101 (2021 census)
  - Density: 0.5671/km^{2} (1.469/sq mi)
- Time zone: UTC+10:00 (AEST)
- Postcode: 4352
Suburbs around Condamine Plains
Cecil Plains	Nangwee	Branchview
Kurrowah	Condamine Plains	Brookstead
Kurrowah	Lemontree	Pampas

Condamine Plains is a rural locality in the Toowoomba Region, Queensland, Australia. In the 2021 census, Condamine Plains had a population of 101 people.

== Geography ==
The locality is bounded to the west by the Condamine River.

The Pampas-Horrane Road (State Route 82) enters the locality from north-west (Cecil Plains) and exits to the south-east (Pampas).

The land use is mostly crop growing with some grazing on native vegetation.

== History ==
The locality takes its name from the pastoral station in the district.

Condamine Plains Provisional School opened on 14 October 1947. It became Condamine Plains State School in 1959. It closed on 19 May 1961. It was on the Pampas Horrane Road (approx 27.7057°S 151.32812°E).

== Demographics ==
In the 2016 census, Condamine Plains had a population of 103 people.

In the 2021 census, Condamine Plains had a population of 101 people.

== Education ==
There are no schools in Condamine Plains. The nearest government primary schools are Cecil Plains State School in neighbouring Cecil Plains to the north-west and Brookstead State School in neighbouring Brookstead to the west. The nearest government secondary schools are Cecil Plains State School (to Year 10) in Cecil Plains, Millmerran State School (to Year 10) in Millmerran to the south, and Pittsworth State High School (to Year 12) in Pittsworth to the east.
