= Forest Ridge, Queensland =

Forest Ridge
- Suburb
- Interactive map of Forest Ridge
- Coordinates: 27.9666°S 151.0166°E
- Country: Australia
- State: Queensland
- LGA: Toowoomba Region
- Location: 29.4 km (18.3 mi) SW of Millmerran; 72.7 km (45.2 mi) SW of Pittsworth; 111 km (69 mi) SW of Toowoomba; 240 km (150 mi) WSW of Brisbane

Government
  - State electorate: Southern Downs
  - Federal division: Maranoa

Area
  - Total: 4.8 km^{2} (1.9 sq mi)

Population
  - Total: 30 (2021 census)
  - Density: 6.3/km^{2} (16.2/sq mi)
- Time zone: UTC+10:00 (AEST)
- Postcode: 4357
Suburbs around Forest Ridge
Condamine Farms	Captains Mountain	Captains Mountain
Condamine Farms	Forest Ridge	Captains Mountain
Cypress Gardens	Cypress Gardens	Cypress Gardens

Forest Ridge is a rural locality in the Toowoomba Region, Queensland, Australia. In the 2021 census, Forest Ridge had a population of 30 people.

== Geography ==
The land use is rural residential with large acreage blocks.

The Gore Highway forms the southern boundary of the locality.

== Demographics ==
In the 2016 census, Forest Ridge had a population of 49 people.

In the 2021 census, Forest Ridge had a population of 30 people.

== Education ==
There are no schools in Forest Ridge. The nearest government primary and secondary school to Year 10 is Millmerran State School in Millmerran to the north-east. The nearest government secondary school to Year 12 is Pittsworth State High School in Pittsworth, also to the north-east, but it may be too distant for a daily commute with distance education and boarding school being alternatives.
