= Western Creek =

Western Creek may refer to

- Western Creek, Queensland
- Western Creek, Tasmania
