= Ziesmer =

Ziesmer is a surname. Notable people with the surname include:

- Jerry Ziesmer (1939–2021), American film director, production manager, and actor
- Santiago Ziesmer (born 1953), Spanish-born German actor and film actor

== See also ==
- Ziesemer
