= Condamine Farms, Queensland =

Condamine Farms
- Suburb
- Interactive map of Condamine Farms
- Coordinates: 27.95°S 150.9666°E
- Country: Australia
- State: Queensland
- LGA: Toowoomba Region
- Location: 39.8 km (24.7 mi) WSW of Millmerran; 83.4 km (51.8 mi) WSW of Pittsworth; 122 km (76 mi) WSW of Toowoomba; 252 km (157 mi) WSW of Brisbane

Government
  - State electorate: Southern Downs
  - Federal division: Maranoa

Area
  - Total: 46.7 km^{2} (18.0 sq mi)

Population
  - Total: 28 (2021 census)
  - Density: 0.600/km^{2} (1.553/sq mi)
- Time zone: UTC+10:00 (AEST)
- Postcode: 4357
Suburbs around Condamine Farms
Western Creek	Western Creek	Captains Mountain
Western Creek	Condamine Farms	Forest Ridge
The Pines	Wattle Ridge	Cypress Gardens

Condamine Farms is a rural locality in the Toowoomba Region, Queensland, Australia. In the 2021 census, Condamine Farms had a population of 28 people.

== Geography ==
The land is mostly undeveloped. The predominant land use is grazing on native vegetation with some crop growing.

== History ==
The locality was named for being in the vicinity of the Condamine River, although the river flows approx 40 kilometres (25 mi) to the north-east of the locality.

== Demographics ==
In the 2016 census, Condamine Farms had a population of 23 people.

In the 2021 census, Condamine Farms had a population of 28 people.

== Education ==
There are no schools in Condamine Farms. The nearest government primary schools are Kindon State School in Kindon to the south-east and Millmerran State School in Millmerran to the north-east. The nearest government secondary schools are Millmerran State School (to Year 10). There are no nearby schools providing secondary education to Year 12; distance education and boarding schools are the alternatives.
