= The Pines, Queensland =

The Pines
- Suburb
- Interactive map of The Pines
- Coordinates: 27.9733°S 150.9677°E
- Country: Australia
- State: Queensland
- LGA: Toowoomba Region
- Location: 35.2 km (21.9 mi) SW of Millmerran; 78.5 km (48.8 mi) WSW of Pittsworth; 117 km (73 mi) WSW of Toowoomba; 246 km (153 mi) WSW of Brisbane

Government
  - State electorate: Southern Downs
  - Federal division: Maranoa

Area
  - Total: 5.2 km^{2} (2.0 sq mi)

Population
  - Total: 41 (2021 census)
  - Density: 7.88/km^{2} (20.4/sq mi)
- Time zone: UTC+10:00 (AEST)
- Postcode: 4357
Suburbs around The Pines
Condamine Farms	Condamine Farms	Condamine Farms
Western Creek	The Pines	Condamine Farms
Wattle Ridge	Wattle Ridge	Wattle Ridge

The Pines is a locality in the Toowoomba Region, Queensland, Australia. In the 2021 census, The Pines had a population of 41 people.

== Geography ==
The land use is rural residential with large acreage blocks.

== Demographics ==
In the 2016 census, The Pines had a population of 48 people.

In the 2021 census, The Pines had a population of 41 people.

== Education ==
There are no schools in The Pines. The nearest government primary and secondary school to Year 10 is Millmerran State School (to Year 10) in Millmerran and the nearest government secondary school to Year 12 is Pittsworth State High School in Pittsworth.
