= Pittsworth Shire Council Chambers and Shire Hall =

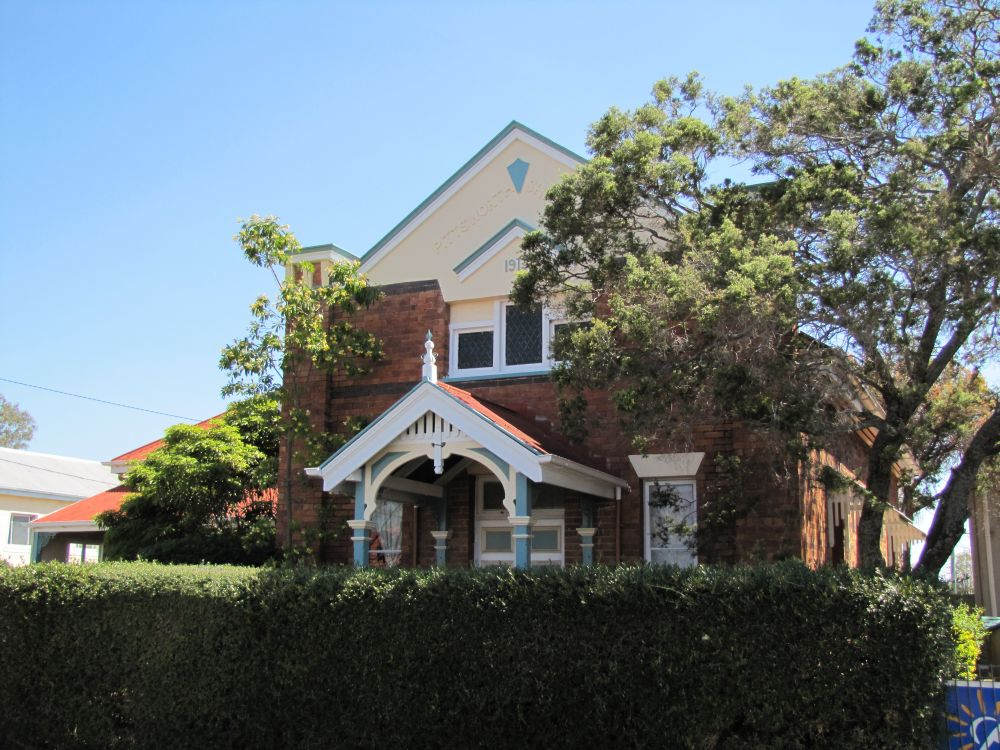
- Picture of the hall from 2012

- Location within Queensland Location within Australia
- 27.7168°S 151.6343°E
- Location: Short Street, Pittsworth, Toowoomba Region, Queensland, Australia

History
- Design period: 1900–1914 (early 20th century)
- Built: 1913–1914

Site notes
- Architectural style: Classicism

Queensland Heritage Register
- Official name: Pittsworth Shire Council Chambers and Shire Hall (former), Pittsworth Kindergarten
- Type: state heritage (built)
- Designated: 28 May 1999
- Reference no.: 601916
- Significant period: 1913–1956 (historical); 1913–ongoing (social)
- Significant components: council chamber/meeting room, views to, lead light/s, office/s, strong room
- Builders: John Fortune

Pittsworth Shire Council Chambers and Shire Hall is a heritage-listed former town hall at Short Street, Pittsworth, Toowoomba Region, Queensland, Australia. It was built from 1913 to 1914 by John Fortune. It is also known as Pittsworth Kindergarten. It was added to the Queensland Heritage Register on 28 May 1999.

== History ==
Located in Short Street, the former Pittsworth Shire Council Chambers and Shire Hall building, constructed in 1914, was designed by WP Copp and built by John Fortune.

Most of the former Shire of Pittsworth originally formed part of the Beauaraba Pastoral Run. The Beauaraba Run was taken up by Charles Mallard in 1847. The station gave the town its name "Beauaraba". The Agricultural Selection Acts of 1868–1876 opened up the area to grain-growers and mixed farmers. In 1876 J Tyson Doneley, nephew of the Felton squatter, built the Beauaraba Hotel to serve the pastoral employees of the surrounding freehold estates and it was at this time that the town began to grow. After the railway from Toowoomba arrived in 1887, the town made rapid progress. Within three years, three more hotels, four stores, two butchers, a bank, two churches and two blacksmiths had been established. Coaches stopped at Pittsworth on the way through to Domville (Millmerran), Bark Creek and Leyburn. Wool from the south-western Downs stations was also carted to the railhead at Pittsworth. In 1886 the name changed to Pittsworth, a name which was suggested by Thomas Macdonald-Paterson, Post-Master General, in honour of his father-in-law, WC Pitts.

A Reserve for Divisional Board Offices in the town of Beauaraba (Pittsworth) was created on 16 August 1890 and advertised in the Government Gazette on 23 August 1890. The Reserve was placed under the control of the Pittsworth Shire Council on 7 March 1918.

Following closer settlement and the establishment of the Divisional Boards Act of 1879 a number of Divisional Boards were created. The Pittsworth area was originally part of the Jondaryan Shire, however, following representations to the Department of Local Government, a ballot was held, with the result that Pittsworth was proclaimed a local authority. Pittsworth Shire Council was established in 1913 and the first meeting of the new Council was held on 9 July 1913. The first Chairman was Mr WP Copp. Councillors were AC Krieg, DV Hannay, C McIntyre, J Holmes, JN Ronnfeldt, JT Stirling, WJ Crawford and W Sullivan.

At the Council meeting of 3 December 1913, Cr Krieg gave notice of motion that he intended to move at the next meeting that the matter of building a Shire Hall be considered. At the meeting of 18 February 1914 it was moved that plans and specifications be obtained both for a wood and brick building, to be ready for to be ready for next meeting. At the meeting of 25 March 1914, WP Copp, submitted his design for the proposed Shire Hall.

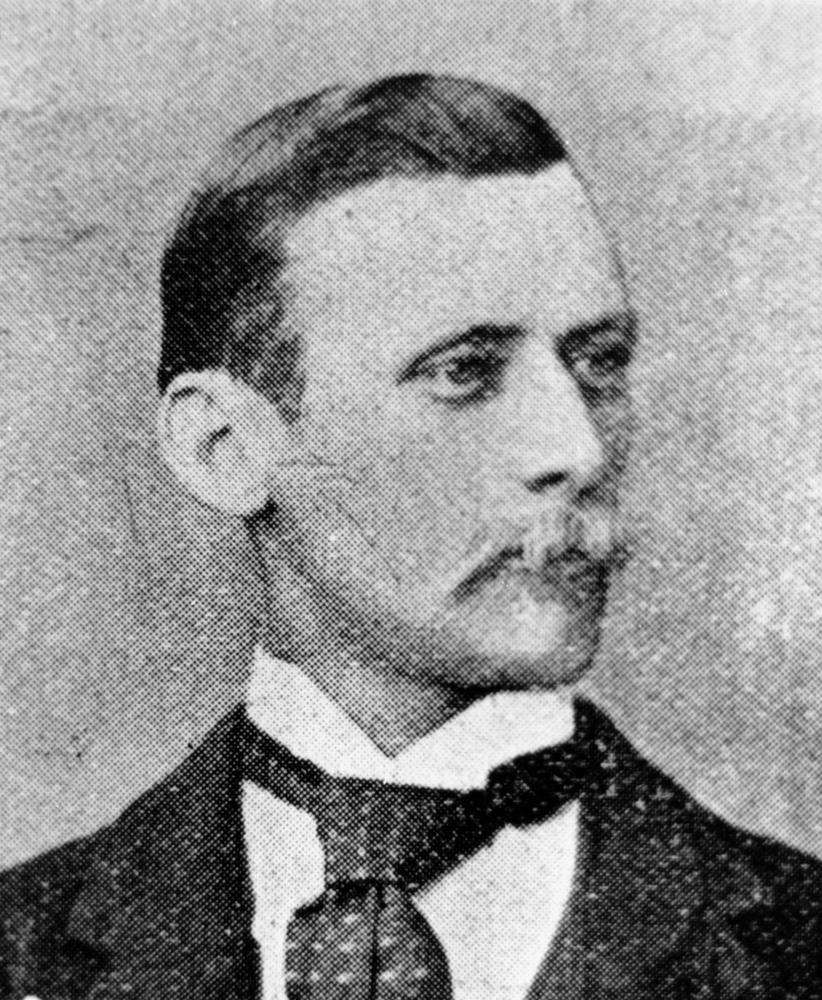
W. P. Copp

William Perham Copp was born in the Logan River district, Queensland in 1868 and settled in the Pittsworth area in 1887. Copp was working as a builder and contractor by 1892, later expanding his activities to include cabinet-making. From 1915 he practised as an architect in Pittsworth. Copp was a member for the local Shire Councils from c. 1898 until his death in 1919. Following his death, in Toowoomba on 24 February 1919, he was described in The Queenslander as "one of Pittsworth's best known residents".

Five tenders for the Shire Hall were received by the Council. John Fortune, listed in the Queensland Post Office Directories in 1914–15 as a "Contractor", was successful in his tender for a brick building at a cost of £766/5/0. Council moved that as rent from its allotment became payable, it was to be banked in a separate account and be reserved as a building fund.

Besides its use as the meeting place for the Shire Council, over many years, the building was the venue for a number of functions including balls, lectures and meetings. For many years, it was one of only a handful of brick buildings in the town. Following a disastrous fire in the main street of Pittsworth in 1923 an area was proclaimed in Yandilla Street whereby plans for all proposed buildings had to be submitted to Council for approval. As a result, a number of brick buildings were constructed in Pittsworth following the fire.

In the 1950s the use of the building for social occasions began to decline, leaving only the monthly shire council meetings. One of the last functions held in the hall was a Naturalisation Ceremony held on 26 September 1955. The new civic centre was built in Yandilla Street and opened in August 1956. The civic centre included new council chambers and a new town hall and were built on land donated by the local Returned Services League.

Externally, the building has undergone few changes over the past 85 years. Small changes have included closing over the open south side of the verandah. Also, to the verandah, timber balusters have been added to the rails. The rails form part of the original design of the building. An extension, housing toilet facilities, was added to the western part of the building by the Kindergarten Association.

The building served the Pittsworth Shire Council for over 40 years. The property description was changed to Lot 10 on P21017 on 18 October 1956 and the building was leased to the Pittsworth Kindergarten Association. The Association continues to lease the building from the Shire Council.

== Description ==
The former Pittsworth Shire Hall and Shire Offices, located in Short Street, is a single storey L-shaped brick building with a corrugated iron roof. The front entrance is centrally located under a projecting portico with gabled roof sheeted with corrugated iron. The portico has moulded timber posts. Decorated leadlight windows are located high in the eastern facade. The concrete gabled parapet, which forms part of the eastern facade includes the words "Pittsworth Shire Hall" and, underneath, "1913". A staircase is positioned on the southern side of the entrance portico. A verandah, with timber posts, is located facing east on the southern side of the building. The verandah has timber balustrades which are a later addition.

The building is constructed of predominantly orange face brickwork, however two bands of decorative blue brick are located in sections along all elevations. On the rear (western) elevation, besides having two decorative bands of blue brick, there are several bands (about ten) of the same blue brick at the top of the facade.

Internally the building has a large open space with high timber ceiling with a pressed metal ceiling rose. The original strong room, located in the north-western corner, is concrete lined and continues to the ceiling, a timber door above the strong room opens to storage space. Two small rooms are located on the southern side of the buildings, one room contains a kitchenette and the other houses office equipment. A timber extension clad with galvanised iron has been constructed along part of the western facade.

Externally, the area to the north of the building contains play equipment and seating areas. A timber shed is located in the north-western corner of the block. A timber framed toilet with corrugated iron roof is located near the north-west corner of the building. A number of trees and plantings surround the block.

== Heritage listing ==
Pittsworth Shire Council Chambers and Shire Hall (former) was listed on the Queensland Heritage Register on 28 May 1999 having satisfied the following criteria.

The place is important in demonstrating the evolution or pattern of Queensland's history.

Constructed in 1914, the former Pittsworth Shire Council Chambers and Shire Hall building, one of the most significant buildings in Pittsworth, is important for its association with the establishment of the Pittsworth Shire Council in 1913. The construction of a substantial brick building demonstrates the high level of confidence the members of the Council held for the future of their new Shire.

The place demonstrates rare, uncommon or endangered aspects of Queensland's cultural heritage.

The former Pittsworth Shire Council Chambers and Shire Hall is significant as one of the few brick buildings constructed in Pittsworth prior to the fire of 1923 which destroyed many timber buildings resulting in a predominance of brick ones being constructed.

The place is important because of its aesthetic significance.

The former Pittsworth Shire Council Chambers and Shire Hall building is significant for its contribution to the Short Street streetscape. The building remains highly intact externally, with only minor changes over the last 85 years.

The place has a special association with the life or work of a particular person, group or organisation of importance in Queensland's history.

The former Pittsworth Shire Council Chambers and Shire Hall building is significant for its association with WP Copp, Chairman of the first Shire Council and prominent figure in the area. Copp worked as an architect in Pittsworth from 1915–19 and designed the building for the Shire Council.
