= Gavin Whittaker =

Australian rugby league footballer

Personal information
- Full name: Gavin Whittaker
- Born: 13 January 1970 Pittsworth, Queensland, Australia
- Died: 6 January 2017 (aged 46) Parkwood, Queensland, Australia

Playing information
- Position: Prop
Club
Years	Team	Pld	T	G	FG	P
1993–95	Canterbury-Bankstown	7	0	0	0	0
1996–97	Gold Coast	30	3	2	0	16
	Total	37	3	2	0	16

Gavin Whittaker (13 January 1970 – 6 January 2017) was an Australian professional rugby league footballer who played for Canterbury-Bankstown and the Gold Coast.

== Background ==
Whittaker was born on 13 January 1970 in Pittsworth town in Queensland district of Australia.

== Playing career ==
Whittaker made his first grade debut for Canterbury in Round 16, 1993 against Balmain. Whittaker played with the club up until the end of 1995 but was not included in the premiership winning side that defeated Manly.

Whittaker joined the Gold Coast to play 31 games from 1996 to 1998.

His son, Shai Whittaker later played for representative teams from 2007 to 2013; such as the Gold Coast Titans U18's and Queensland U17's.

Whittaker died from stomach cancer on 6 January 2017 at his home in Parkwood, Queensland, a week before his 47th birthday.
