= Weir River, Queensland =

Weir River
- Suburb
- Interactive map of Weir River
- Coordinates: 27.7225°S 150.6358°E
- Country: Australia
- State: Queensland
- LGA: Western Downs Region
- Location: 31.5 km (19.6 mi) E of Moonie; 59.7 km (37.1 mi) S of Tara; 107 km (66 mi) SW of Dalby; 171 km (106 mi) W of Toowoomba; 300 km (190 mi) W of Brisbane

Government
  - State electorate: Warrego
  - Federal division: Maranoa

Area
  - Total: 570.0 km^{2} (220.1 sq mi)

Population
  - Total: 19 (2021 census)
  - Density: 0.0333/km^{2} (0.0863/sq mi)
- Time zone: UTC+10:00 (AEST)
- Postcode: 4406
Suburbs around Weir River
Moonie	Marmadua	Marmadua
Moonie	Weir River	Cattle Creek
Moonie	Boondandilla	Western Creek

Weir River is a rural locality in the Western Downs Region, Queensland, Australia. In the 2021 census, Weir River had a population of 19 people.

== Geography ==
The Moonie Highway enters the locality from the north (Marmadua) and exits to the north-west (Moonie).

The watercourse Weir River enters the locality from the east (the locality of Cattle Creek) and flows westward through the locality, exiting to the west (Moonie).

The Waar Waar State Forest is in the north-west of the locality. There are two sections of the Boondandilla State Forest in the locality, one section in the west of the locality and the other in the south-east of the locality. Apart from these protected areas, the land use is mostly grazing on native vegetation with some crop growing.

== Demographics ==
In the 2016 census, Weir River had a population of 21 people.

In the 2021 census, Weir River had a population of 19 people.

== Education ==
There are no schools in Weir River. The nearest government primary schools are Moonie State School in neighbouring Moonie to the west, Kindon State School in Kindon to the south-east, and Cecil Plains State School in Cecil Plains to the north-east. The nearest government secondary schools are Cecil Plains State School (to Year 9) and Tara Shire State College (to Year 12) in Tara to the north-west. Students in the south of Weir River may be too distant to attend these secondary schools; the alternatives are distance education and boarding school.
