= Cattle Creek, Queensland (Toowoomba Region) =

Cattle Creek
- Suburb
- Interactive map of Cattle Creek
- Coordinates: 27.6666°S 150.8°E
- Country: Australia
- State: Queensland
- LGA: Toowoomba Region
- Location: 45.6 km (28.3 mi) WSW of Cecil Plains; 62.6 km (38.9 mi) ENE of Moonie; 127 km (79 mi) W of Toowoomba; 256 km (159 mi) W of Brisbane

Government
  - State electorate: Southern Downs
  - Federal division: Maranoa

Area
  - Total: 279.9 km^{2} (108.1 sq mi)

Population
  - Total: 21 (2021 census)
  - Density: 0.0750/km^{2} (0.194/sq mi)
- Time zone: UTC+10:00 (AEST)
- Postcode: 4407
Suburbs around Cattle Creek
Marmadua	Halliford	Dunmore
Weir River	Cattle Creek	Dunmore
Weir River	Western Creek	Western Creek

Cattle Creek is a rural locality in the Toowoomba Region, Queensland, Australia. In the 2021 census, Cattle Creek had a population of 21 people.

== Geography ==
The Cecil Plains Moonie Road enters the locality from the east (Dunmore) and exits to the north-west (Weir River / Marmadua).

The Kumbarilla State Forest is in the north of the locality, extending into neighbouring localities of Maradua and Halliford. The Western Creek State Forest in the south of the locality, extending into the neighbouring localities of Weir River, Western Creek and Dunmore. Apart from these protected areas, the land use is mostly grazing on native vegetation with some crop growing.

== History ==
The locality is named after one of the many creeks of that name in Queensland. The locality is on the old Dunmore pastoral run, occupied in the 1840s by Robert Logan.

== Demographics ==
In the 2016 census, Cattle Creek had a population of 19 people.

In the 2021 census, Cattle Creek had a population of 21 people.

== Education ==
There are no schools in Cattle Creek. The nearest government primary schools are Cecil Plains State School in Cecil Plains to the north-east and Moonie State School in Moonie to the west. The nearest government secondary school is Cecil Plains State School (to Year 9). There are no nearby schools offering schooling from Years 10 to 12; the alternatives are distance education and boarding school.
