= Wattle Ridge, Queensland =

Wattle Ridge
- Suburb
- Interactive map of Wattle Ridge
- Coordinates: 28.0000°S 150.9833°E
- Country: Australia
- State: Queensland
- LGA: Toowoomba Region
- Location: 34.3 km (21.3 mi) WSW of Millmerran; 142 km (88 mi) WSW of Toowoomba CBD; 248 km (154 mi) WSW of Brisbane

Government
  - State electorate: Southern Downs
  - Federal division: Maranoa

Area
  - Total: 42.8 km^{2} (16.5 sq mi)

Population
  - Total: 21 (2021 census)
  - Density: 0.491/km^{2} (1.27/sq mi)
- Time zone: UTC+10:00 (AEST)
- Postcode: 4357
Suburbs around Wattle Ridge
Western Creek	The Pines; Condamine Farms	Cypress Gardens
Bulli Creek	Wattle Ridge	Millmerran Woods
Bulli Creek	Woondul	Woondul

Wattle Ridge is a rural locality in the Toowoomba Region, Queensland, Australia. In the 2021 census, Wattle Ridge had a population of 21 people.

== Geography ==
The Gore Highway enters the locality from the north (Condamine Farms / Cypress Gardens) and exits to the west (Bulli Creek).

The land use is grazing on native vegetation.

== Demographics ==
In the 2016 census, Wattle Ridge had a population of 36 people. It included the population of neighbouring Woondul.

In the 2021 census, Wattle Ridge had a population of 21 people. It included the population of neighbouring Woondul.

== Education ==
There are no schools in Wattle Ridge. The nearest government primary schools are Millmerran State School in Millmerran to the north-east and Kindon State School in Kindon to the south-west. The nearest government secondary school is Millmerran State School (to Year 10). There is also a Catholic primary school in Millmerran.There are no schools nearby providing education to Year 12; the alternatives are distance education and boarding school.
