= Captains Mountain =

Mountain in Queensland, Australia

- Location within Australia

Highest point
- Coordinates: 27°55′13.97″S 151°07′10.36″E

Geography
- Location: Millmerran, Queensland, Australia

Captains Mountain is a mountain located in the locality of Captains Mountain near Millmerran in the Toowoomba Region, Queensland, Australia.
