= Pittsworth Sentinel =

Australian weekly newspaper

The Pittsworth Sentinel is a weekly newspaper from Pittsworth, Queensland, Australia. It is published and released every Wednesday. The newspaper started business in 1899.

== Digitisation ==
The paper has been digitised as part of the Australian Newspapers Digitisation Program of the National Library of Australia.
