= Captains Mountain, Queensland =

Captains Mountain
- Suburb
- Interactive map of Captains Mountain
- Coordinates: 27.95°S 151.1°E
- Country: Australia
- State: Queensland
- LGA: Toowoomba Region
- Location: 13.1 km (8.1 mi) SW of Millmerran; 56.6 km (35.2 mi) SW of Pittsworth; 95.1 km (59.1 mi) SW of Toowoomba; 227 km (141 mi) SSW of Brisbane

Government
  - State electorate: Southern Downs
  - Federal division: Maranoa

Area
  - Total: 173.4 km^{2} (67.0 sq mi)

Population
  - Total: 74 (2021 census)
  - Density: 0.4268/km^{2} (1.105/sq mi)
- Time zone: UTC+10:00 (AEST)
- Postcode: 4357
Suburbs around Captains Mountain
Western Creek	Western Creek	Turallin; Millmerran
Condamine Farms; Forest Ridge	Captains Mountain	Clontarf
Cypress Gardens; Millmerran Downs	Millmerran Woods; Bringalily	Millwood

Captains Mountain is a locality in the Toowoomba Region, Queensland, Australia. In the 2021 census, Captains Mountain had a population of 74 people.

== Geography ==
The mountain Captains Mountain is in the north-east of the locality (27.9193°S 151.1549°E) rising to 610 metres (2,000 ft)

The south-west of the locality is Western Creek State Forest. The remainder of the locality is used for farming, mostly grazing but with some cropping.

The Gore Highway passes through the locality from the north-east (Millmerran) and then exits to the south-west forming part of the south-western boundary (adjacent to Cypress Gardens and Millmerran Downs).

== History ==
The locality is presumably named after the mountain Captains Mountain.

In 1914, the Captain's Mountain Co-operative Dairy Company was formed with 275 shares at a cost of £1 each. The company built a cheese factory. In March 1916, the factory processed 3,449 imperial gallons (15,680 L; 4,142 US gal) to produce 3,961 pounds (1,797 kg) of cheese. The factory was still operating in 1931, but was contemplating closure in 1934, and had closed by 1939.

Captain's Mountain Provisional School opened on 30 January 1922, becoming Captain's Mountain State School in 1957. It closed in 1962.

== Demographics ==
In the 2016 census, Captains Mountain had a population of 77 people.

In the 2021 census, Captains Mountain had a population of 74 people.

== Education ==
There are no schools in Captains Mountain. The nearest government primary and secondary school to Year 10 is Millmerran State School in neighbouring Millmerran to the north-east and the nearest government secondary school to Year 12 in Pittsworth State High School in Pittsworth to the north-east.
