= Western Creek, Queensland =

Western Creek
- Suburb
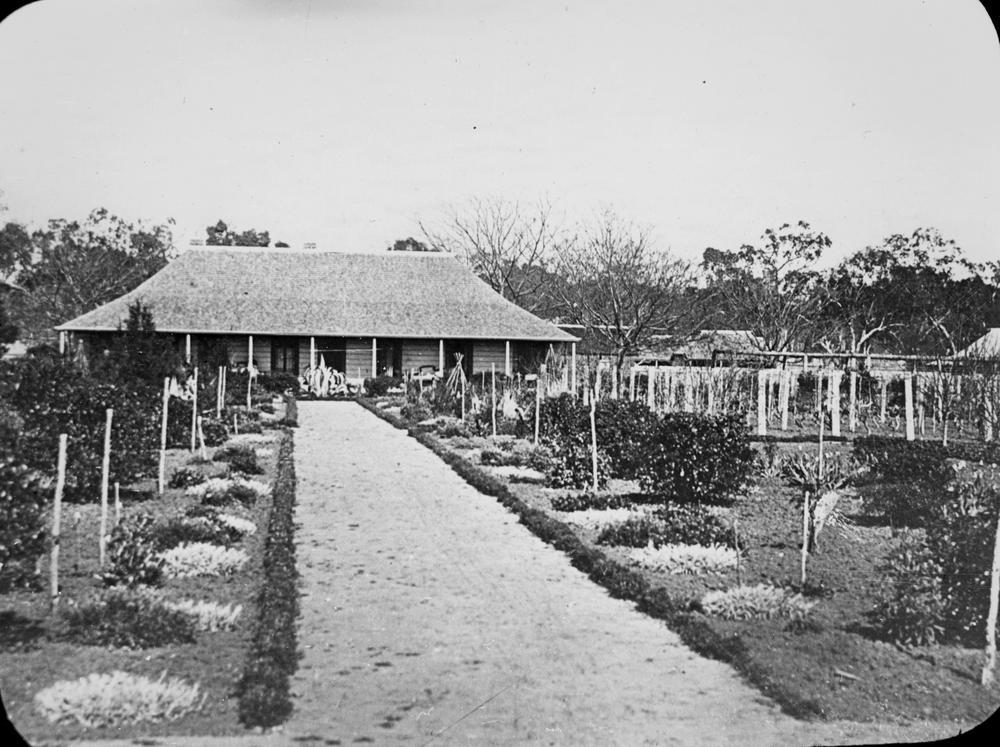
- Homestead, Western Creek Station, circa 1875

- Interactive map of Western Creek
- Coordinates: 27.85°S 150.95°E
- Country: Australia
- State: Queensland
- LGA: Toowoomba Region
- Location: 46.8 km (29.1 mi) W of Millmerran; 129 km (80 mi) SW of Toowoomba; 261 km (162 mi) WSW of Brisbane

Government
  - State electorate: Southern Downs
  - Federal division: Maranoa

Area
  - Total: 714.9 km^{2} (276.0 sq mi)

Population
  - Total: 0 (2021 census)
  - Density: 0.0000/km^{2} (0.0000/sq mi)
- Time zone: UTC+10:00 (AEST)
- Postcode: 4357
Suburbs around Western Creek
Cattle Creek	Dunmore	Kurrowah
Weir River	Western Creek	Turallin
Boondandilla; Bulli Creek	Wattle Ridge; The Pines; Condamine Farms	Captains Mountain

Western Creek is a rural locality in the Toowoomba Region, Queensland, Australia. In the 2021 census, Western Creek had "no people or a very low population".

== Geography ==
The creek of the same name rises in the east of the locality and flows west through the locality into neighbouring locality of Weir River where it becomes a tributary of the river of the same name.

Most of Western Creek is within the Western Creek State Forest with only a few small areas of farmland and undeveloped land in the northern, eastern and southern parts of the locality.

== History ==
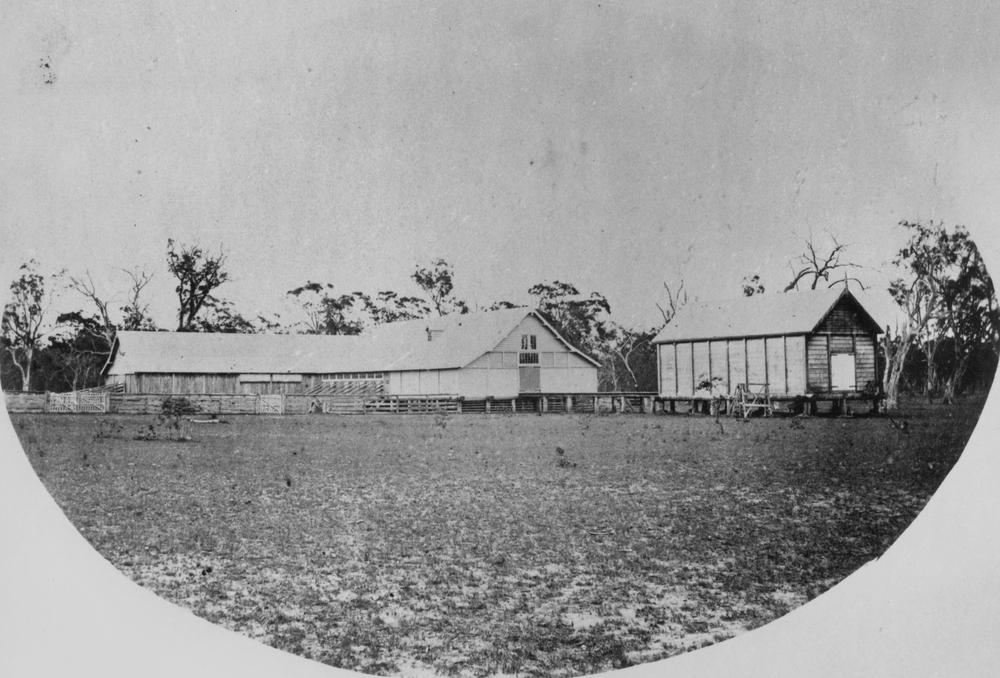
Woolshead at Western Creek Station, circa 1875

The locality takes its name from the parish, which in turn was named after an early pastoral run Western Creek belonging to James Laidley during the 1840s. In 1849 it was taken over by Captain Frances Durrell Vignoles in 1849, who held it for about thirty years, but problems with grass seed and his sheep ruined him financially. It was taken over in 1883 by The Scottish Australian Investment Company Limited and then by Dalmally Limited in association with W.A. Russell. Following Russell's death, it was taken over by Albert Edward Specht of Wellcamp, the son of pioneering family on the Darling Downs. When Specht died in 1941, the property was taken over by his two brothers William Dougall Specht and Archibald John Specht. After Archibald's death in 1944, William continued to run the property until his death in 1952. The property was then purchased by Thomas Barkla son of J.E.E Barkla who had purchased adjacent Dunmore station in 1916.

The property originally carried over 100,000 head of sheep in addition to cattle and horses, but resumptions of land over the years reduced its capacity.

== Demographics ==
In the 2016 census, Western Creek had a population of 15 people.

In the 2021 census, Western Creek had "no people or a very low population".

== Education ==
There are no schools in Western Creek. The nearest government primary schools are Cecil Plains State School in Cecil Plains to the north-east, Millmerran State School in Millmerran to the east, and Kindon State School in Kindon to the south-west. The nearest government secondary school is Millmerran State School (to Year 10). There are no schools nearby offering secondary schooling to Year 12; the alternatives are distance education or boarding school.
