= Theodor Martin Peter Ziesemer =

Theodor Martin Peter Ziesemer (26 May 1899 – 28 November 1961) was an Australian dairy farmer and wheat farmer. Ziesemer was born in Pittsworth, Queensland and died in Toowoomba, Queensland.

He was the son of August Friedrich Wilhelm Ziesemer and Wilhelmina (née Mundt) Ziesemer, and had a brother Friedrich Wilhelm Ernst Ziesemer.
