= Friedrich Wilhelm Ernst Ziesemer =

Australian farmer

Friedrich Wilhelm Ernst Ziesemer (8 August 1897 – 3 October 1972) was an Australian dairy farmer, grazier and wheat farmer. Ziesemer was born in Pittsworth, Queensland and died in Toowoomba, Queensland.

He was the son of August Friedrich Wilhelm Ziesemer and Wilhelmina (née Mundt) Ziesemer, and had a brother Theodor Martin Peter Ziesemer.
