= Dunmore, Queensland =

Dunmore
- Suburb
- Interactive map of Dunmore
- Coordinates: 27.6666°S 150.9666°E
- Country: Australia
- State: Queensland
- LGA: Toowoomba Region
- Location: 32.5 km (20.2 mi) SW of Cecil Plains; 50.2 km (31.2 mi) NW of Millmerran; 114 km (71 mi) W of Toowoomba CBD; 243 km (151 mi) W of Brisbane

Government
  - State electorate: Southern Downs
  - Federal division: Maranoa

Area
  - Total: 509.9 km^{2} (196.9 sq mi)

Population
  - Total: 39 (2021 census)
  - Density: 0.0765/km^{2} (0.1981/sq mi)
- Time zone: UTC+10:00 (AEST)
- Postcode: 4407
Suburbs around Dunmore
| Cattle Creek | Halliford | Cecil Plains |
| Cattle Creek | Dunmore | Kurrowah |
| Western Creek | Western Creek | Western Creek |

Dunmore is a rural locality in the Toowoomba Region, Queensland, Australia. In the 2021 census, Dunmore had a population of 39 people.

== Geography ==
About half of land area of the locality is protected within the Dunmore State Forest to the west, the Western Creek State Forest in the south-west and the Kumbarilla State Forest in the north-east.

Apart from the protected areas, the land use is a mixture of grazing on native vegetation and crop growing with feedlots in the centre of the locality.

== History ==
The locality takes its name from the parish name, which in turn was named after the pastoral run held by Robert Logan in the 1840s. The run might have been named in honour of Presbyterian minister John Dunmore Lang.

== Demographics ==
In the 2016 census, Dunmore had a population of 26 people.

In the 2021 census, Dunmore had a population of 39 people.

== Education ==
There are no schools in Dunmore. The nearest government schools are Cecil Plains State School in neighbouring Cecil Plains to the north-east and Millmerran State School in Millmerran to the south-east, both of which offer primary and secondary schooling to Year 10. There are no nearby schools offering secondary schooling to Year 12; the alternatives are distance education and boarding school.
