= Pittsworth, Queensland =

Pittsworth
- Town
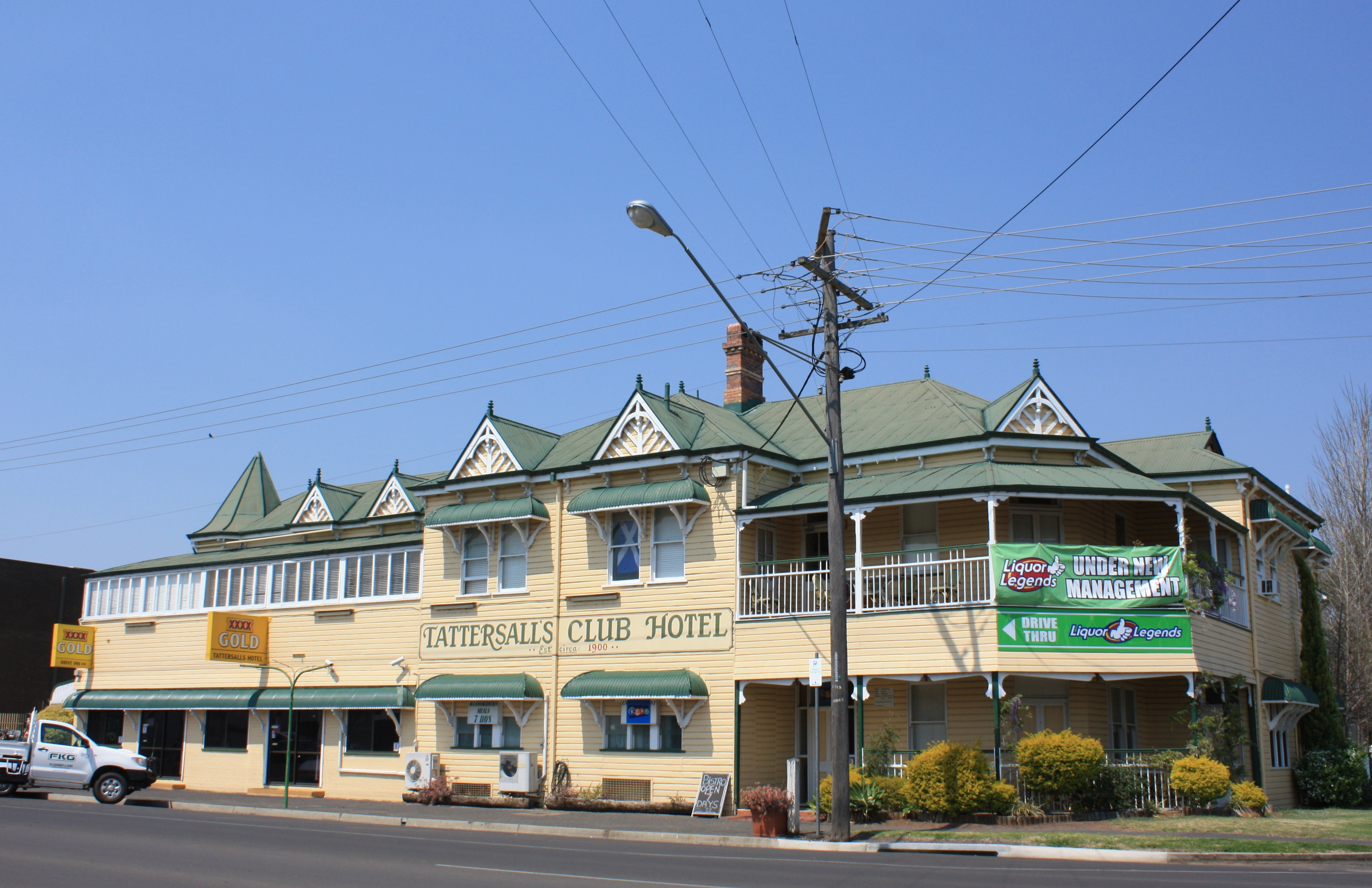
- Tattersalls Club Hotel, Pittsworth, 2011

- Interactive map of Pittsworth
- Coordinates: 27.7161°S 151.6333°E
- Country: Australia
- State: Queensland
- LGA: Toowoomba Region
- Location: 38.9 km (24.2 mi) SW of Toowoomba; 89.8 km (55.8 mi) NW of Warwick; 171 km (106 mi) WSW of Brisbane

Government
  - State electorate: Condamine
  - Federal division: Groom

Area
  - Total: 59.3 km^{2} (22.9 sq mi)
- Elevation: 519 m (1,703 ft)

Population
  - Total: 3,300 (2021 census)
  - Density: 55.6/km^{2} (144.1/sq mi)
- Time zone: UTC+10:00 (AEST)
- Postcode: 4356
- Mean max temp: 24.2 °C (75.6 °F)
- Mean min temp: 11.5 °C (52.7 °F)
- Annual rainfall: 700.6 mm (27.58 in)
Localities around Pittsworth
Springside	Stoneleigh	Linthorpe
Yarranlea	Pittsworth	Broxburn
Scrubby Mountain	North Branch	Felton

Pittsworth is a rural town and locality in the Toowoomba Region, Queensland, Australia. In the 2021 census, the locality of Pittsworth had a population of 3,300 people.

== Geography ==
Pittsworth township is 169 kilometres (105 mi) south-west of Brisbane via the Warrego Highway, 41 kilometres (25 mi) south-west of Toowoomba and is a service centre for the surrounding agricultural area.

It is situated on the basalt upland section of the Darling Downs of southern Queensland which is undulating in nature and hosts mixed farming and intensive animal industries. Nearby is an alluvial flood plain, mostly leading directly to the north branch of the Condamine River. This flood plain provides some of the best quality grains and cotton in Australia and utilises overland flood flows for irrigation purposes.

== Climate ==
Climate data for Pittsworth
Month	Jan	Feb	Mar	Apr	May	Jun	Jul	Aug	Sep	Oct	Nov	Dec	Year
Record high °C (°F)	38.3 (100.9)	40.0 (104.0)	38.0 (100.4)	34.5 (94.1)	29.4 (84.9)	25.3 (77.5)	27.0 (80.6)	30.8 (87.4)	31.0 (87.8)	36.6 (97.9)	39.4 (102.9)	40.6 (105.1)	40.6 (105.1)
Mean daily maximum °C (°F)	29.9 (85.8)	29.1 (84.4)	27.8 (82.0)	24.7 (76.5)	20.5 (68.9)	17.3 (63.1)	16.7 (62.1)	18.6 (65.5)	22.1 (71.8)	25.6 (78.1)	28.4 (83.1)	29.8 (85.6)	24.2 (75.6)
Mean daily minimum °C (°F)	17.0 (62.6)	16.9 (62.4)	15.4 (59.7)	12.0 (53.6)	8.4 (47.1)	6.1 (43.0)	5.0 (41.0)	5.9 (42.6)	8.7 (47.7)	11.9 (53.4)	14.4 (57.9)	16.1 (61.0)	11.5 (52.7)
Record low °C (°F)	11.1 (52.0)	10.8 (51.4)	8.3 (46.9)	5.0 (41.0)	−0.6 (30.9)	−0.6 (30.9)	−2.2 (28.0)	−1.1 (30.0)	−0.3 (31.5)	2.8 (37.0)	5.5 (41.9)	8.1 (46.6)	−2.2 (28.0)
Average rainfall mm (inches)	90.8 (3.57)	75.7 (2.98)	67.7 (2.67)	38.1 (1.50)	40.8 (1.61)	39.9 (1.57)	38.9 (1.53)	30.1 (1.19)	35.8 (1.41)	63.8 (2.51)	76.3 (3.00)	98.1 (3.86)	696 (27.4)
Average rainy days (≥ 0.2mm)	7.7	7.0	6.9	4.5	4.9	5.4	5.2	4.6	5.1	6.8	7.2	8.2	73.5
Source: Bureau of Meteorology

== History ==
The first known people to have lived on the land surrounding Pittsworth are the Giabal people.

Situated on the Darling Downs, Pittsworth owes its existence to that great explorer and botanist Allan Cunningham who in early June 1827 discovered and named the area around Warwick and to the north, the Darling Downs.

Early settlement was driven by the taking up of land for the Beauaraba pastoral station. The town grew up around a wayside hotel, named the Beauaraba, which attracted itinerant rural workers and local landholders.

In 1877, 43,000 acres (17,000 ha) were resumed from the Beauaraba pastoral run and offered for selection on 17 April 1877.

The Millmerran railway line reached the town in 1877 with the Pittsworth railway station serving the town, being called named in honour of Charles William Pitts, a pastoralist who established the Goombungee pastoral run in 1854.

Beauaraba State School opened on 5 May 1882. On 4 November 1889, it was renamed Pittsworth State School. At the 50th anniversary celebrations in 1932, "there was a large attendance, and 50 or more trees were planted. Mr. W. P. Adam, who for 14 years was head teacher of the school, but is now retired, called the roll of the school of 50 years ago, and the following-answered "present": Percy Cornford, William Carter. J. Muir, W. Muir, a Kirkup, and Mrs. J. Oarliach." From 3 February 1958 the school also offered secondary education, until a separate secondary school opened in 1967. The school celebrated its 100th anniversary in 1982 with the publication of a history of the school.

Beauaraba Post Office opened on 1 November 1882 (a receiving office had been open from 1880). It was renamed Pittsworth in 1886.

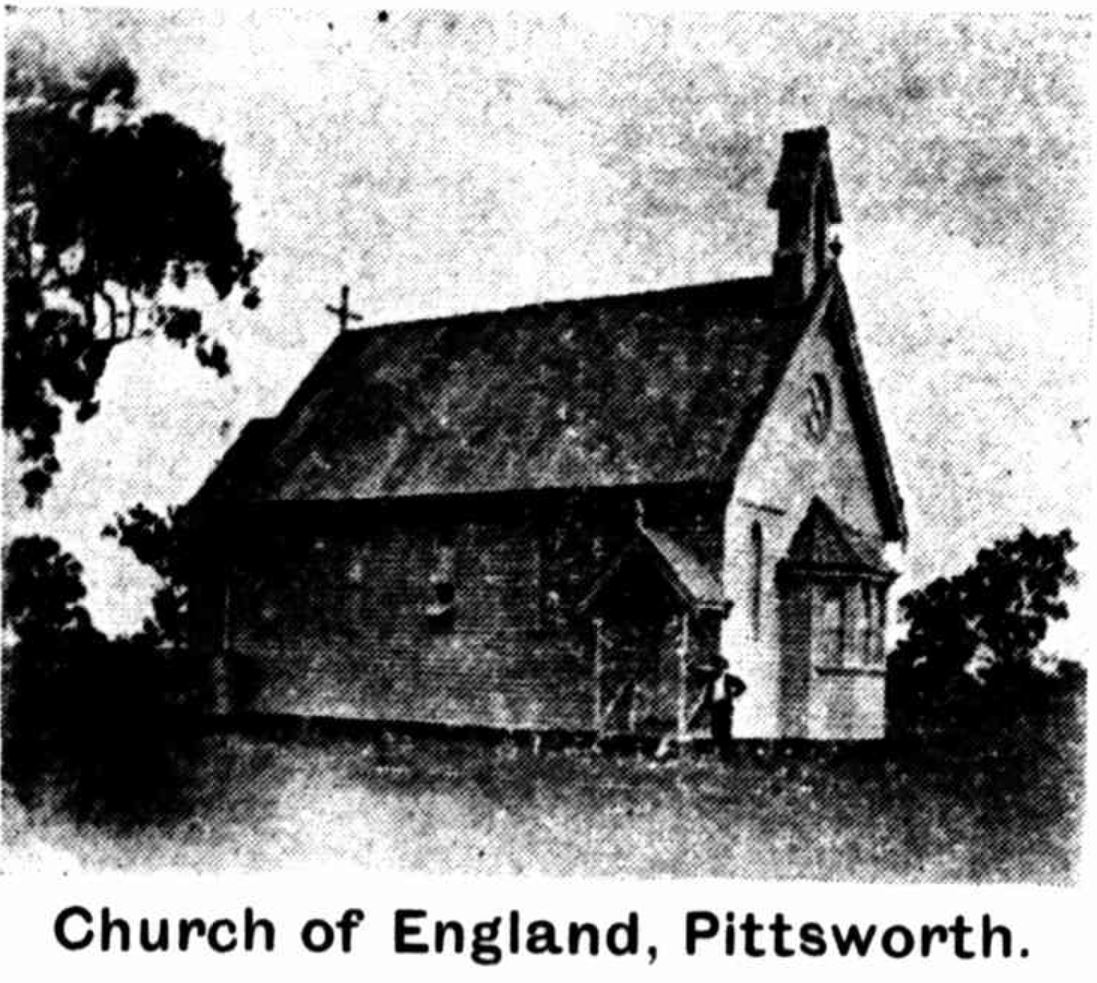
First St Andrew's Anglican Church, 1901

The first St Andrew's Anglican Church was designed by the prominent Toowoomba architect John Marks in 1888-89. It was at 18 Murray Street. The foundation stone of the second St Andrew's Anglican Church was laid on 3 November 1912, and the building was consecrated on 7 October 1913 by Archbishop St Clair Donaldson.

After a number of years of pastoral settlement, the town was established and slowly grew to offer services for the surrounding agricultural industries. The Co-operative Dairy Company opened in 1896. It was noted by the correspondent for the Darling Downs Gazette that "the milk brought by the suppliers is of a very high quality, comparing favourably with the highest tests in the colony. The cheese turned out of this factory, I may state, is of excellent quality, and is finding a ready market throughout many of the Northern towns."

In 1901, a Methodist Church and parsonage was built in Pittsworth at a cost of £783. The church officially opened on 5 May 1901.

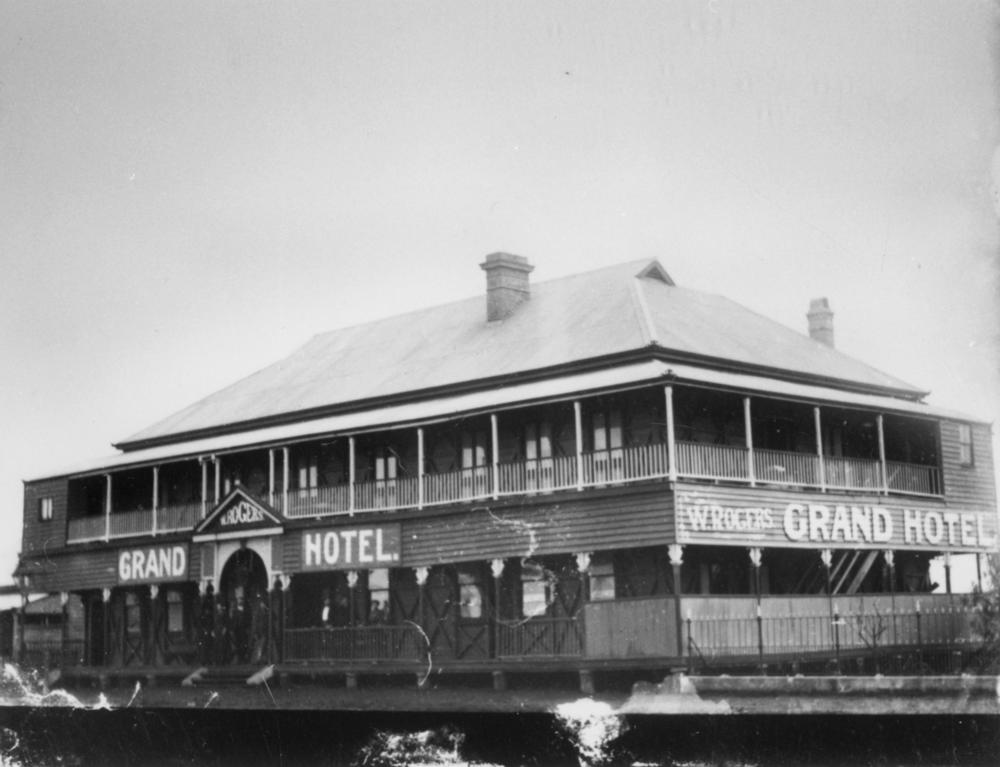
The Grand Hotel at Pittsworth, c. 1903

The first Pittsworth Show was held in March 1902, and opened by the Lieutenant-Governor, Sir Samuel Griffith, and attended by an estimated 2,500 people.

The foundation stone of St Stephen's Catholic church was laid in 1908. The church was opened 12 December 1909.

By 1914, Pittsworth had a number of dairy factories which were producing about 80 per cent of all the cheese being manufactured on the Darling Downs. In 1923, the Pittsworth Dairy Company made a single block of cheddar cheese weighing 3360 lb which was shipped to the Queensland exhibit at the Empire Exhibition at Wembley Park. The same company exceeded its ownefforts in 1925, exhibiting a single cheese that was 4000lb, becoming the World Record holder for the largest single block of cheese.

Pittsworth was declared a local authority on 24 April 1913, separating from Jondaryan. The first council meeting was held at the Lyceum Hall Pittsworth on 9 July 1913, where W.P. Copp was elected chairman. Mr W O'Hara appointed as acting council clerk, and at the first meeting there were discussions regarding acquiring a site for the new shire office and the appointment of a foreman of works, plus the rate for all three divisions. A new council office and hall was constructed in 1914 at a cost of £766. Pittsworth township remained the administrative centre of the Pittsworth Shire until 15 March 2008, when the Pittsworth Shire amalgamated with eight other shires as part of the Toowoomba Regional Council.

The town was originally known as Beauaraba, with the name was officially changed to be Pittsworth in 1915. However, the town name of Pittsworth was in common use prior to the official name change.

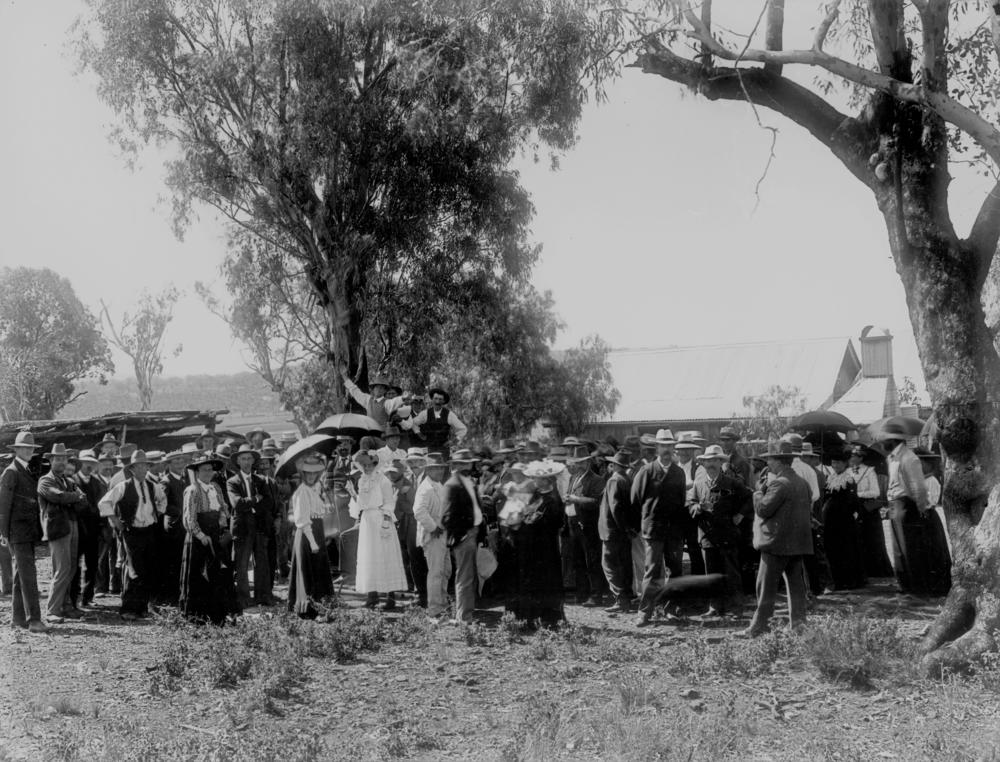
Crowd attending Pittsworth Races, ca. 1912

On Sunday 6 August 1916, Archbishop James Duhig officially opened and dedicated a convent for the Sisters of St Joseph of the Sacred Heart and a Catholic primary school that the Sisters would operate. Over 2,000 people attended the event. There were 40 initial enrolments, growing to 180 by the end of 1916. The school was known as St Joseph's Convent School until a new school was built in 1958 and named St Stephen's Catholic School. The Sisters operated the school until 1981 after which the school continued with lay teachers. The convent building at 26 Weale Street had been used for some years as a parish centre, and was listed by the Pittsworth Shire Council for its heritage values, but the church was unable to afford the upkeep of the building, and it was sold for relocation in December 2013, being taken to 1154 Yandina Coolum Road, Maroochy River and restored as a private residence. The school celebrated its centenary in August 2016 including the publication of a school history.

The Pittsworth Branch of the Queensland Country Women's Association opened in 1924. At the meeting held in the Masonic Hall to consider opening a branch in Pittsworth, the Darling Downs organiser, Mrs. Fairfax, explained that "the main object of members was to work for their sisters that were less fortunate than themselves, and spoke of the benefits of the reduced railway fares, the education of children out back, the homes at the seaside, and the bush nurses, and various other branches of work that is handled by the Association." The first President was Mrs. H.C. Hodgson. The Beuaraba Branch still meets in Pittsworth at the Uniting Church Hall, Briggs Street.

In May 1930, a Soldiers Memorial School of Arts was officially opened.

Pittsworth State High School opened on 23 January 1967, replacing the secondary schooling being provided at Pittsworth State School since 1958.

The Pittsworth Library opened in 2009.

On 7 January 2016, around 2:30 am, a fire broke out at Pittsworth's iconic Tattersalls Club Hotel, which was built about 1900. One person died in the fire. The hotel was engulfed by flames by the time fire crews arrived, and was unable to be saved.

== Demographics ==
In the 2016 census, the locality of Pittsworth had a population of 3,294 people.

In the 2021 census, the locality of Pittsworth had a population of 3,300 people.

== Heritage listings ==
Pittsworth has a number of heritage-listed sites, including:

- former Pittsworth Shire Council Chambers and Shire Hall, Short Street

== Education ==
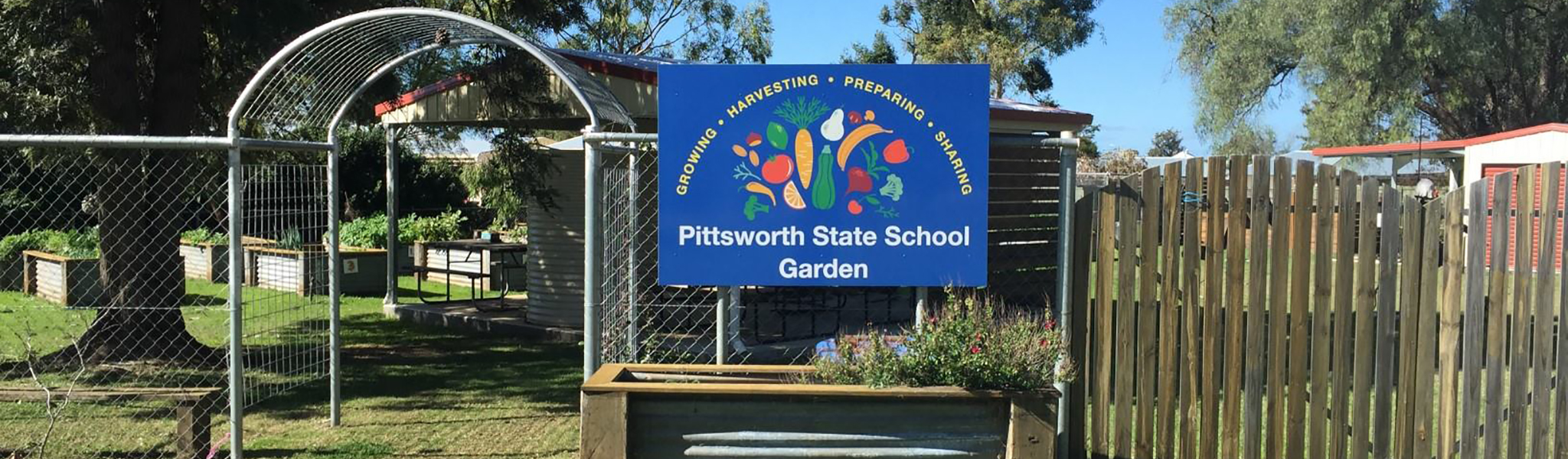
Pittsworth State School, 2025

Pittsworth State School is a government primary (Early Childhood to Year 6) school for boys and girls at 42 Hume Street (27.7183°S 151.6340°E). In 2015, the school had an enrolment of 322 students with 24 teachers (20 full-time equivalent) and 16 non-teaching staff (10 full-time equivalent). In 2016. there were 315 students from Prep to year 6 enrolled. In 2018, the school had an enrolment of 300 students with 27 teachers (21 full-time equivalent) and 16 non-teaching staff (11 full-time equivalent).

St Stephen's School is a Catholic primary (Prep–6) school for boys and girls at 22 Murray Street (27.7189°S 151.6366°E). In 2014, it had an enrolment of 126 students in P–7 classes with 9 teachers (8.4 full-time equivalent) and 8 non-teaching staff (3.3 full-time equivalent). In 2018, the school had an enrolment of 137 students with 13 teachers (10 full-time equivalent) and 10 non-teaching staff (4 full-time equivalent).

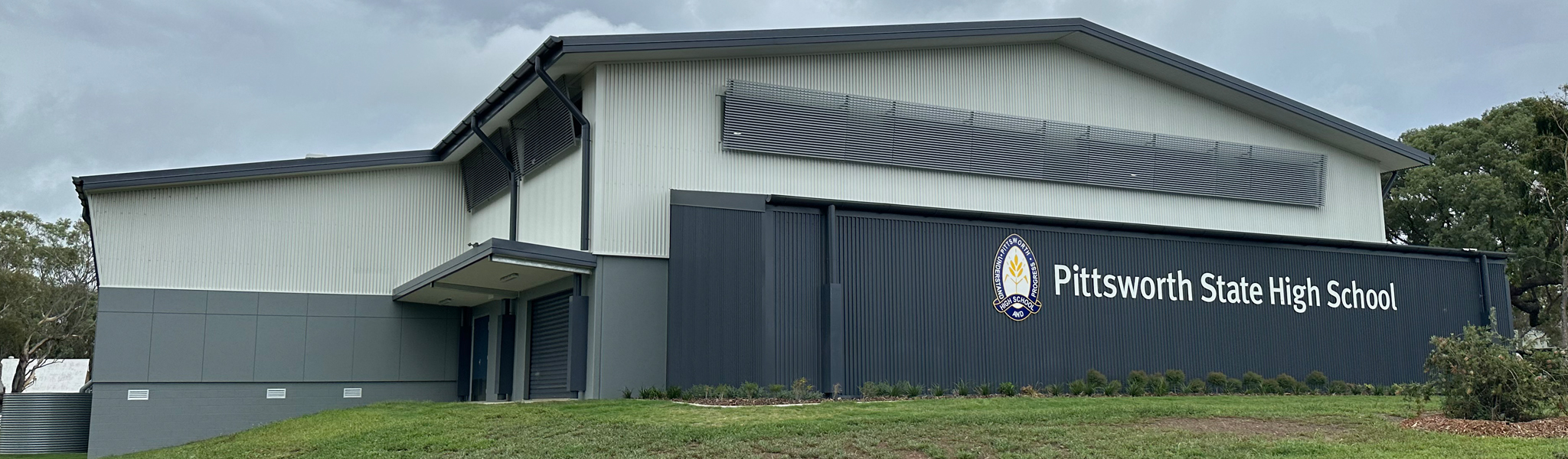
Pittsworth State High School, 2025

Pittsworth State High School is a government secondary (7–12) school for boys and girls at Factory Street (27.7090°S 151.6455°E). In 2015, it had an enrolment of 469 students with 48 teachers (45 full-time equivalent) and 27 non-teaching staff (19 full-time equivalent). In 2018, the school had an enrolment of 439 students with 50 teachers (44 full-time equivalent) and 32 non-teaching staff (19 full-time equivalent). It includes a special education program for primary and secondary students.

== Amenities ==
The Pittsworth Library is operated by the Toowoomba Regional Council. The library is located on Yandilla Street and is open Monday to Saturday.

The Pittsworth Civic Pool is at 40A Yandilla Street (27.7158°S 151.6360°E). It operates seasonally. It is owned by the Toowoomba Regional Council.

The Beauaraba branch of the Queensland Country Women's Association meets at the Uniting Church Hall in Briggs Street; Beauaraba is the name of the local parish.

St Stephens Catholic Church is a large red-brick Catholic church in Pittsworth, and the parish incorporates the communities of Pittsworth, Southbrook and Mt. Tyson.

St. Andrew's Anglican Church is on the corner of Murray and Hume Streets.

== Attractions ==
An important attraction in the town is the Pittsworth & District Historical Society Folk Museum. This interesting and well-presented complex is on the outskirts of town. The Pittsworth Museum combines a fine collection of old buildings – the former Pittsworth Post Office, the telephone exchange, the post masters residence, the former one teacher school, a fully furnished cottage (circa 1900) and a blacksmith shop – with some historical memorabilia. Items include a chantilly lace wrap which once belonged to Florence Nightingale, a love letter written by Governor Bligh's mother, and an outdoor display of carts and farm equipment. The museum is also home to a display of memorabilia boasting the feats of Arthur Postle, known as the "Crimson Flash", Australia and the world's one time fastest athlete. In 1906, Postle was proclaimed 'the champion of the world' when he won the 220 yards World Championship Cup.

== Events ==
The annual Pittsworth Sprints is two days of car sprints against the clock on a set course around the Pittsworth Industrial Estate.

The Pittsworth Show is held every year in March and has been an important regional event for more than 100 years.

Pittsworth parkrun is a weekly, free, timed, 5 kilometre run held at 7am every Saturday at the Pittsworth show grounds on Railway Street.

== Media ==
Pittsworth FM 87.6 was launched in 2008 to serve the local Pittsworth area. It is a narrowcast station with an easy listening and country music format. It was previously known as Double 8FM in 2007.

The Pittsworth Sentinel is Pittsworth's weekly newspaper.

== Notable people ==
Notable people from or who have lived in Pittsworth include:

- Sir Alan Roy Fletcher, chairman of Pittsworth Shire Council and Member of the Queensland Legislative Assembly for Cunningham.
- Mark Hohn, Australian, Queensland and Brisbane Broncos rugby league player
- Arthur Postle, internationally renowned Australian sprinter
- Friedrich Wilhelm Ernst Ziesemer, wheat farming pioneer
- Theodor Martin Peter Ziesemer, wheat farming pioneer
- Gavin Whittaker, NRL player, Canterbury Bankston Bulldogs & Gold Coast

== Sources ==
- Queensland Holidays – Pittsworth
- Australian Bureau Of Meteorology Climate statistics for Australian locations – Pittsworth.
