= Wildash =

- Suburb
- Interactive map of Wildash
- Coordinates: 28.3338°S 152.0661°E
- Country: Australia
- State: Queensland
- LGA: Southern Downs Region
- Location: 14.2 km (8.8 mi) S of Warwick; 96.7 km (60.1 mi) S of Toowoomba; 170 km (110 mi) SW of Brisbane

Government
  - State electorate: Southern Downs
  - Federal division: Maranoa

Area
  - Total: 85.7 km^{2} (33.1 sq mi)

Population
  - Total: 75 (2021 census)
  - Density: 0.875/km^{2} (2.267/sq mi)
- Time zone: UTC+10:00 (AEST)
- Postcode: 4370
Suburbs around Wildash
| Morgan Park | Morgan Park | Canningvale |
| Silverwood | Wildash | Murrays Bridge |
| Silverwood | Cherry Gully | Elbow Valley |

Wildash is a rural locality in the Southern Downs Region, Queensland, Australia. In the 2021 census, Wildash had a population of 75 people.

== History ==
The locality's name was derived from the parish name, which in turn was named after pastoralist Frederick John Cobb Wildash of Canning Downs.

Lord John Swamp Provisional School opened in 1878 and closed circa 1882. On 14 October 1883, it reopened as Lord John Swamp State School. In 1924, it was renamed Wildash State School. It closed in 1938. It was on the north-west corner of Wildash School Road and Shepherd Lane (28.31021°S 152.07446°E).

== Demographics ==
In the 2016 census, Wildash had a population of 66 people.

In the 2021 census, Wildash had a population of 75 people.

== Education ==
There are no schools in Wildash. The nearest government primary schools are Murray's Bridge State School in neighbouring Murrays Bridge to the east, Warwick East State School in Warwick to the north, and Dalveen State School in Dalveen to the south-west. The nearest government secondary school is Warwick State High School in Warwick..
