= The Hermitage, Queensland =

The Hermitage
- Suburb
- Interactive map of The Hermitage
- Coordinates: 28.2069°S 152.1080°E
- Country: Australia
- State: Queensland
- LGA: Southern Downs Region
- Location: 8.0 km (5.0 mi) E of Warwick; 88 km (55 mi) S of Toowoomba; 157 km (98 mi) SW of Brisbane

Government
  - State electorate: Southern Downs
  - Federal division: Maranoa

Area
  - Total: 14.7 km^{2} (5.7 sq mi)

Population
  - Total: 55 (2021 census)
  - Density: 3.74/km^{2} (9.69/sq mi)
- Time zone: UTC+10:00 (AEST)
- Postcode: 4370
Suburbs around The Hermitage
Sladevale	Sladevale	Swan Creek
Mount Tabor	The Hermitage	Swan Creek
Junabee	Junabee	Junabee

The Hermitage is a rural locality in the Southern Downs Region, Queensland, Australia. In the 2021 census, The Hermitage had a population of 55 people. There is a large agricultural research facility in the locality.

== Geography ==
The terrain ranges from 460 to 640 metres (1,510 to 2,100 ft) above sea level with the lower land in the centre and south of the locality and the higher terrain in the north of the location.

The land use is crop growing with some grazing on native vegetation.

== Climate ==
The lowest temperature in Queensland was -10.6 °C (12.9 °F) registered on 12 July 1965 in The Hermitage.

Climate data for Hermitage (1965-1998), 28.21°S, 152.10° E, 475m AMSL
Month	Jan	Feb	Mar	Apr	May	Jun	Jul	Aug	Sep	Oct	Nov	Dec	Year
Record high °C (°F)	41.7 (107.1)	39.0 (102.2)	35.5 (95.9)	33.9 (93.0)	28.2 (82.8)	24.6 (76.3)	25.2 (77.4)	31.3 (88.3)	32.5 (90.5)	36.4 (97.5)	40.1 (104.2)	40.6 (105.1)	41.7 (107.1)
Mean daily maximum °C (°F)	29.6 (85.3)	28.6 (83.5)	27.2 (81.0)	24.6 (76.3)	20.7 (69.3)	17.8 (64.0)	17.1 (62.8)	18.7 (65.7)	22.0 (71.6)	25.0 (77.0)	27.4 (81.3)	29.1 (84.4)	24.0 (75.2)
Mean daily minimum °C (°F)	16.8 (62.2)	16.5 (61.7)	14.6 (58.3)	10.9 (51.6)	7.7 (45.9)	4.2 (39.6)	2.4 (36.3)	3.4 (38.1)	6.2 (43.2)	10.1 (50.2)	13.0 (55.4)	15.6 (60.1)	10.1 (50.2)
Record low °C (°F)	8.4 (47.1)	6.8 (44.2)	1.1 (34.0)	−1.2 (29.8)	−5.3 (22.5)	−7.9 (17.8)	−10.6 (12.9)	−7.0 (19.4)	−5.3 (22.5)	−3.6 (25.5)	1.3 (34.3)	4.8 (40.6)	−10.6 (12.9)
Average precipitation mm (inches)	81.6 (3.21)	74.7 (2.94)	60.5 (2.38)	35.0 (1.38)	42.4 (1.67)	36.7 (1.44)	40.2 (1.58)	29.2 (1.15)	36.7 (1.44)	65.6 (2.58)	71.5 (2.81)	94.5 (3.72)	668.1 (26.30)
Average precipitation days	8.3	7.4	6.8	5.0	5.8	5.8	5.6	4.9	5.0	7.2	7.3	8.7	77.8
Mean monthly sunshine hours	251.1	214.7	235.6	231.0	198.4	195.0	217.0	244.9	252.0	257.3	255.0	257.3	2,809.3
Source: Bureau of Meteorology

== History ==
The Hermitage Research Facility was established in March 1897 and was known as the State Farm and/or the Experimental Farm, making it one of the oldest research centres in Queensland. The original land parcel included the homestead of The Hermitage farm. Its original purpose was to provide advice to farmers taking up land in the area through the Queensland Government's closer settlement programs. During the Great Depression, the land was leased for commercial income, but in 1946 resumed undertaking government experiments with wheat breeding. On Thursday 20 March 1997, a cairn with a time capsule was unveiled to celebrate the centenary of the research facility.

The locality was officially named and bounded on 14 September 2001. It takes its name from an early pastoral property called The Hermitage.

== Demographics ==
In the 2016 census, The Hermitage had a population of 54 people.

In the 2021 census, The Hermitage had a population of 55 people.

== Education ==
There are no schools in The Hermitage. The nearest government primary schools are Warwick East State School in Warwick to the west and Yangan State School in Yangan to the east. The nearest government secondary school is Warwick State High School, also in Warwick. There are also a number of non-government schools in Warwick.

== Amenities ==
The Hermitage-Yangan branch of the Queensland Country Women's Association has its rooms at 589 Warwick Yangan Road.

== Facilities ==
The Queensland Government operates the Hermitage Research Facility at 604 Warwick Yangan Road (28.2059°S 152.1014°E). It occupies 228 hectares (560 acres) with a variety of soil types. Research areas include plant breeding, drought tolerance, and disease screening. The crops researched include barley, sorghum, chickpeas and mungbeans.
