= Wiyarra, Queensland =

Wiyarra
- Suburb
- Interactive map of Wiyarra
- Coordinates: 28.2755°S 152.2133°E
- Country: Australia
- State: Queensland
- LGA: Southern Downs Region
- Location: 13.5 km (8.4 mi) NW of Killarney; 23.4 km (14.5 mi) ESE of Warwick; 105 km (65 mi) S of Toowoomba; 173 km (107 mi) SW of Brisbane

Government
  - State electorate: Southern Downs
  - Federal division: Maranoa

Area
  - Total: 13.9 km^{2} (5.4 sq mi)

Population
  - Total: 20 (2021 census)
  - Density: 1.4/km^{2} (3.7/sq mi)
- Time zone: UTC+10:00 (AEST)
- Postcode: 4370
Suburbs around Wiyarra
Junabee	Junabee	Danderoo
Junabee	Wiyarra	Tannymorel
Loch Lomond	Loch Lomond	Tannymorel

Wiyarra is a rural locality in the Southern Downs Region, Queensland, Australia. In the 2021 census, Wiyarra had a population of 20 people.

== Geography ==
Wiyarra is on the Darling Downs. The terrain varies from 480 to 510 metres (1,570 to 1,670 ft) above sea level. The land use is predominantly crop growing with some grazing on native vegetation.

== History ==
The locality takes its name from a former railway station, an Aboriginal word for a local lagoon with black swans.

The Killarney railway line was a branch railway of the Southern railway line, connecting Warwick to Killarney via Wiyarra . It operated from 1884 to 1964. Wiyarra railway station was at 28.26626°S 152.22227°E, now within the present-day locality of Danderoo to the north-east.

== Demographics ==
In the 2016 census, Wiyarra had a population of 19 people.

In the 2021 census, Wiyarra had a population of 20 people.

== Education ==
There are no schools in Wiyarra. The nearest government primary schools are Yangan State School in Yangan to the north, Killarney State School in Killarney to the south-east, and Murray's Bridge State School in Murrays Bridge to the south-west. The nearest government secondary schools are Killarney State School (to Year 10) in Killarney and Warwick State High School (to Year 12) in Warwick to the north-west. There are also non-government schools in Warwick.
