= Tannymorel, Queensland =

Tannymorel
- Town
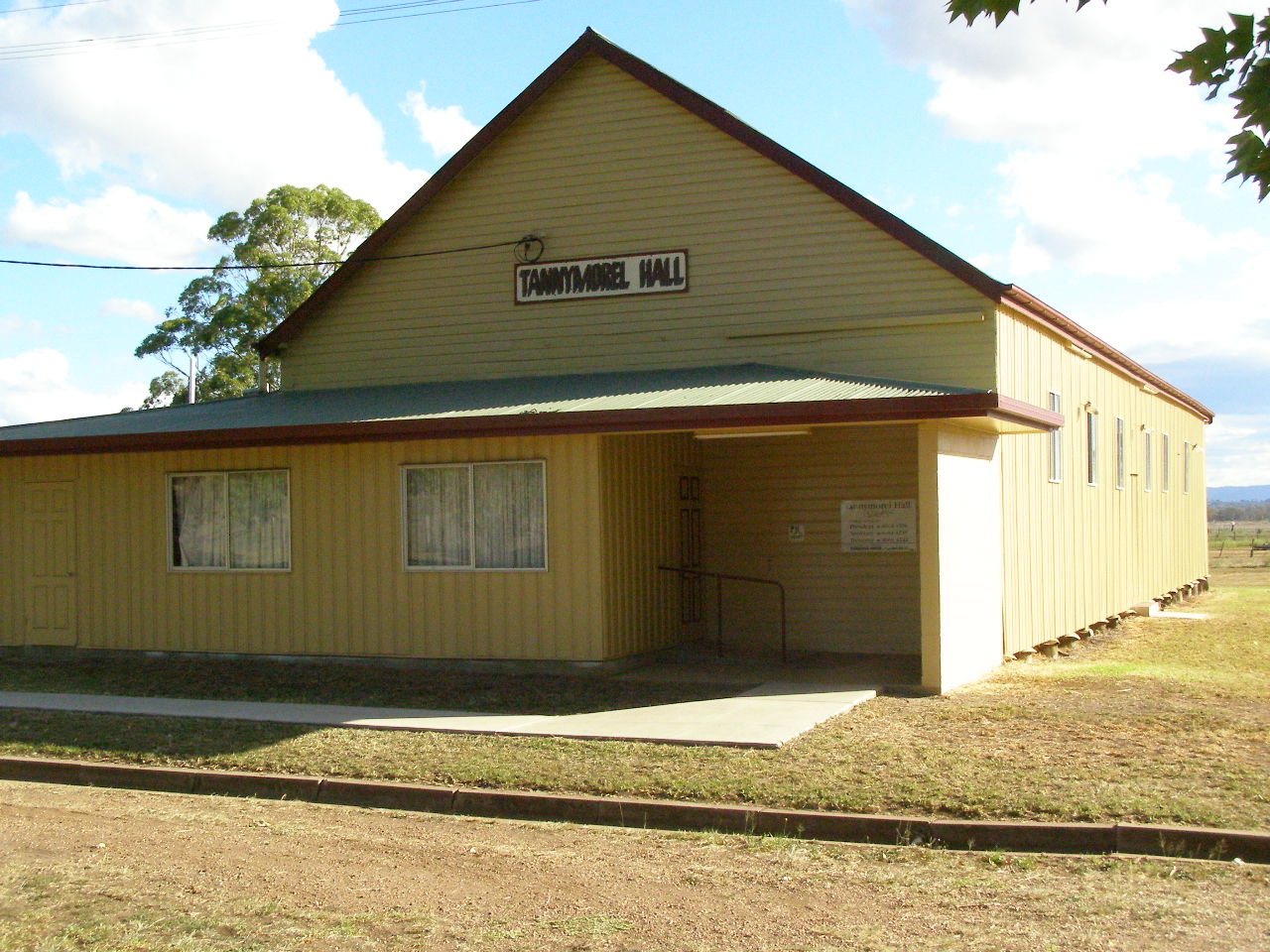
- Tannymorel Hall, 2007

- Interactive map of Tannymorel
- Coordinates: 28.2911°S 152.2455°E
- Country: Australia
- State: Queensland
- LGA: Southern Downs Region
- Location: 26.6 km (16.5 mi) ESE of Warwick; 109 km (68 mi) SSE of Toowoomba; 172 km (107 mi) SW of Brisbane

Government
  - State electorate: Southern Downs
  - Federal division: Maranoa

Area
  - Total: 32.5 km^{2} (12.5 sq mi)

Population
  - Total: 148 (2021 census)
  - Density: 4.554/km^{2} (11.79/sq mi)
- Time zone: UTC+10:00 (AEST)
- Postcode: 4372
Localities around Tannymorel
Danderoo	Emu Vale	Mount Colliery
Wiyarra	Tannymorel	Mount Colliery
Loch Lomond	Loch Lomond	Killarney

Tannymorel is a rural town and locality in the Southern Downs Region, Queensland, Australia. In the 2021 census, the locality of Tannymorel had a population of 148 people.

== History ==
The name Tannymorel comes from a village in Ireland and means a bend in the creek. It was named by Patrick Leslie and Ernest Dalrymple, both of whom were from Scotland.

Farm Creek Provisional School opened in May 1877 with teacher Mrs Fanny Spencely. On 18 January 1892, it became Farm Creek State School. In 1910, it was renamed Tannymorel State School. In 1914–1915, a new school building was erected with the old building being relocated to Mount Colliery to establish Mount Colliery State School. Tannymorel State School closed on 20 July 2017. The school was at 2 Oak Street (28.2950°S 152.2488°E). The school's website was archived.

The Killarney railway line from Warwick to Killarney reached Tannymorel on 24 August 1885 with town being served by the Tannymorel railway station (28.2907°S 152.2474°E). Grayson railway station was to the south-east of the town on Grayson Siding Road (28.3042°S 152.2570°E). The Mount Colliery Tramway, a private 5 kilometres (3.1 mi)-long horse tramway, opened in 1908. The tramway joined the line at Tannymorel to transport coal from a nearby mine to the railway. The Killarney line, together with the colliery tramway, closed on 1 May 1964.

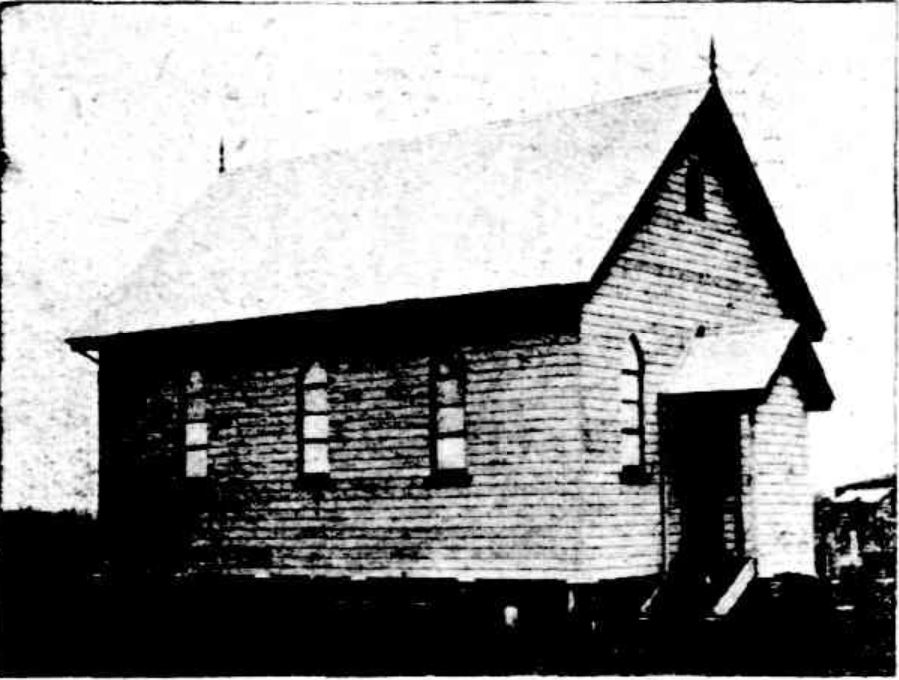
Methodist Church, 1909

A Methodist church was officially opened on Sunday 12 October 1902 by the Reverend Edward Youngman, the Superintendent of the Warwick circuit. In 1919 the church building was relocated to Amiens. In 1945, it was relocated to Severnlea, where it is now operates as the Severnlea Uniting Church.

A Presbyterian church was officially opened on Wednesday 22 June 1904 by the Reverend R.J. Sinclair.

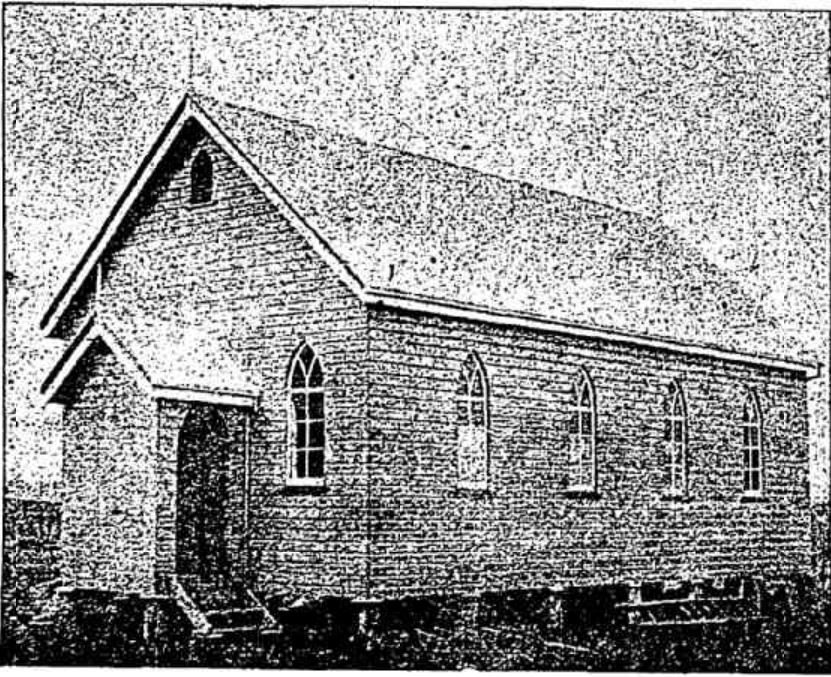
Church of Christ, 1910

A Church of Christ church was erected circa July 1910. Due to declining congregation numbers, the church closed and was relocated in 1950 to Myall Street in Dalby to establish a new church there.

St Aidan's Anglican Church was dedicated on Sunday 28 February 1915 by Archbishop St Clair Donaldson. The last normal service held in the church was at Christmas 2010. Its closure in 2012 was approved by Archbishop Phillip Aspinall and Bishop Rob Nolan conducted the deconsecration service on 26 May 2012. The church building at 11 Oak Street (28.2942°S 152.2479°E) was sold into private ownership in June 2013 for $110,000.

On Sunday 25 April 1915, Archbishop James Duhig laid the foundation stone for a Catholic church in Tannymorel with over 2,000 people attending. On Sunday 10 October 1915 Duhig blessed and dedicated St Michael's Catholic Church. The architects were Dornbusch & Connolly of Warwick and the contractor was Ludwig August Tessman also of Warwick. The building was 60 by 30 feet (18.3 by 9.1 m) with a sacristry 14 by 14 feet (4.3 by 4.3 m) and a porch 14 by 8 feet (4.3 by 2.4 m) with the total cost of buildings and furnishings being £1250.

In December 1915, a cyclone damaged both the Anglican and Catholic churches.

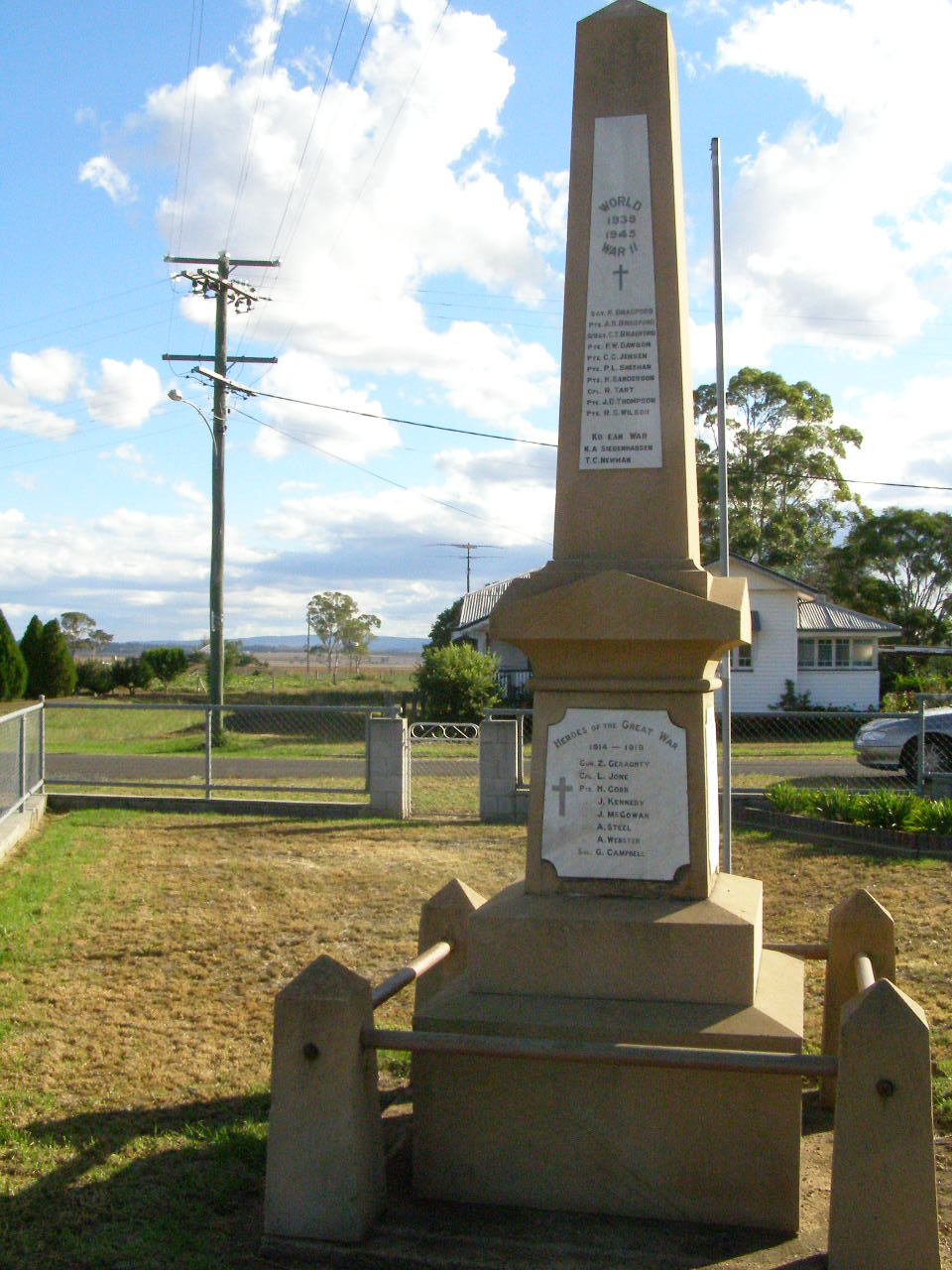
Tannymorel War Memorial, showing the World War II Honour Roll (upper) and World War I deaths (lower), 2007

On Tuesday 7 February 1922, the Queensland Governor Matthew Nathan officially unveiled the Tannymorel War Memorial. The ceremony was to have occurred on 31 December 1921 but was postponed due to wet weather. The memorial is made of Helidon sandstone and is 4 feet (1.2 m) square at the base and topped with an obelisk rising to 15 feet (4.6 m) above the ground. There are four marble panels on which the names of local servicement who died in World War I are inscribed on one panel while the other three panels record the names of those who served but survived, a total of 60 men. The memorial cost £104 and was constructed by William James Booth, a stonemason at Warwick.

On Sunday 16 November 1947, the Chairman of the Glengallan Shire Council, J. H. Hansen, officially unveiled an addition to the war memorial in the form of an Honour Roll listing 10 men from the district who served in World War II.

The Methodist church in Mount Colliery was sold and relocated to 15 Oak Street, Tannymorel (28.2938°S 152.2479°E), where it is used as a private residence.

== Demographics ==
In the 2011 census, the locality of Tannymorel had a population of 199 people.

In the 2016 census, the locality of Tannymorel had a population of 161 people.

In the 2021 census, the locality of Tannymorel had a population of 148 people.

== Education ==
There are no schools in Tannymorel. The nearest government primary schools are Killarney State School in neighbouring Killarney to the south-east, Murray's Bridge State School at Murrays Bridge to the west, and Yangan State School in Yangan to the north-west. The nearest government secondary schools are Killarney State School (to Year 10) in Killarney and Warwick State High School (to Year 12) in Warwick to the west.

== Notable people ==
- Colin Murray Turbayne – Professor of Philosophy and researcher on George Berkeley

== See also ==
- List of tramways in Queensland
