= Elbow Valley, Queensland =

Elbow Valley
- Suburb
- Interactive map of Elbow Valley
- Coordinates: 28.4091°S 152.1669°E
- Country: Australia
- State: Queensland
- LGA: Southern Downs Region
- Location: 27.9 km (17.3 mi) SE of Warwick; 48.4 km (30.1 mi) NE of Stanthorpe; 111 km (69 mi) S of Toowoomba; 183 km (114 mi) SW of Brisbane

Government
  - State electorate: Southern Downs
  - Federal division: Maranoa

Area
  - Total: 160.0 km^{2} (61.8 sq mi)

Population
  - Total: 127 (2021 census)
  - Density: 0.794/km^{2} (2.056/sq mi)
- Time zone: UTC+10:00 (AEST)
- Postcode: 4370
Suburbs around Elbow Valley
Wildash	Murrays Bridge	Loch Lomond; Killarney
Cherry Gully	Elbow Valley	Legume (NSW); Lower Acacia Creek (NSW)
Dalveen	Maryland (NSW)	Cullendore (NSW)

Elbow Valley is a rural locality in the Southern Downs Region, Queensland, Australia. It is on the border of New South Wales. In the 2021 census, Elbow Valley had a population of 127 people.

== History ==
The locality presumably takes its name from the Elbow River, which was named by botanist and explorer Allan Cunningham in his field notes on 6 June 1827.

Elbow Valley Provisional School opened on 17 July 1882 at Kirbys Crossing, later relocating to Cullendore Road, and then in 1905 relocating to its permanent site at 105 O'Deas Road (28.3876°S 152.1287°E). On 1 January 1909, it became Elbow Valley State School. It closed in 1946. In 1952, the school building was relocated to the St George area.

The Sacred Heart Catholic Church was officially opened on 10 June 1906 by the Reverend M. M. Potter. It was at 27 Church Lane (approx 28.3932°S 152.1277°E). It closed in 1982 and is now used as a house. It is listed on the Southern Downs Local Heritage Register.

Westmore State School opened in 1916 and closed in 1923. This school described as 7 miles (11 km) from Killarney was presumably in the vicinity of Westmore Road (28.3777°S 152.1977°E) and the Westmoor pastoral property, and may have been associated with the Westmore Cheese factory which opened in January 1914 and was 1/4 mile (400 m) from the school. It was a "tent school" and officially opened on 1 July 1916 by Francis Grayson, Member of the Queensland Legislative Assembly for Cunningham, with food provided by the cheese factory. In June 1927, the Queensland Government called for tenders to remove the school building.

== Demographics ==
In the 2016 census, Elbow Valley had a population of 95 people.

In the 2021 census, Elbow Valley had a population of 127 people.

== Education ==
There are no schools in Elbow Valley. The nearest government primary schools are Murray's Bridge State School in neighbouring Murrays Bridge to the north, Killarney State School in neighbouring Killarney to the north-east, and Dalveen State School in neighbouring Dalveen to the south-west. The nearest government secondary schools are Killarney State School (to Year 10), Warwick State High School (to Year 12) in Warwick to the north, and Stanthorpe State High School (to Year 12) in Stanthorpe to the south-west.
