= Morgan Park, Queensland =

Morgan Park
- Suburb
- Interactive map of Morgan Park
- Coordinates: 28.2580°S 152.0427°E
- Country: Australia
- State: Queensland
- LGA: Southern Downs Region
- Location: 4.5 km (2.8 mi) S of Warwick; 87 km (54 mi) S of Toowoomba; 161 km (100 mi) SW of Brisbane

Government
  - State electorate: Southern Downs
  - Federal division: Maranoa

Area
  - Total: 13.7 km^{2} (5.3 sq mi)

Population
  - Total: 98 (2021 census)
  - Density: 7.15/km^{2} (18.53/sq mi)
- Time zone: UTC+10:00 (AEST)
- Postcode: 4370
Suburbs around Morgan Park
Rosenthal Heights	Warwick	Canningvale
Rosenthal Heights	Morgan Park	Canningvale
Silverwood	Wildash	Wildash

Morgan Park is a rural locality in the Southern Downs Region, Queensland, Australia. In the 2021 census, Morgan Park had a population of 98 people.

== Geography ==
The locality is immediately south of the town of Warwick. It is bounded to the north by Bracker Road and Warwick - Killarney Road, to the north-east by Warwick - Killarney Road, to the east by Bentley Road, to the south-east by Pierce Road, to the south partially by Morgan Park Road, and to the south-west, west, and north-west by the South Western railway line.

The Morgan Park Conservation Park is in the south of the locality. It protectes an ecosystem of Eucalyptus moluccana and Eucalyptus microcarpa open forest and two migratory bird species, the rainbow bee-eater (Merops ornatus) and the rufous fantail (Rhipidura rufifrons).

The centre and west of the locality is occupied by the identically named Morgan Park, a reserve for sports and recreation (28.2604°S 152.0350°E).

The north of the locality includes a waste disposal landfill and an industrial area. The remainder of the locality is predominantly used for grazing on native vegetation.

== History ==
The locality takes its name from the now-abandoned Morgan Park railway station (28.26687°S 152.01497°E) on the South Western railway line, which was named after James Morgan, a politician and newspaper owner.

== Demographics ==
In the 2016 census, Morgan Park had a population of 86 people.

In the 2021 census, Morgan Park had a population of 98 people.

== Education ==
There are no schools in Morgan Park. The nearest government primary schools are Warwick East State School and Warwick West State School, both in neighbouring Warwick to the north, and Murray's Bridge State School in Murrays Bridge to the south-east. The nearest government secondary school is Warwick State High School, also in Warwick.

== Amenities ==
The park Morgan Park off Old Stanthorpe Road is operated by the Southern Downs Regional Council and has a number of recreational facilities, including:

- Morgan Park Raceway for motorsports, including circuit racing, drag racing and motocross
- Warwick Polocrosse Club with seven playing fields and two practice fields with seating for up to 2,500 spectators, used for polocrosse and horse trials
- Barclay Field, a model aircraft flying area with an operating height of 1,500 feet (460 m) and no noise restrictions

Morgan Park Conservation Park is used for birdwatching with many species of birds to be seen.

== Facilities ==
Warwick Waste Facility is a landfill on Old Stanthorpe Road. It is operated by the Southern Downs Regional Council.
