= Junabee =

- Suburb
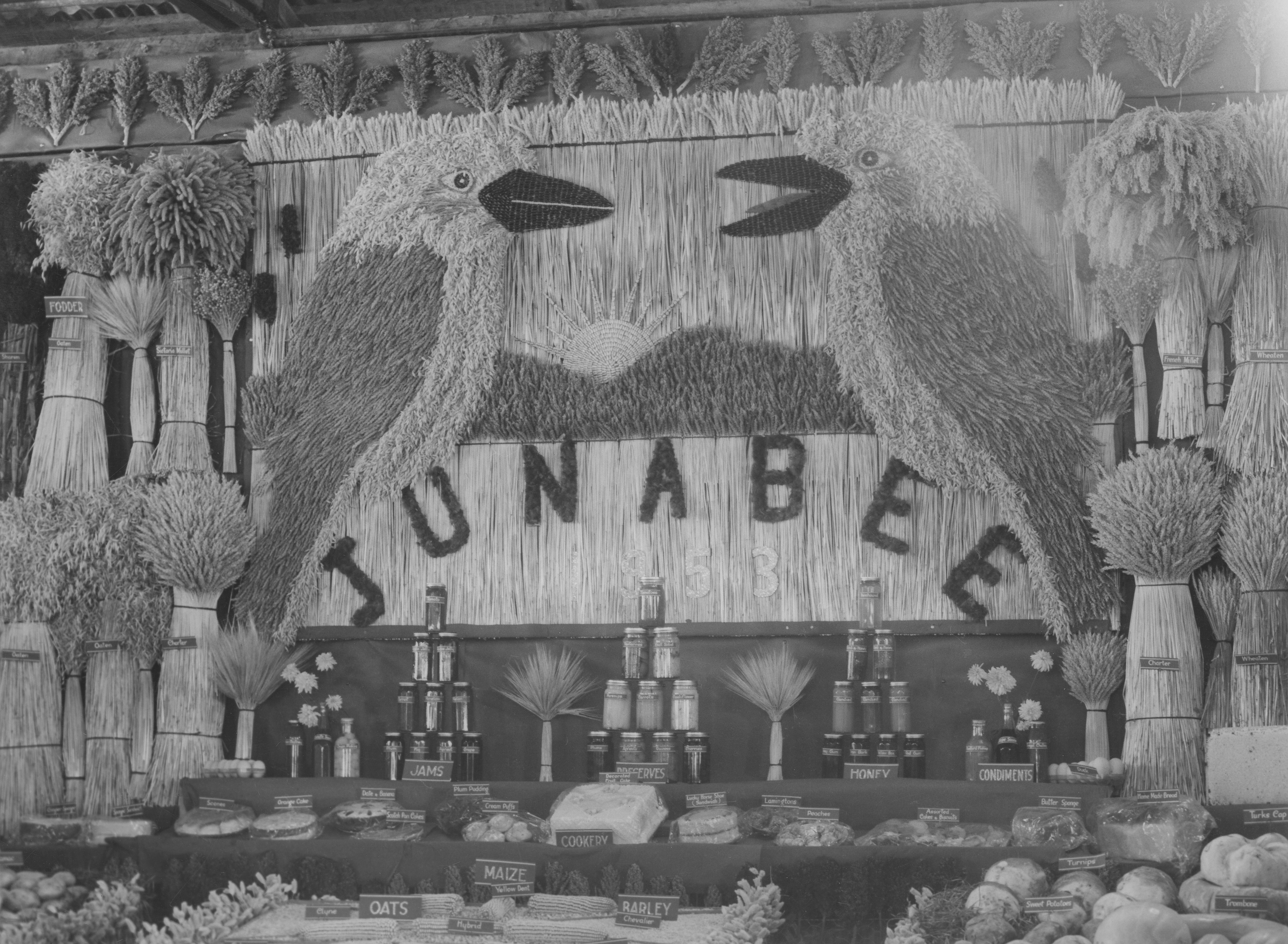
- Junabee exhibit at the Warwick Annual Show, 1953

- Interactive map of Junabee
- Coordinates: 28.25°S 152.1461°E
- Country: Australia
- State: Queensland
- LGA: Southern Downs Region
- Location: 14.8 km (9.2 mi) ESE of Warwick; 125 km (78 mi) SW of Ipswich; 167 km (104 mi) SW of Brisbane

Government
  - State electorate: Southern Downs
  - Federal division: Maranoa

Area
  - Total: 70.2 km^{2} (27.1 sq mi)

Population
  - Total: 195 (2021 census)
  - Density: 2.778/km^{2} (7.194/sq mi)
- Time zone: UTC+10:00 (AEST)
- Postcode: 4370
Suburbs around Junabee
Mount Tabor; The Hermitage	Swan Creek; Yangan	Emu Vale
Canningvale	Junabee	Danderoo
Murrays Bridge	Loch Lomond	Wiyarra

Junabee is a rural locality in the Southern Downs Region, Queensland, Australia. In the 2021 census, Junabee had a population of 195 people.

== History ==
Junabee Provisional School opened in 1904. On 1 January 1909 it became Junabee State School. It closed on 1 May 1939, but reopened in 1953. It closed permanently on 28 January 1963.

A new public hall opened in Junabee on Wednesday 5 August 1908.

Jingarry State School opened on 4 August 1919. It closed on 28 January 1963. It was at 439 Jingarry Mount Sturt Road (28.2370°S 152.1717°E).

St George's Anglican Church held its first service on 4 March 1945. It closed in 1973. However, there are mentions of an earlier church dating back to 1908.

On 5 January 1946, the Junabee Memorial Hall was opened at 573 Roona Road (28.2509°S 152.1450°E). The hall commemorates those who served in World War I and World War II.

== Demographics ==
In the 2016 census, Junabee had a population of 213 people.

In the 2021 census, Junabee had a population of 195 people.

== Education ==
There are no schools in Junabee. The nearest government primary schools are Warwick East State School in Warwick to the west, Yangan State School in Yangan to the north-east and Murray's Bridge State School in Murrays Bridge to the south. The nearest government secondary school is Warwick State High School in Warwick.
