= Mount Tabor, Queensland =

Mount Tabor
- Suburb
- Interactive map of Mount Tabor
- Coordinates: 28.2161°S 152.0680°E
- Country: Australia
- State: Queensland
- LGA: Southern Downs Region
- Location: 3.9 km (2.4 mi) E of Warwick; 83.9 km (52.1 mi) S of Toowoomba; 159 km (99 mi) SW of Brisbane

Government
  - State electorate: Southern Downs
  - Federal division: Maranoa

Area
  - Total: 6.5 km^{2} (2.5 sq mi)

Population
  - Total: 19 (2021 census)
  - Density: 2.92/km^{2} (7.57/sq mi)
- Time zone: UTC+10:00 (AEST)
- Postcode: 4370
Suburbs around Mount Tabor
Sladevale	Sladevale	The Hermitage
Warwick	Mount Tabor	Junabee
Warwick	Canningvale	Canningvale

Mount Tabor is a rural locality in the Southern Downs Region, Queensland, Australia. In the 2021 census, Mount Tabor had a population of 19 people.

== Geography ==
The locality is bounded to the south by the Condamine River.

The land use is a mixture of grazing on native vegetation and crop growing.

== History ==
The locality was named and bounded on 14 September 2001.

== Demographics ==
In the 2016 census, Mount Tabor had a population of 76 people.

In the 2021 census, Mount Tabor had a population of 19 people.

== Education ==
There are no schools in Mount Tabor, but there are numerous schools in neighbouring Warwick. The nearest government primary schools are Warwick East State School and Glennie Heights State School both in neighbouring Warwick to the west. The nearest government secondary school is Warwick State High School, also in Warwick.
