= Loch Lomond, Queensland =

Loch Lomond
- Suburb
- Interactive map of Loch Lomond
- Coordinates: 28.3305°S 152.1933°E
- Country: Australia
- State: Queensland
- LGA: Southern Downs Region
- Location: 21.0 km (13.0 mi) SE of Warwick; 104 km (65 mi) S of Toowoomba; 174 km (108 mi) SW of Brisbane

Government
  - State electorate: Southern Downs
  - Federal division: Maranoa

Area
  - Total: 69.0 km^{2} (26.6 sq mi)

Population
  - Total: 119 (2021 census)
  - Density: 1.725/km^{2} (4.467/sq mi)
- Time zone: UTC+10:00 (AEST)
- Postcode: 4370
Suburbs around Loch Lomond
Junabee	Junabee	Wiyarra
Murrays Bridge	Loch Lomond	Tannymorel
Elbow Valley	Elbow Valley	Killarney

Loch Lomond is a rural locality in the Southern Downs Region, Queensland, Australia. In the 2021 census, Loch Lomond had a population of 119 people.

== History ==
The locality takes its name from Loch Lomond in Scotland.

Loch Lomond Provisional School opened on 23 November 1903. On 1 January 1909 it became Loch Lomond State School. It closed on 13 February 1976. It was on the southern corner of Warwick Killarney Road and Mckee Road (28.3166°S 152.2017°E).

The Presbyterian Church was officially opened on Sunday 20 August 1905, having been relocated from Tanneymorel. It was damaged in a cyclone in December 1915. It was on the south-eastern corner of Warwick Killarney Road and Middle Road (28.3154°S 152.2019°E).

== Demographics ==
In the 2016 census, Loch Lomond had a population of 106 people.

In the 2021 census, Loch Lomond had a population of 119 people.

== Education ==
There are no schools in Loch Lomond. The nearest government primary schools are Murray's Bridge State School in neighbouring Murrays Bridge to the west and Killarney State School in neighbouring Killarney to the south-east. The nearest government secondary schools are Killarney State School (to Year 10 only) and Warwick State High School (to Year 12) in Warwick to the north-west
