= Sladevale, Queensland =

Sladevale
- Suburb
- Interactive map of Sladevale
- Coordinates: 28.1647°S 152.0877°E
- Country: Australia
- State: Queensland
- LGA: Southern Downs Region
- Location: 5.6 km (3.5 mi) NE of Warwick; 85 km (53 mi) S of Toowoomba; 114 km (71 mi) SW of Ipswich; 154 km (96 mi) SW of Brisbane

Government
  - State electorate: Southern Downs
  - Federal division: Maranoa

Area
  - Total: 35.6 km^{2} (13.7 sq mi)

Population
  - Total: 433 (2021 census)
  - Density: 12.163/km^{2} (31.50/sq mi)
- Time zone: UTC+10:00 (AEST)
- Postcode: 4370
Suburbs around Sladevale
Willowvale	Glengallan; Clintonvale	Freestone
Womina	Sladevale	Swan Creek
Warwick	Mount Tabor	The Hermitage

Sladevale is a rural locality in the Southern Downs Region, Queensland, Australia. In the 2021 census, Sladevale had a population of 433 people.

== History ==
In 1897, the residents of Campbell's Plains began to lobby for a school, declaring in 1898 that there were more than fifty children in the district. In 1899, the Queensland Government called for tenders to erect the school and teacher's residence. Campbell's Plains State School opened on 13 November 1899 under headmaster James Allen Ferguson. In 1900, the post office at the school was renamed Sladevale because the name Campbell's Plains was too common. In 1903, the school was renamed Sladevale State School. The school closed in 1932 and its teacher's resident relocated to Applethorpe. Local residents tried to have the school re-opened in 1937 without success. In 1944, it was agreed to re-open the school with about 17 students. It closed on 28 April 1967. It was at 12739 Cunningham Highway (28.16595°S 152.07166°E).

Campbells Plains railway station (28.1505°S 152.1030°E) and Sladevale railway station (28.17451°S 152.06909°E) were on the former Maryvale railway line.

== Demographics ==
In the 2016 census, Sladevale had a population of 381 people.

In the 2021 census, Sladevale had a population of 433 people.

== Education ==
There are no schools in Sladevale. The nearest government primary schools are Glennie Heights State School and Warwick East State School, both in neighbouring Warwick to the south-west and Freestone State School in neighbouring Freestone to the north. The nearest government secondary school is Warwick State High School, also in Warwick.

There are also a number of non-government schools in Warwick.

== Facilities ==
Warwick Solar Farm was developed by the University of Queensland at 115 Mcmahon Road (28.1830°S 152.0718°E). It has over 200,000 solar panels capable of powering more than 25,000 homes per year.
