= Canningvale, Queensland =

Canningvale
- Suburb
- Interactive map of Canningvale
- Coordinates: 28.2491°S 152.0680°E
- Country: Australia
- State: Queensland
- LGA: Southern Downs Region
- Location: 7.3 km (4.5 mi) SE of Warwick; 89.9 km (55.9 mi) S of Toowoomba; 163 km (101 mi) SW of Brisbane

Government
  - State electorate: Southern Downs
  - Federal division: Maranoa

Area
  - Total: 13.6 km^{2} (5.3 sq mi)

Population
  - Total: 118 (2021 census)
  - Density: 8.68/km^{2} (22.47/sq mi)
- Time zone: UTC+10:00 (AEST)
- Postcode: 4370
Suburbs around Canningvale
Warwick	Mount Tabor	Junabee
Morgan Park	Canningvale	Junabee
Morgan Park	Wildash	Murrays Bridge

Canningvale is a rural locality in the Southern Downs Region, Queensland, Australia. In the 2021 census, Canningvale had a population of 118 people.

== History ==
Canningvale was previously known as Jews Retreat.

Jew's Retreat State School opened on 20 January 1913. In 1936, it was renamed Canning Vale State School. It closed in 1965. It was at on a 2-acre (0.81 ha) site at 453 Canningvale Road (28.24870°S 152.07459°E).

== Demographics ==
In the 2016 census, Canningvale had a population of 136 people.

In the 2021 census, Canningvale had a population of 118 people.

== Education ==
There are no schools in Canningvale. The nearest government primary schools are Warwick East State School in neighbouring Warwick to the north-west and Murray's Bridge State School in neighbouring Murrays Bridge to the south-east. The nearest government secondary school is Warwick State High School, also in Warwick.
