= Danderoo, Queensland =

Danderoo
- Suburb
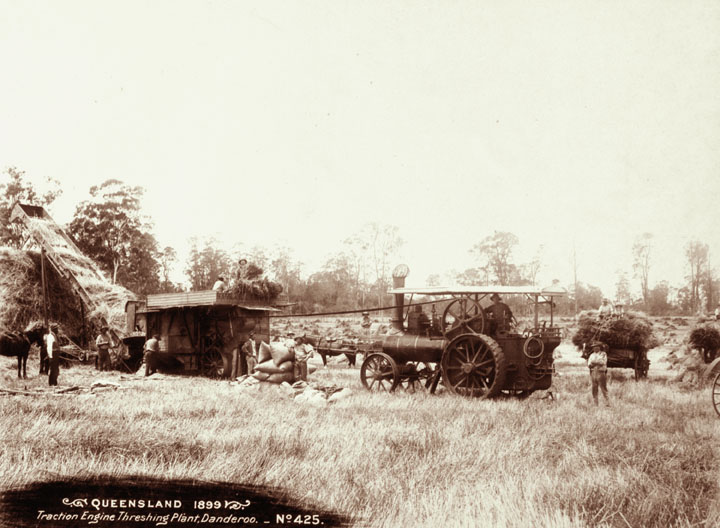
- Traction engine threshing, Danderoo, 1899

- Interactive map of Danderoo
- Coordinates: 28.2516°S 152.2288°E
- Country: Australia
- State: Queensland
- LGA: Southern Downs Region
- Location: 9.4 km (5.8 mi) S of Yangan; 12.9 km (8.0 mi) NNW of Killarney; 23.6 km (14.7 mi) E of Warwick; 168 km (104 mi) SW of Brisbane

Government
  - State electorate: Southern Downs
  - Federal division: Maranoa

Area
  - Total: 7.4 km^{2} (2.9 sq mi)

Population
  - Total: 40 (2021 census)
  - Density: 5.4/km^{2} (14.0/sq mi)
- Time zone: UTC+10:00 (AEST)
- Postcode: 4370
Suburbs around Danderoo
Junabee	Emu Vale	Emu Vale
Junabee	Danderoo	Emu Vale
Wiyarra	Wiyarra	Tannymorel

Danderoo is a rural locality in the Southern Downs Region, Queensland, Australia. In the 2021 census, Danderoo had a population of 40 people.

== Geography ==
The predominant land use is for crops with small areas of grazing on native vegetation.

== History ==
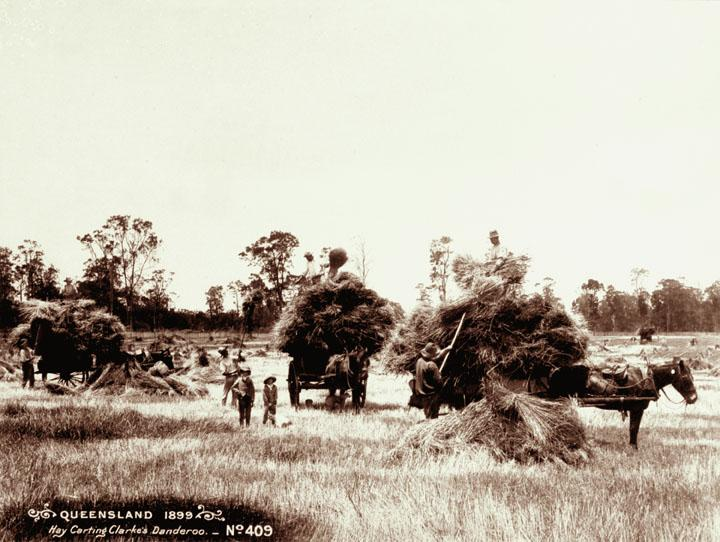
Hay carting at Clarke's farm, Danderoo, circa 1899

The name Danderoo is believed to be an Aboriginal word, meaning a place of killing, possibly referring to a clash between Aboriginal people and shepherds on Toolburra pastoral run in the 1840s.

The Killarney railway line was a branch railway of the Southern railway line, connecting Warwick to Killarney via Wiyarra . It operated from 1884 to 1964. Danderoo railway station was at 28.25287°S 152.23111°E, while Wiyarra railway station was at 28.26626°S 152.22227°E.

Danderoo State School opened on 22 January 1900. It celebrated its golden jubilee in 1950. It closed in 1964. It was on the western side of Yangan Killarney Road at the junction with Campbell Road (28.25825°S 152.23308°E).

== Demographics ==
In the 2016 census, Danderoo had a population of 30 people.

In the 2021 census, Danderoo had a population of 40 people.

== Education ==
There are no schools in Danderoo. The nearest government primary school is Yangan State School in Yangan to the north. The nearest government secondary schools are Killarney State School (to Year 10) in Killarney to the south-east and Warwick State High School (to Year 12) in Warwick to the west.
