= Southern Downs Local Heritage Register =

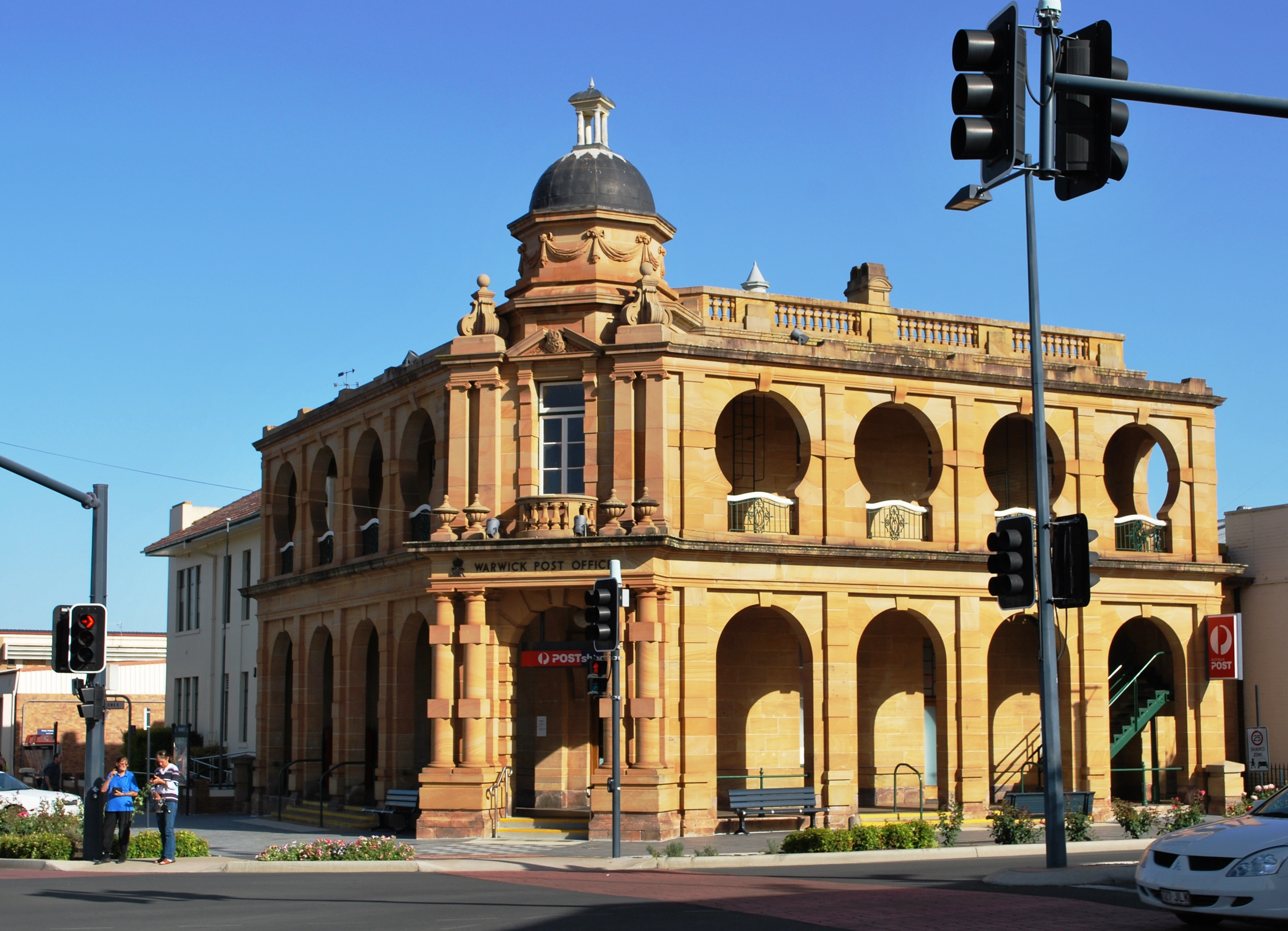
Warwick Post Office, listed on the Southern Downs Local Heritage Register

The Southern Downs Local Heritage Register is a heritage register of sites within the Southern Downs Region of Queensland, Australia.

== History ==
Under Section 113 of the Queensland Heritage Act 1992, all local government authorities in Queensland must maintain a local heritage register. Following the amalgamation of local government areas that created Southern Downs Region in 2008, it was necessary to create a new local heritage register. Following a cultural heritage study which completed in 2010, a proposed list of local heritage sites was provided for public comment in 2011.

The Southern Downs Local Heritage Register includes all sites within the Southern Downs Region that are on the Queensland Heritage Register plus additional sites of local heritage significance.
