= Murrays Bridge, Queensland =

Murrays Bridge
- Suburb
- Interactive map of Murrays Bridge
- Coordinates: 28.3116°S 152.1163°E
- Country: Australia
- State: Queensland
- LGA: Southern Downs Region
- Location: 15.3 km (9.5 mi) SE of Warwick; 131 km (81 mi) SW of Ipswich; 170 km (110 mi) SW of Brisbane

Government
  - State electorate: Southern Downs
  - Federal division: Maranoa

Area
  - Total: 47.0 km^{2} (18.1 sq mi)

Population
  - Total: 106 (2021 census)
  - Density: 2.255/km^{2} (5.84/sq mi)
- Time zone: UTC+10:00 (AEST)
- Postcode: 4370
Suburbs around Murrays Bridge
Canningvale	Junabee	Junabee
Wildash	Murrays Bridge	Loch Lomond
Wildash	Wildash	Elbow Valley

Murrays Bridge is a rural locality in the Southern Downs Region, Queensland, Australia. In the 2021 census, Murrays Bridge had a population of 106 people.

== Geography ==
Murrays Bridge is flat land (about 500 metres above sea level), entirely freehold and used for agriculture, principally grazing but also some cropping near the river. The Condamine River flows through the locality from south-east to the north-west. The Warwick-Killarney Road passes through the locality from the north-east to the north-west.

== History ==
Murray's Bridge State School opened on 1 June 1937. On 2 May 1987, the school celebrated 50 years of schooling by the unveiling of a monument by the school's first teacher Janet Smith (née Turnbull).

== Demographics ==
In the 2016 census, Murrays Bridge had a population of 103 people.

In the 2021 census, Murrays Bridge had a population of 106 people.

== Education ==
Murray's Bridge State School is a government primary (Prep–6) school for boys and girls at 1378 Killarney Road (28.2929°S 152.1179°E). In 2016, the school had an enrolment of 12 students with 2 teachers and 5 non-teaching staff (2 full-time equivalent). In 2018, the school had an enrolment of 12 students with 2 teachers and 7 non-teaching staff (2 full-time equivalent).

There are no secondary schools in Murrays Bridge. The nearest government secondary school is Warwick State High School in Warwick to the north-west.

There are also a number of non-government schools in Warwick.
