= Southern Downs Region =

Coordinates: 28°13′05.65″S 152°00′42.75″E

- Local government area
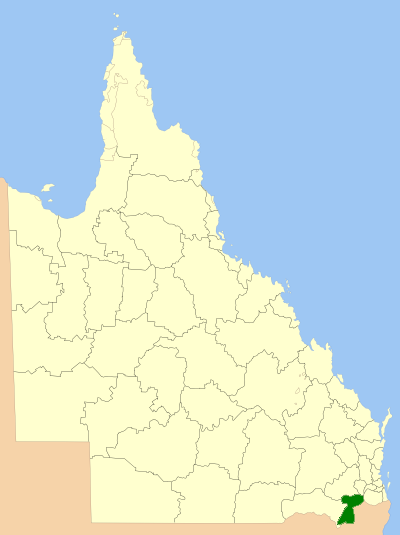
- Location within Queensland

- Interactive map of Southern Downs Region
- Country: Australia
- State: Queensland
- Region: Darling Downs
- Established: 2008
- Council seat: Warwick

Government
  - Mayor: Melissa Jane Hamilton
  - State electorate: Southern Downs
  - Federal division: Maranoa

Area
  - Total: 7,088 km^{2} (2,737 sq mi)

Population
  - Total: 36,290 (2021 census)
  - Density: 5.1199/km^{2} (13.2605/sq mi)
- Website: Southern Downs Region
LGAs around Southern Downs Region
Toowoomba	Toowoomba	Lockyer Valley
Goondiwindi	Southern Downs Region	Scenic Rim
Goondiwindi	Tenterfield (NSW)	Tenterfield (NSW)

The Southern Downs Region is a local government area (LGA) in the Darling Downs region of Queensland, Australia. The region runs along the state's southern boundary with New South Wales and was created in 2008 from a merger of the Shire of Warwick and the Shire of Stanthorpe. As at 2024, it has an area of 7,088 square kilometres (2,737 sq mi).

In the 2021 census, the Southern Downs Region had a population of 36,290 people.

== History ==
The majority of the former Warwick Shire is home to the Githabul people who have lived around this area for tens of thousands of years before the arrival of Europeans in the early 1840s.

The current area of the Southern Downs Region existed as two distinct local government areas:

- the Shire of Warwick; which in turn consisted of four previous local government areas:
  - the City of Warwick;
  - the Shire of Allora;
  - the Shire of Glengallan;
  - the Shire of Rosenthal;
- and the Shire of Stanthorpe.

The City of Warwick came into being as the Warwick Municipality on 25 May 1861 under the Municipalities Act 1858, a piece of New South Wales legislation inherited by Queensland at its separation two years earlier. On 21 July 1869, the Municipality of Allora was established under the Municipal Institutions Act 1864.

On 11 November 1879, the Clifton, Glengallan and Stanthorpe Divisions were created as three of 74 divisions within Queensland under the Divisional Boards Act 1879. In 1886, Rosenthal was created out of parts of Glengallan.

With the passage of the Local Authorities Act 1902, Warwick and Allora became Towns and the four Divisions became Shires. On 23 January 1915 the Town of Allora was abolished and a new Shire of Allora was created from the southern part of the Shire of Clifton.

On 4 April 1936, Warwick was proclaimed a city.

On 21 November 1991, the Electoral and Administrative Review Commission, created two years earlier, produced its second report, and recommended that local government boundaries in the Warwick area be rationalised. The Local Government (Allora, Glengallan, Rosenthal and Warwick) Regulation 1994 was gazetted on 20 May 1994. On 25 June, an election was held for the new Shire of Warwick, and on 1 July 1994, the original entities passed out of existence. Stanthorpe was unaffected by these changes.

In July 2007, the Local Government Reform Commission released its report and recommended that Warwick and Stanthorpe amalgamate. It noted that Warwick was the regional centre for the region, with the maximum travelling time between Warwick and any other town being one hour. Both councils opposed the amalgamation citing cultural differences and different river catchment areas and economic drivers. On 15 March 2008, the two Shires formally ceased to exist, and elections were held on the same day to elect eight councillors and a mayor to the Regional Council.

== Wards ==
The Southern Downs Region is not divided into wards/divisions for elections. All voters elect eight councillors and a mayor to serve a four-year term.

== Current council ==
The current council, elected in 2024, is:

Position	Councillor	Party
Mayor	Melissa Hamilton	Independent
Councillor	Sheryl Windle	Independent
Councillor	Ross Bartley	Independent
Councillor	Sarah Deane	Independent
Councillor	Morwenna Harslett	Independent
Councillor	Cynthia McDonald	Independent
Councillor	Carla Pidgeon	Independent
Councillor	Joel Richters	Independent Labor
Councillor	Russell Wantling	Independent

== Mayors ==
- 2008–2012 : Ron Bellingham
- 2012–2016: Peter Blundell
- 2016–2020: Tracy Dobie
- 2020–2024: Victor Frank Pennisi
- 2024–Present: Melissa Jane Hamilton

== Towns and localities ==
The Southern Downs Region includes the following settlements:

=== Warwick region ===
Warwick area:

- Warwick

Allora area:

- Allora
- Berat
- Clintonvale
- Deuchar
- Ellinthorp
- Goomburra
- Hendon
- Mount Marshall
- Talgai
- Willowvale^{*}

Glengallan area:

- Killarney
- Canningvale
- Danderoo
- Elbow Valley
- Emu Vale
- Freestone
- Gladfield
- Glengallan
- Junabee
- Loch Lomond
- Maryvale
- Morgan Park
- Mount Colliery
- Mount Sturt
- Mount Tabor
- Sladevale
- Swanfels
- Tannymorel
- The Falls
- Tregony
- Wiyarra
- Womina
- Yangan

Rosenthal area:

- Rosenthal Heights
- Allan
- Cunningham
- Dalveen
- Greymare
- Karara
- Leslie
- Leslie Dam
- Leyburn
- Palgrave
- Pratten
- Rosehill
- Thane
- Wheatvale

^{*} - not to be confused with Willow Vale, Queensland

=== Stanthorpe region ===
- Stanthorpe
- Amiens
- Applethorpe
- Ballandean
- Broadwater
- Cottonvale (Note: Named after Private E. Cotton, a local man who enlisted in the Australian Air Force.)
- Dalcouth
- Diamondvale
- Eukey
- Glen Aplin
- Greenlands
- Kyoomba
- Lyra
- Messines
- Mingoola
- Nundubbermere
- Passchendaele
- Pikedale
- Pikes Creek
- Pozieres
- Severnlea
- Somme
- The Summit
- Thorndale
- Wallangarra
- Wyberba

== Libraries ==
The Southern Downs Regional Council operates public libraries at Allora, Stanthorpe, and Warwick. It also operates a mobile library servicing Dalveen, Karara, Killarney, Leyburn, Maryvale, Pratten, Wheatvale and Yangan.

== Demographics ==
The populations given relate to the component entities prior to 2008. The 2011 census was the first for the Southern Downs Region.

Year	Population (Region total)	Population (Stanthorpe)	Population (Warwick)	Population (Allora)	Population (Glengallan)	Population (Rosenthal)	Notes
1933	25,016	6,934	6,664	2,624	6,334	2,460	
1947	24,009	7,419	7,129	2,217	5,269	1,975	
1954	25,862	8,335	9,151	2,106	4,639	1,631	
1961	26,288	8,514	9,843	1,961	4,388	1,582	
1966	25,917	8,503	10,065	1,890	3,906	1,553	
1971	24,115	8,189	9,303	1,719	3,410	1,494	
1976	24,583	8,709	9,169	1,666	3,491	1,548	
1981	24,300	8,576	8,853	1,679	3,611	1,581	
1986	26,270	9,143	9,435	2,041	3,688	1,963	
1991	28,288	9,556	10,393	2,132	3,966	2,241	
1996	29,563	9,596	10,896	2,234	3,990	2,742	
2001	30,554	9,860	10,956	2,439	4,088	3,129	
2006	31,385	9,968	11,143	2,437	4,169	3,558	
2011 census	33,883						
2016 census	35,110						
2021 census	36,290						
