= Warwick East State School =

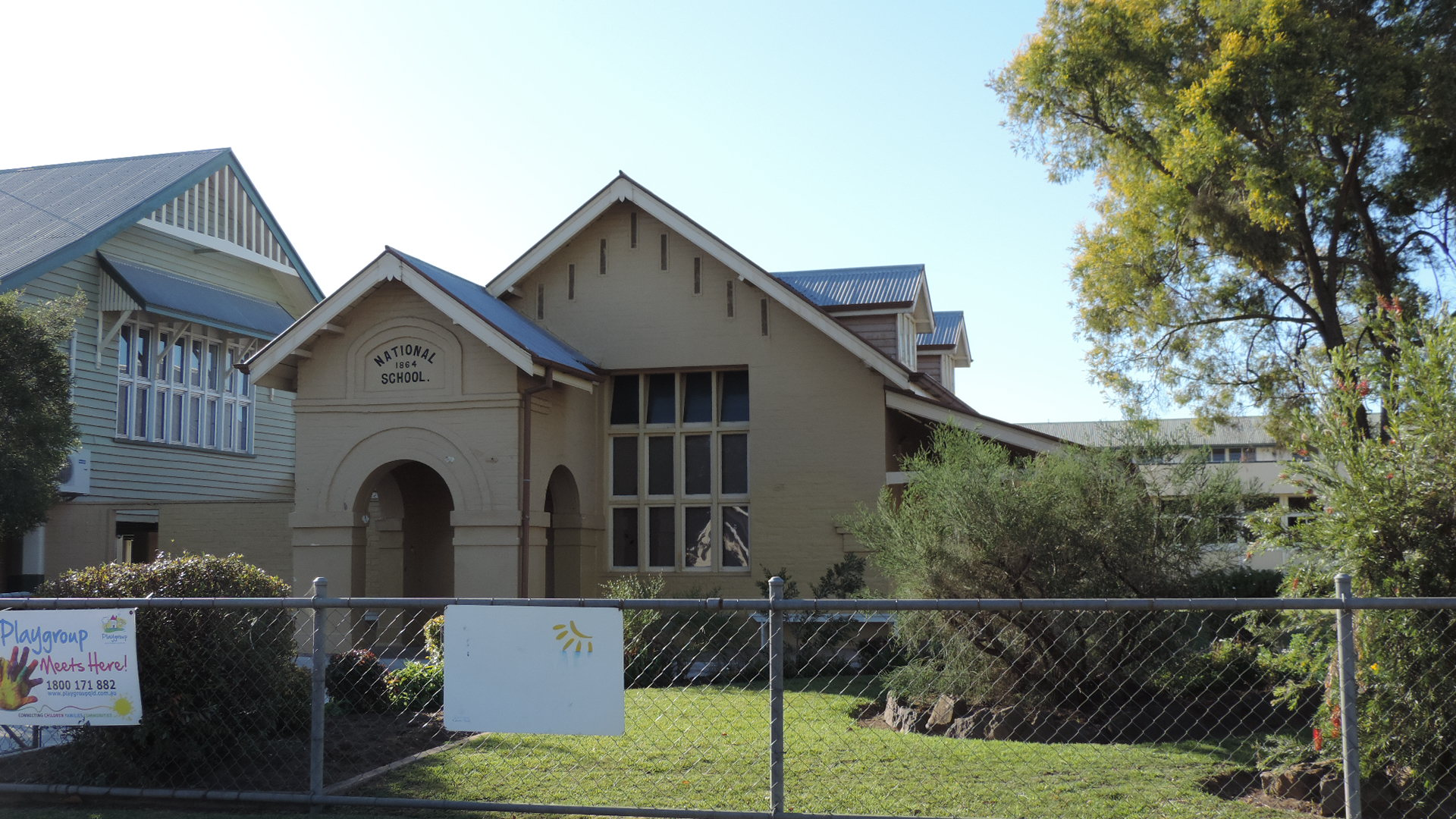
- Warwick East State School, 2015

- Location within Queensland Location within Australia
- 28.2144°S 152.0392°E
- Location: 45 Fitzroy Street, Warwick, Southern Downs Region, Queensland, Australia

History
- Design period: 1840s–1860s (mid-19th century)
- Built: 1864–1912

Site notes
- Architect: Benjamin Joseph Backhouse
- Architectural style: Classicism

Queensland Heritage Register
- Official name: Warwick East State School, Warwick National School
- Type: state heritage (built)
- Designated: 21 October 1992
- Reference no.: 600947
- Significant period: 1860s (historical); 1860–1910s (fabric); 1860s–ongoing (social)
- Significant components: school/school room

Warwick East State School, also known as Warwick National School, is the oldest state primary school in Queensland that is currently still open. It was designed by Benjamin Joseph Backhouse and built from 1864 to 1912. It is a heritage-listed building that was added to the Queensland Heritage Register on 21 October 1992.

== History ==
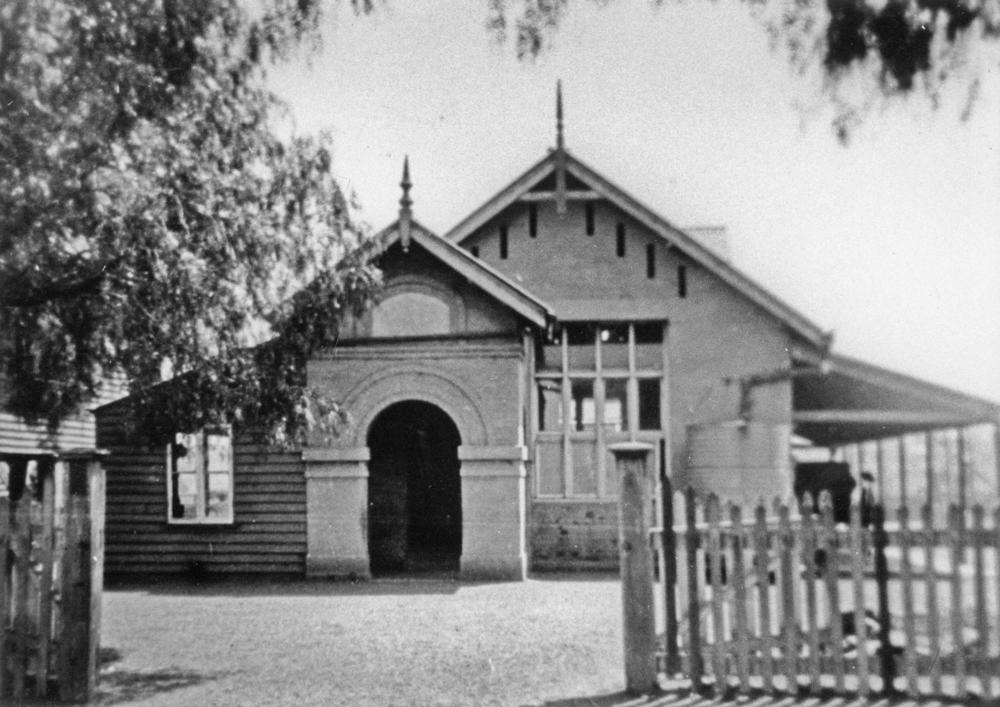
Front view of the Warwick East Central State School, circa 1928

The former Warwick National School is a one storeyed brick building which was constructed in 1864 to designs of early Queensland architect, Benjamin Backhouse.

The first surveys were carried out in Warwick by James Charles Burnett in April, 1850, with the first land sale following soon after in July of that year. On 25 May 1861 Warwick was declared a municipality (the Borough of Warwick) and continued to grow steadily as the service centre of the Southern Darling Downs. During the 1860s the tradition of building permanent masonry buildings in Warwick began.

The first school in Warwick was established by the Board of National Education on 25 October 1850. This was set up largely as the result of efforts by local pioneer, George Leslie who was concerned about the education of his own children and those of other families in the district. He started making enquires to the Board of National Education in September 1848 but it was not until September 1850 that the school was actually established with thirty students.

The first headmaster was a George Abbott, and the school ran until December 1852 when it closed until April 1853 re-opening with George Lewis as the headmaster. Jonathan Harris was appointed headmaster in 1855 and retained this position until 1860.

Before separation in 1859, the NSW Board of National Education, set up by Governor Charles Augustus FitzRoy in 1848, was charged with establishing and administering schools, and it was under provisions from this body that four National Schools were established in what was to become Queensland. The Warwick National School was the first of these and a school was established in Drayton in 1851. By 1860 a boys and girls school were established in Brisbane.

After Queensland separated from New South Wales in 1859, the newly formed Queensland Government became responsible for the education services provided in the new colony. The Education Act of 1860 saw the establishment of a Board of Education combining the roles of the former National and Denominational Schools of NSW.

After the 1860 Act the Warwick National School, along with the three other government schools, came under the jurisdiction of the newly created Board of Education. Soon after this, in 1864–65, the present brick building was constructed on the site to designs of prominent architect, Benjamin Backhouse. This building joined an earlier timber structure used as a classroom, constructed at the school's inception in 1850.

Backhouse, who was based in Brisbane from mid 1861 until late 1868, designed many of the early National Schools for the newly created Board, including those at Toowoomba, Condamine, Laidley, Maryborough, Bowen, Nanango, Bald Hills and Goondiwindi. He was responsible for many early permanent churches in Queensland, including the former St Mary's Roman Catholic Church in Warwick, the now demolished Union Presbyterian Church in Brisbane and St Stephen's Roman Catholic Cathedral.

When completed the National School at Warwick was a single storeyed brick building, with asymmetrically placed entrance porch and small windows lining the eastern and western elevations of the building. By 1874 the buildings which comprised the Warwick National School were considered inadequate for the growing town and the establishment of a new school, the Warwick Central State School, was planned. The foundation stone was laid on 25 June 1874 by the Mayor, at a celebration attended by not less than 2000 people. When this new school, on the corner of Guy and Percy Streets, opened in 1875, the former Warwick National School, became known as the Warwick East State School, a name it retains to this day.

By 1878, the Inspector for Schools recommended that two ten feet wide verandahs be added to the 1864 brick building at Warwick East State School on the east and west sides, and that a northern end verandah be enclosed to house lavatories and classrooms. This work was carried out at a cost of £175.

By 1911 the site of the Warwick East State School was considered to be unfavourably situated, the surroundings are inimical to children's health and morals, bounded by an open sewer conveying drainage from the lower parts of the town and on the northern boundary lived people of suspicious morals, and to the south was a miserable hovel touching the school fence. The concern of the parents in writing these complaints seems to revolve around attracting an appropriate teacher. However, a new site was not found and various improvements were carried out to the existing buildings.

The provision of lighting and ventilation in the 1864 brick building was inadequate and concerns were voiced in 1912 by the Public Works Department that these problems be addressed. The multi-pane window on the southern elevation was enlarged and two dormer windows were inserted on the eastern side of the corrugated iron roof. Concrete floors were formed in both the interior of the school and the verandahs and the walls, which were formerly face brick, were kalsomined. A hat room which had been added adjoining the east of the entrance porch was removed.

Later school buildings were gradually added to the site, but the early brick building remains the focal point and is remarkably intact. It is now used as a school hall, and classroom for music classes.

== Description ==
The former Warwick National School is situated within the school grounds of the Warwick East State School, in Fitzroy Street, Warwick. The former National School is prominently sited in the school grounds, facing the main entrance and surrounded by well tended gardens.

The simple one storeyed building has a rectangular plan and is constructed of painted brick, on a rendered plinth. The gabled corrugated iron roof of the school is punctuated on the eastern facade with two timber boarded dormer windows, of three operable single paned casements.

The south, principal entrance elevation features a projecting gabled porch, aligned with the western wall and extending about halfway along the facade. The square planned porch has round arched openings on the three external faces, which are formed with four brick courses, the two outer courses slightly projecting from the face of the wall. The arches spring from rendered string courses below which the brickwork is also rendered. On the face of the southern elevation is a large twelve paned window, of two generations of construction. Following the line of the gable, and slightly below the eaves are a series of elongated rectangular ventilation openings. Below these, sitting on a string course is an arched rendered signage panel outlined with two courses of projecting brick headers. The symmetrically arranged northern elevation has similar ventilation openings and a centrally located twelve paned window.

The western elevation is protected by a single storeyed skillion roofed verandah supported on square sectioned timber columns. The northern end of the verandah is infilled with horizontal timber weatherboards. The face of the western wall has six vertical sash four paned windows, symmetrically arranged flanking a centrally located doorway. The rendered sills of the window sit on a projecting brick course supported on brick corbels. The arched brick window surrounds are outlined with a projecting course of bricks. The base of the wall is rendered to the underside of the brick window sill corbels, and a three tier brick string course runs along the wall at mid-height.

The eastern elevation is similar in arrangement to that of the western, with open verandah, details and arrangement of openings. The arched window openings, however, extend from the mid-height string course upwards, and are glazed with centrally hung hopper windows.

Internally, the building is undivided, and the roof which is lined with timber boards is supported on king post trusses with struts. The interior walls are painted brick, with a rendered base, and the floor throughout is timber boards laid on a concrete slab. At the northern end of the room is a stage accessed by five room-width steps.

== Heritage listing ==
Warwick East State School was listed on the Queensland Heritage Register on 21 October 1992 having satisfied the following criteria.

The place is important in demonstrating the evolution or pattern of Queensland's history.

The former National School provides evidence of the growth of Warwick during the 1860s, and as one of the earliest surviving government school building in Queensland, the development of the education system in the State. The building demonstrates the early period of Queensland school architecture, of substantially constructed masonry buildings soon after which the buildings were built principally of timber.

The place is important in demonstrating the principal characteristics of a particular class of cultural places.

The building is a good intact example of the work of Benjamin Backhouse, and demonstrates the principal characteristics of early schoolhouses, as a single room building changed over time as concern for ventilation and lighting became important aspects of institutional buildings.

The place is important because of its aesthetic significance.

The building is simple but well composed and adds to the streetscape of Fitzroy Street. The former National School is well set among gardens within the Warwick East State School grounds.

The place has a strong or special association with a particular community or cultural group for social, cultural or spiritual reasons.

The building is valued by the community as the earliest school building in Queensland and as a public place attended by many of the local people.

== See also ==
- List of Australian heritage lists
- List of schools in Darling Downs
- List of schools in Queensland
- Lists of schools in Australia
