= Warwick, Queensland =

Warwick
- Town
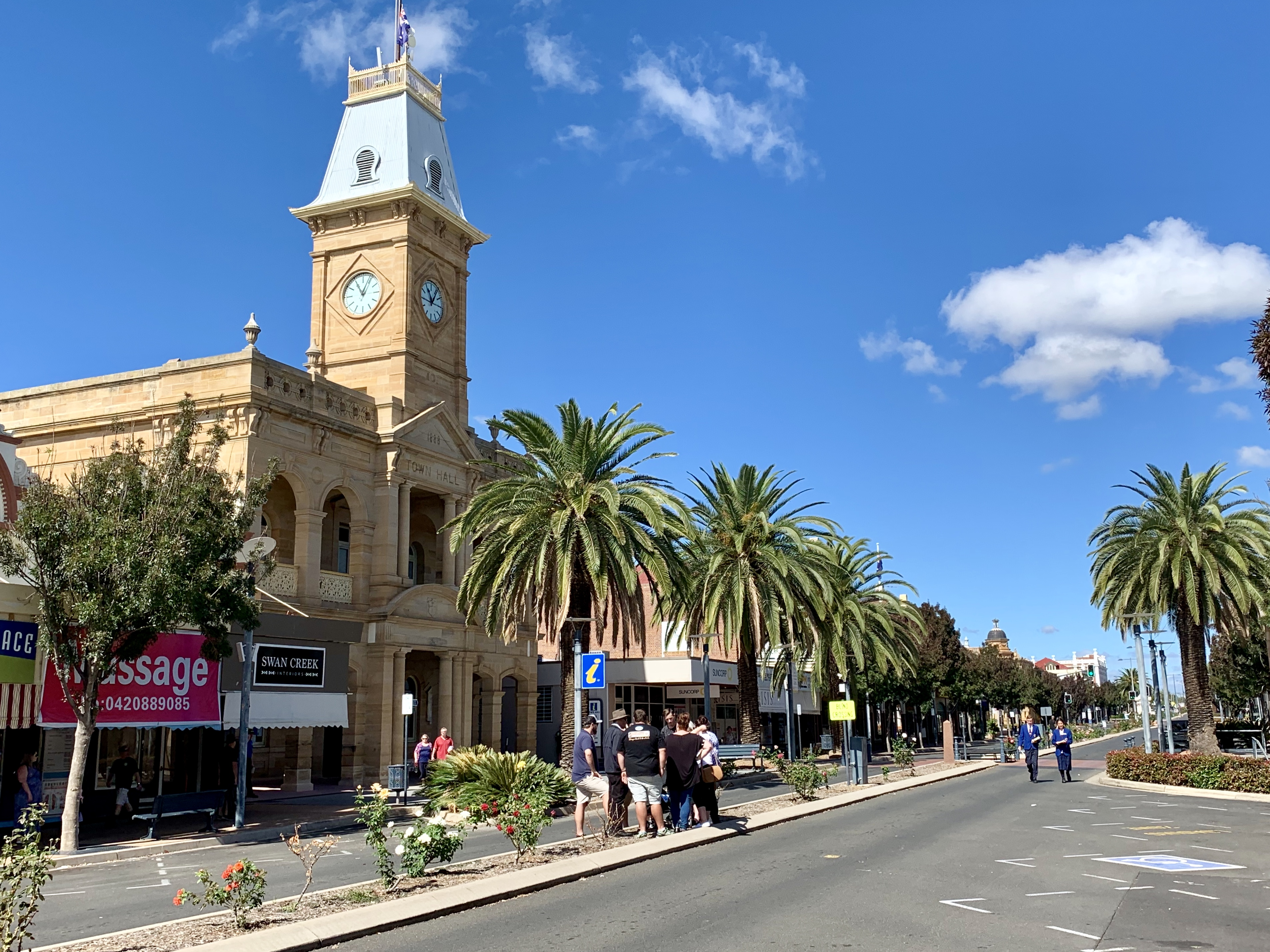
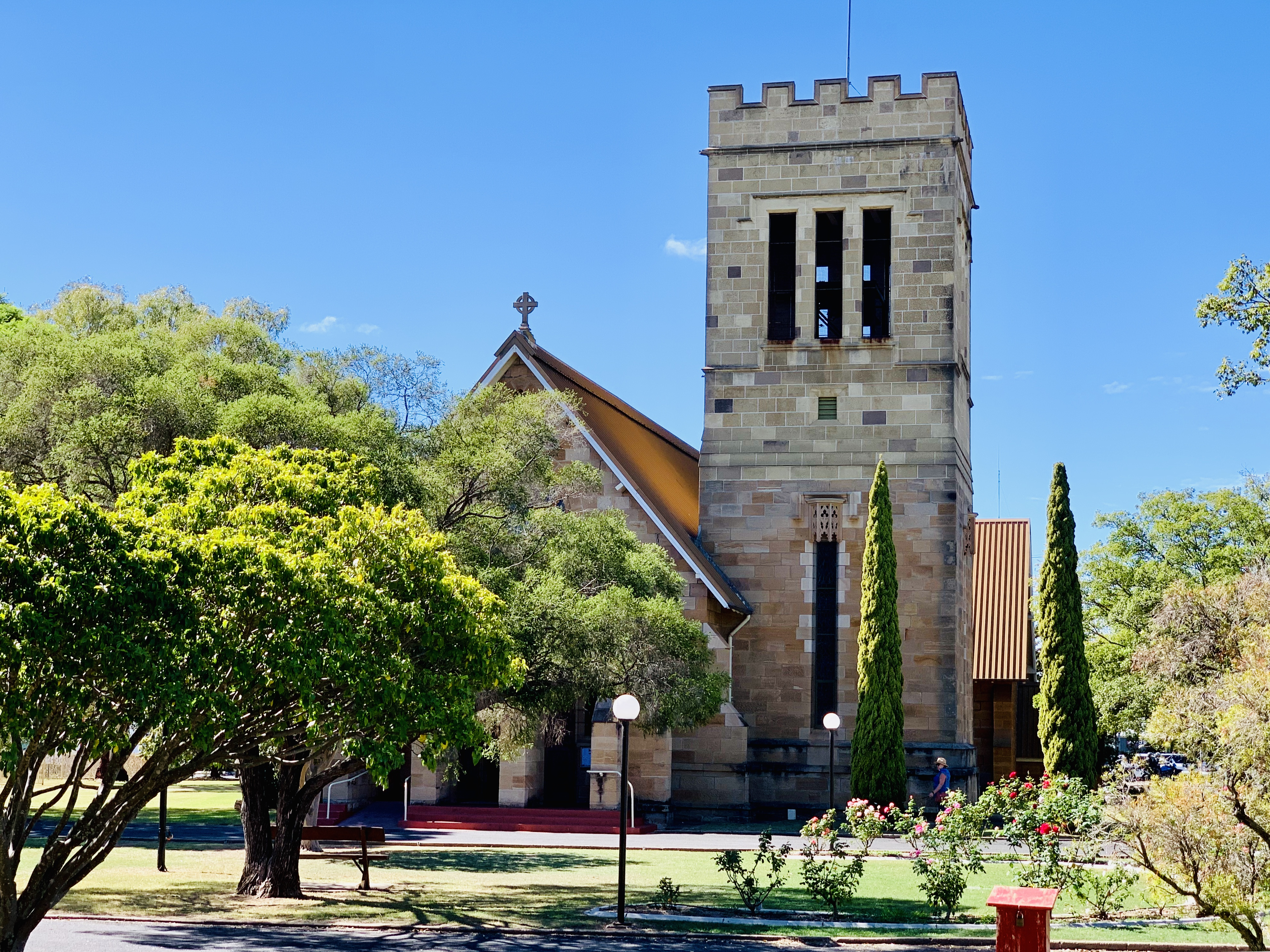
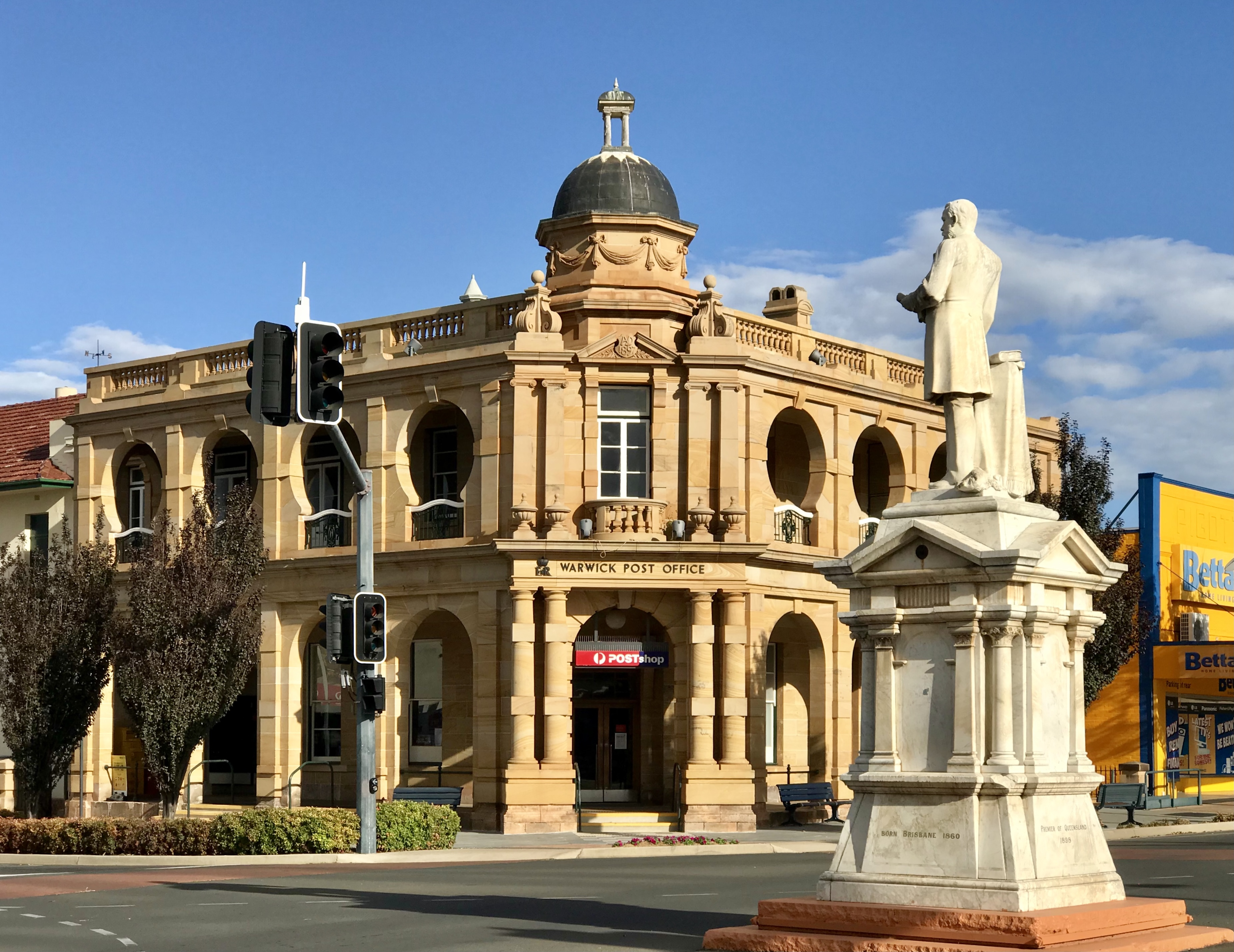
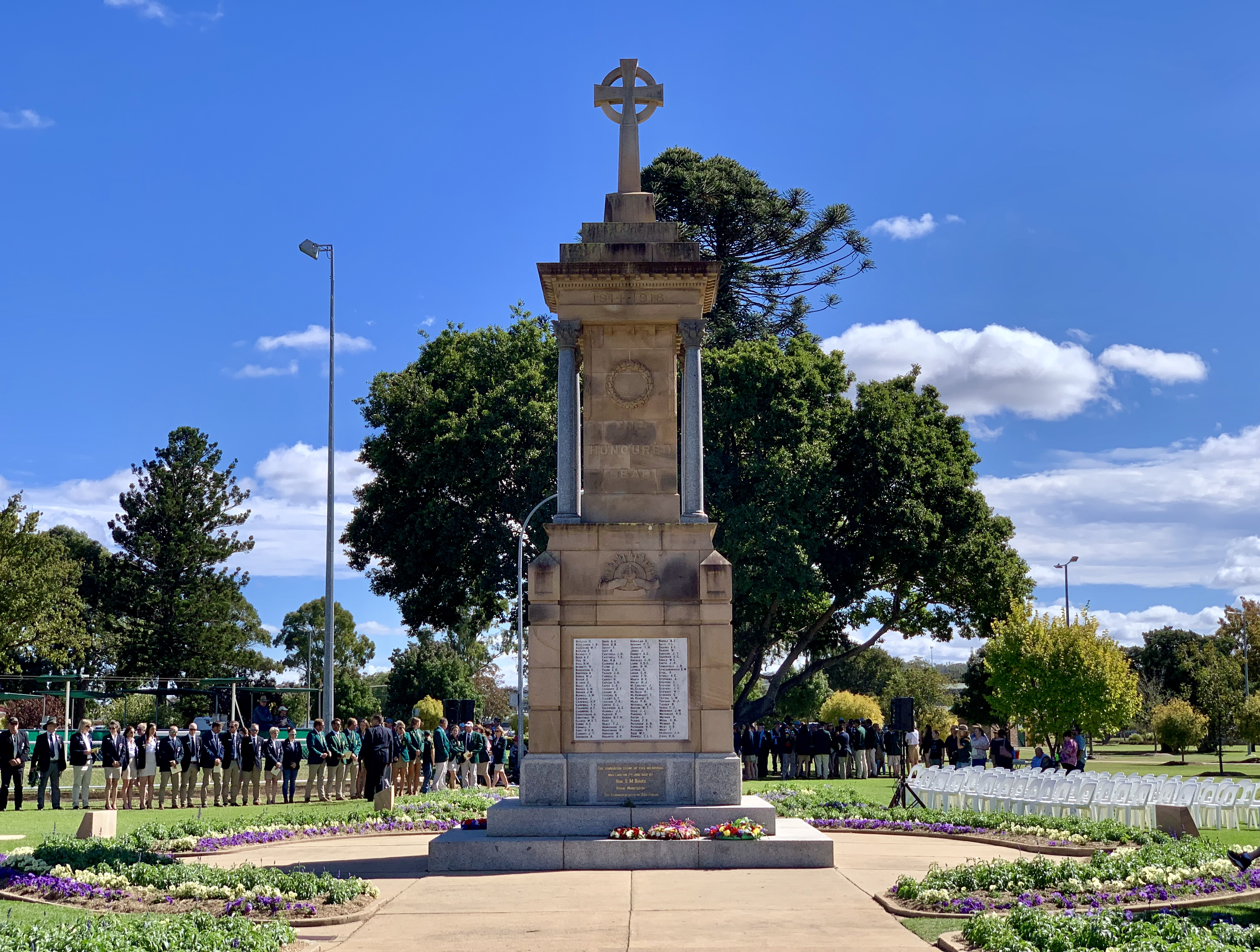
- From left to right; Warwick Town Hall, St Mark's Church; Warwick Post Office, Warwick War Memorial

- Interactive map of Warwick
- Coordinates: 28.2152°S 152.0352°E
- Country: Australia
- State: Queensland
- LGA: Southern Downs Region
- Location: 60 km (37 mi) N of Stanthorpe; 73 km (45 mi) S of Toowoomba; 130 km (81 mi) SW of Brisbane; 140 km (87 mi) W of Gold Coast; 236 km (147 mi) E of Goondiwindi
- Established: 1850

Government
  - State electorate: Southern Downs
  - Federal division: Maranoa

Area
  - Total: 29.5 km^{2} (11.4 sq mi)
- Elevation: 477 m (1,565 ft)

Population
  - Total: 12,294 (2021 census)
  - Density: 416.7/km^{2} (1,079.4/sq mi)
- Postcode: 4370
- County: Merivale
- Mean max temp: 24.2 °C (75.6 °F)
- Mean min temp: 10.8 °C (51.4 °F)
- Annual rainfall: 692.1 mm (27.25 in)
Localities around Warwick
Allan	Womina	Sladevale
Rosenthal Heights	Warwick	Mount Tabor
Rosenthal Heights	Morgan Park	Canningvale

Warwick (/ˈwɒrɪk/ WORR-ik) is a rural town and locality in southeast Queensland, Australia, lying 130 kilometres (81 mi) south-west of Brisbane. It is the administrative centre of the Southern Downs Region local government area. The surrounding Darling Downs have fostered a strong agricultural industry for which Warwick, together with the larger city of Toowoomba, serve as convenient service centres. In the 2021 census, the locality of Warwick had a population of 12,294 people.

== Geography ==
The Condamine River meanders from the east to the north-west of Warwick. One of its tributaries, Rosenthal Creek, enters Warwick from the south and enters the Condamine within Warwick.

The Cunningham Highway and the New England Highway jointly enter Warwick from the north, cross the Condamine River, and then turn west within the town close to the Warwick central business district. The Cunningham Highway then continues west towards Goondiwindi, while the New England Highway heads south towards Stanthorpe.

The Condamine River often floods, which can disconnect the northern and southern parts of Warwick and close the highways. Gauges that measure river height are used to provide flood alerts to residents. Low-lying land around the river is mostly used for recreation to minimise the damage caused by flooding with most developed areas at higher levels. Queens Park is a major park based around the river and the highway crossing.

The Warwick central business district is laid out on a grid pattern and lies within one or two blocks of the long main street, Palmerin Street with Grafton Street the major cross-street. The statue of former Queensland Premier Thomas Byrnes is located at their intersection.

== History ==
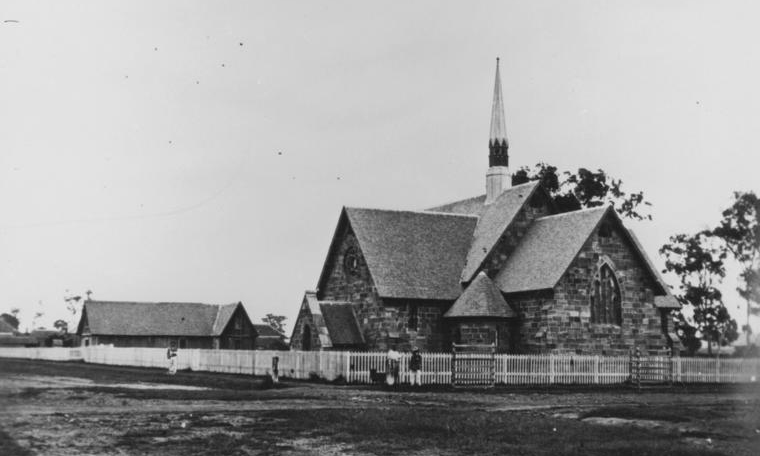
Second St. Mark's Church of England, Warwick, ca. 1872, the first (wooden) church can be seen in the background.

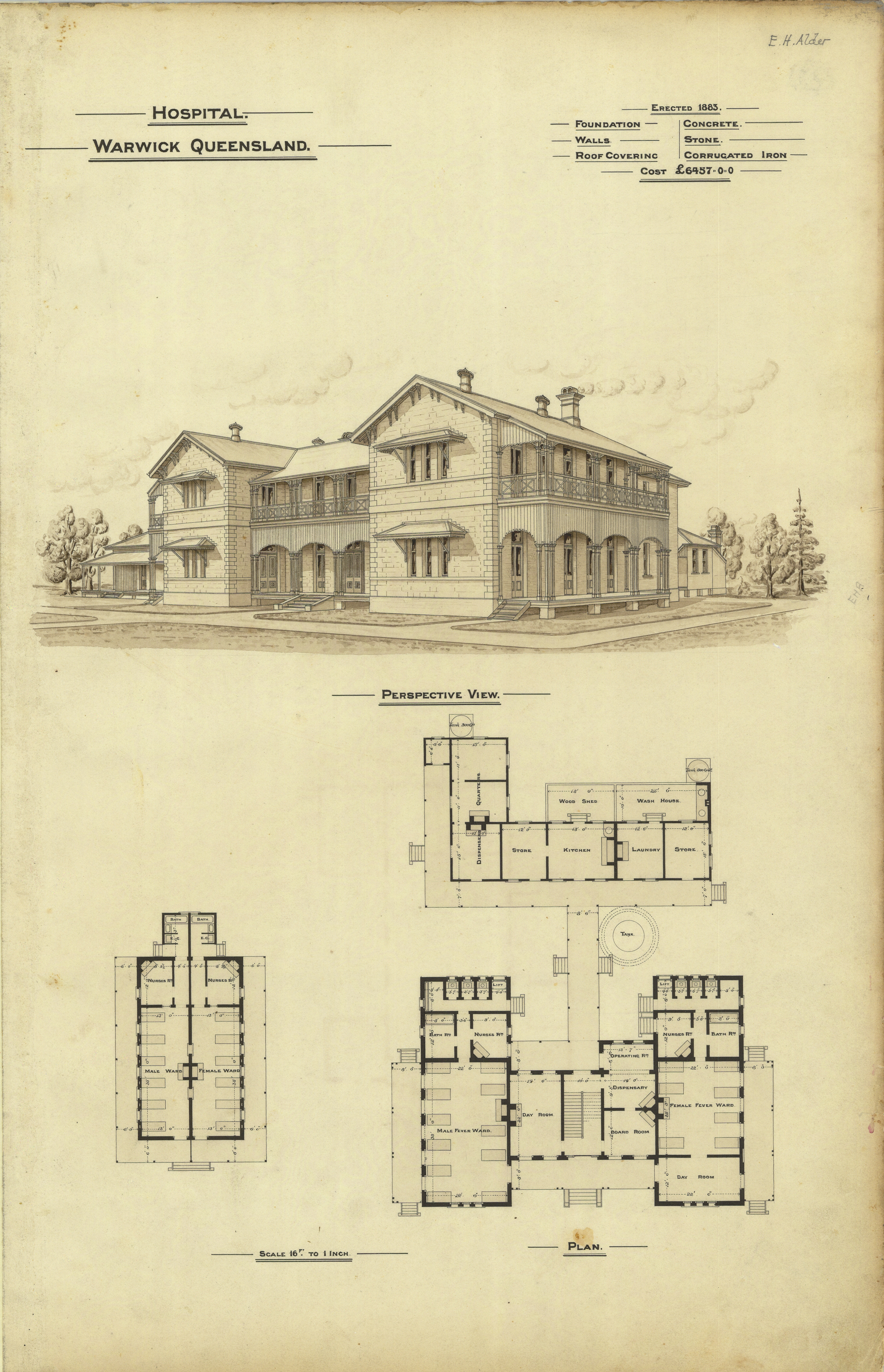
Architectural plans of the "new" hospital in Locke Street, 1888

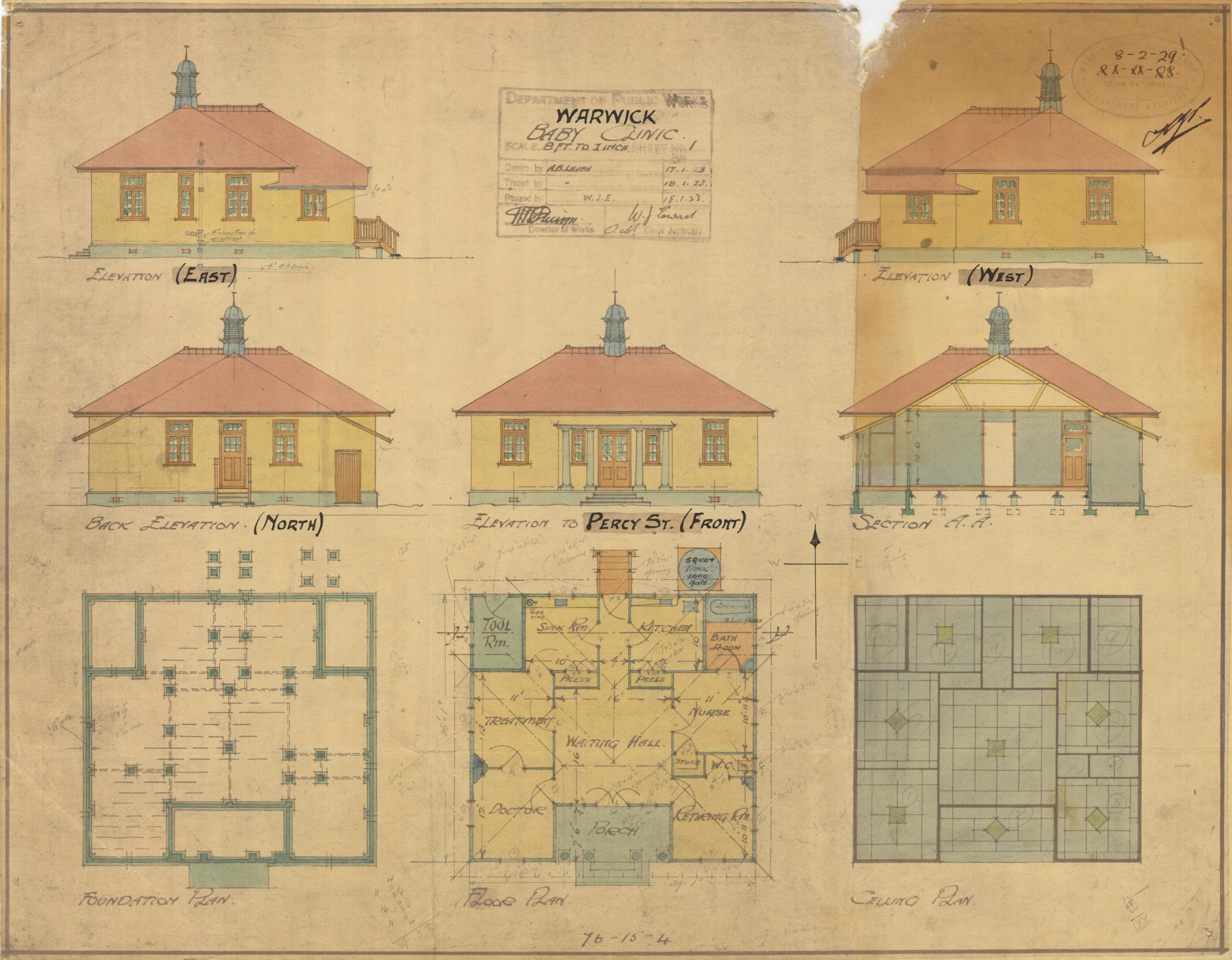
Architectural plan of the Warwick Baby Clinic, 1923

The Gidhabal (also known as Githabal, Gidabal, Kitabal) language region includes the landscape within the local government boundaries of the Southern Downs Regional Council, particularly Warwick, Killarney and Woodenbong extending into New South Wales. The Gidhabal people referred to the area of Warwick as Gooragooby.

The Warwick Green Belt, on the banks of the Condamine River, features a sculpture of Tiddalik the mythical frog that drank all of the fresh water in a renowned Aboriginal Dreamtime story.

Patrick Leslie and his two brothers originally settled in the area as squatters, naming their run Canning Downs. In 1847 the NSW government asked Leslie to select a site on his station for a township, which was to be called 'Cannington,' although the name 'Warwick' was eventually settled on. Land sales were held in 1850, and the first allotment was bought by Leslie.

Warwick East State School opened on 4 November 1850. It is the oldest state primary school still operating in Queensland and celebrated its 175th anniversary in November 2025.

In 1851, the first Presbyterian services were held in Warwick. Land was granted to build a Presbyterian church in 1857 and a slab church was built in 1858.

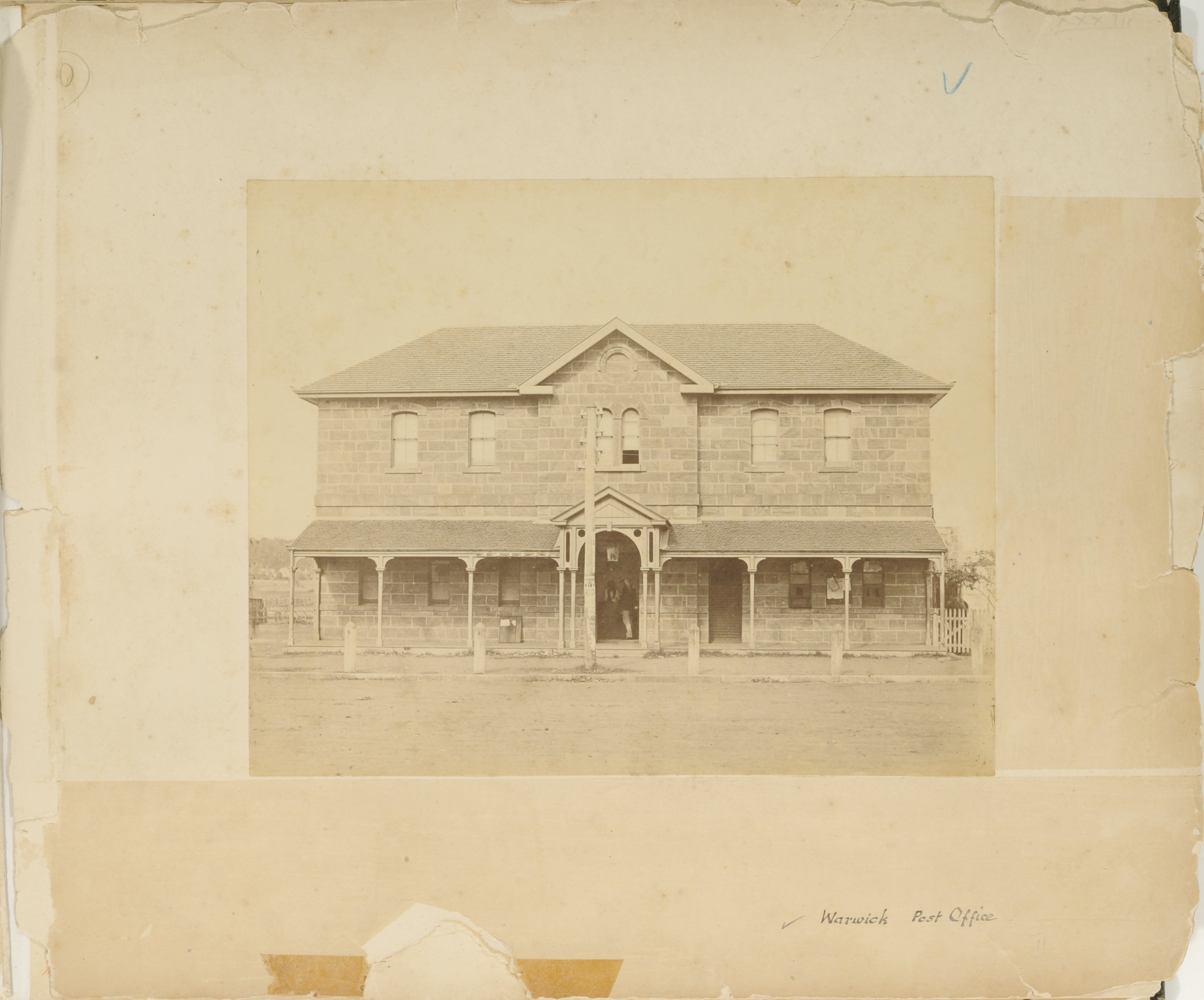
Warwick Post Office and Telegraph Office, Queensland circa 1876

The telegraph to Brisbane was operating by 1861.

Warwick Central State School opened on 26 July 1865.

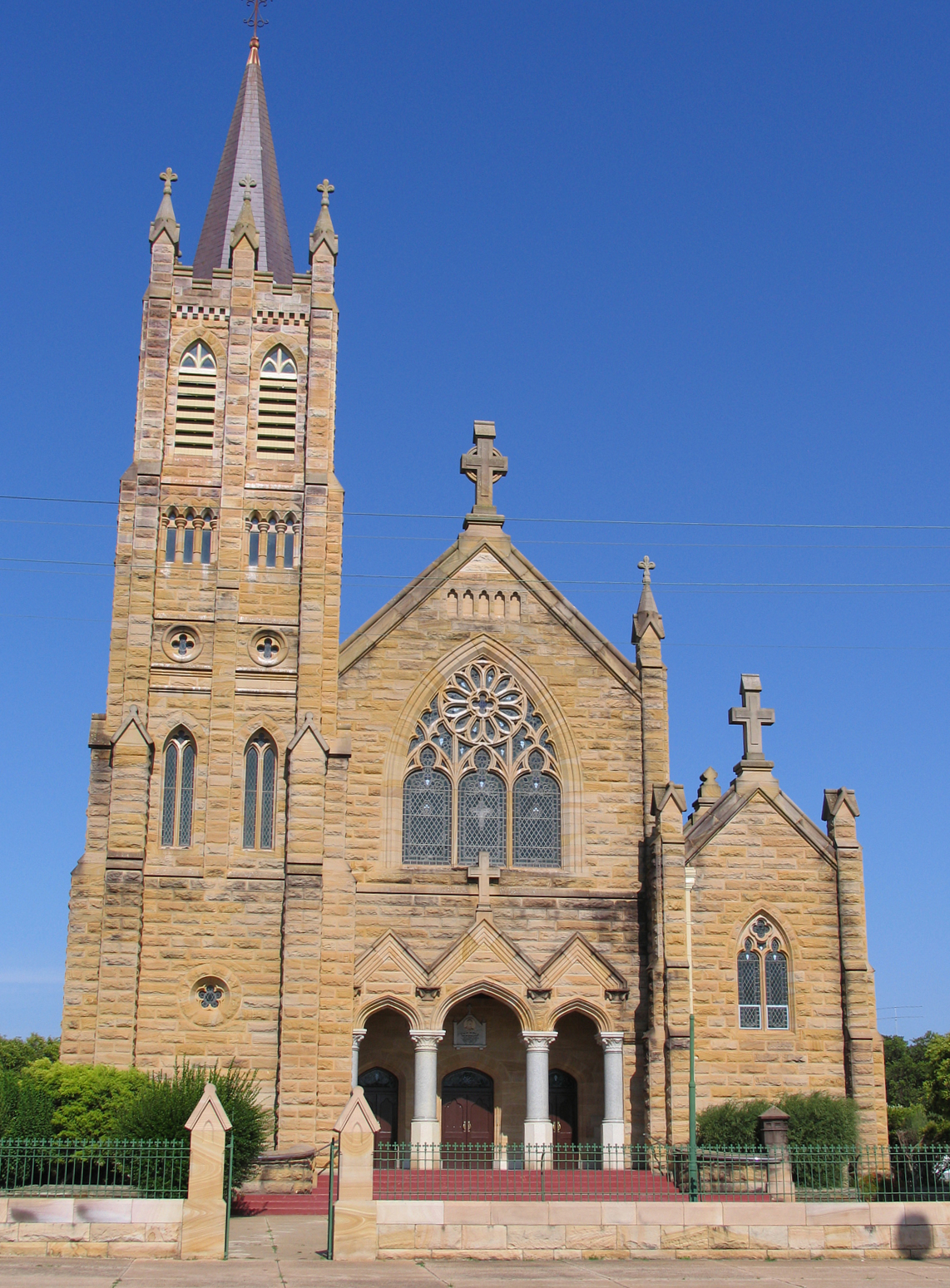
Second St Mary's Roman Catholic Church, Warwick

Miss O'Mara opened a school on 27 January 1867 in the Oddfellows Hall.

The 1870s were boom years for this new town. A new Post and Telegraph Office and Lands Office were built in Albion Street in 1870 and 1875. In 1871 the Southern railway line reached Warwick, a brewery was built in 1873, then a cooperative flour mill and brickworks were completed during 1874.

On 29 October 1874, the Sisters of Mercy took over Miss O'Mara's school at the Oddfellows Hall renaming it St Mary's School.

Warwick was the seat of a series of local government areas, the Borough of Warwick from 1861, Town of Warwick from 1903, City of Warwick from 1936, Shire of Warwick from 1994, and Southern Downs Region from 2008.

In 1877, 25,000 acres (10,000 ha) of land was resumed from the Canning Downs pastoral run to establish smaller farms. The land was offered for selection on 19 April 1877.

In 1878, the Queensland Government raised a loan of £5,000 to build a new hospital in Warwick. However, it was not until September 1880 after considerable local agitation that the government called for tenders to build the hospital, resulting in a contract awarded to A.W. Doorey to build the hospital. However, by February 1881, tenders were being called for again, and in April 1881 the Queensland Government announced the hospital would not proceed. In June 1881, the government indicated that they would proceed if the local financial subscriptions to the hospital were increased. Tenders were called again in February 1882 resulting in a contract with Messrs Wallace and Gibson in March 1882. Finally on Thursday 19 June 1884, the patients were moved from the old hospital to the new hospital in Locke Street.

In 1893, the Sisters of Mercy relocated their convent and St Mary's School to the newly constructed Our Lady of the Assumption Convent in Locke Street.

The T J Byrnes Monument (a statue of the 12th Queensland Premier Thomas Joseph Byrnes) was built on the corner of Palmerin and Grafton Streets. The monument was built from 1901 to 1902 and was officially unveiled on Saturday 13 December 1902 by the Governor of Queensland, Sir Herbert Chermside. The unveiling of the monument was an important occasion for Warwick.

In 1912, a Baptist church opened in Warwick. The building had been completed by August 1912.

Warwick State High School opened on 1 February 1912. It is one of the oldest state secondary schools in Queensland.

St Mary's School also expanded, creating a secondary school called Assumption College in 1912, and in 1914 enlarging the convent to accommodate the growing secondary school.

Lyndhurst State School opened in January 1913, but was quickly renamed Mount Gordon State School. It closed in 1985. The school was located on a 5-acre (2.0 ha) site at 294-304 Wood Street (corner of Parker Street, 28.2144°S 151.9963°E).

On 29 November 1917, the Warwick Incident occurred, which would lead to the formation of the Australian Commonwealth Police with the first commissioner for Commonwealth Police appointed eight days later. As Prime Minister William Morris Hughes was addressing a crowd at the Warwick railway station, a man in the crowd threw an egg dislodging the Prime Minister's hat. Hughes ordered his arrest but the Queensland State policeman present refused to carry out the orders saying that Hughes had no authority over him.

In February 1918, the Church of England High School for Girls opened with over 40 students. The school was operated by the Sisters of the Sacred Advent and the first headmistress was Miss Margaret Brown.

In February 1918, the Presbyterian Girls College (PGC) opened in an existing house "Glenbrae" on over five acres in Locke Street, as a boarding and day school with 53 girls under headmistress Miss Constance Mackness (who retired in 1949, the longest serving headmistress of the school). The school was established by local families who did not want to have to send their daughters to Toowoomba for a Presbyterian education.

In 1918, to meet the need for Presbyterian education for boys, the Scots College opened as a Presbyterian boarding and day for boys in an existing house "Arranmore" on the banks of the Condamine River under headmaster James Logan Briggs.

The Warwick War Memorial was built in 1923 and the memorial gates were built in 1924.

Slade School opened on 30 January 1926 in the house "Eastmont" (now known as "Slade House") on the ridge on the northern side of the Condamine River. The school was operated by the Bush Brotherhood. In 1977 it merged with St Catherine's Anglican School (a school for girls operated by the Sisters of the Sacred Advent). The school closed in 1997. In 2000 the site was purchased by the Anglican Church Grammar School (based in Brisbane), becoming their Slade Campus. However they decided to close the campus in 2005 saying it was not economically viable. In 2007 the site was purchased by the local council. In 2013 the site was purchased by the Warwick Christian College which commenced operations in 2014.

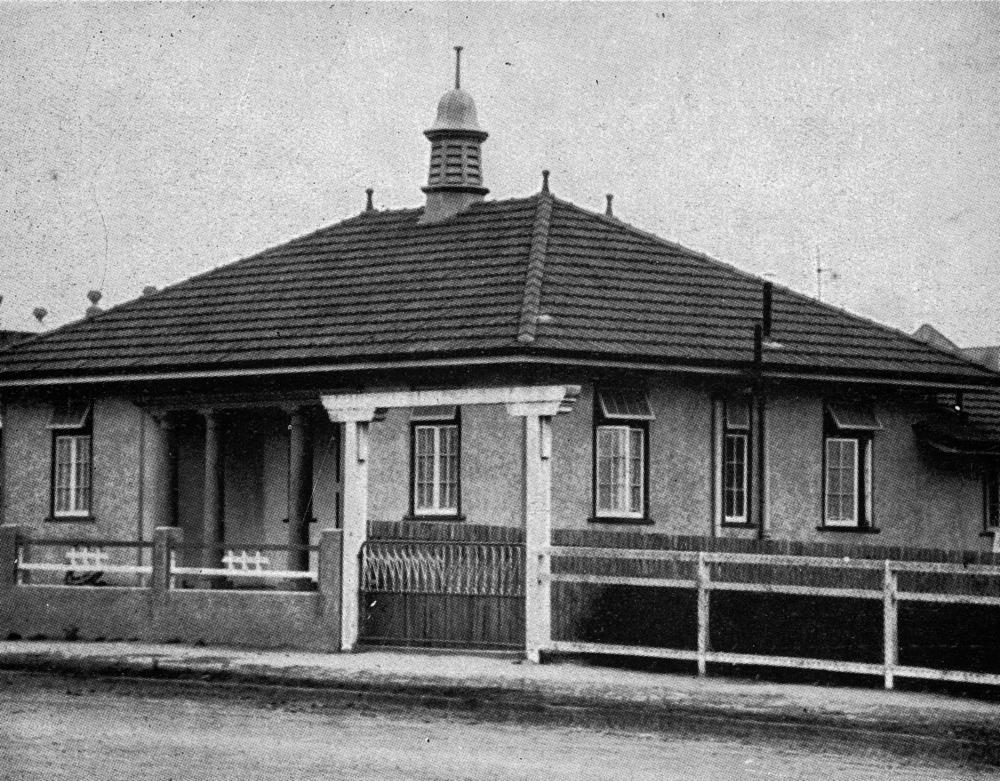
Warwick Baby Clinic, 1932

Although the Queensland Government had architectural plans for a Baby Clinic in Warwick from at least 1923, it was not until Friday 21 February 1930 that the Warwick Baby Clinic was officially opened by Home Secretary J.C. Peterson. The building cost about £2,000 and was built on land donated by the Warwick ambulance brigade. The purpose of baby clinics was to prevent disease in early childhood and the Warwick Baby Clinic was the 15th built in Queensland.

During World War II, the 2/12th Army General Hospital took over the Scots College buildings and grounds in Oxenham Street, with the school relocating to Kingswood and Toolburra.

The Warwick Polocrosse Club was established in 1953.

Warwick West State School opened on 31 January 1956.

Glennie Heights State School opened on 25 January 1960.

The current Warwick Public Library opened in 1964 with a major refurbishment in 1999.

St John's Anglican Church at Thane closed circa 1968. The church was relocated to the Mile End Park, 177 Pratten Street in west Warwick where it continues to operate as St John's Anglican Church.

In 1970, the Presbyterian Girls College and The Scots College merged into a co-educational school called Scots PGC College.

On 5 February 1981, The School of Total Education was established in Warwick by Vijayadev Yogendra (1930–2005). Yogendra was a yoga teacher and educationalist, the son of Shri Yogendra (who in 1918 founded the Yoga Institute in India). The school aimed to develop children through spiritual and emotional growth to additional to physical and intellectual development.

St Mary's School opened its Upper Campus in 2002.

In 2007, Warwick Christian College was established by the Christian Community Ministries.

== Demographics ==
In the 2016 census, the locality of Warwick had a population of 12,222 people.

In the 2021 census, the locality of Warwick had a population of 12,294 people.

== Facilities ==
The Southern Downs Regional Council operates a public library in Warwick at 49 Albion Street.

The Condamine Valley branch of the Queensland Country Women's Association has its rooms at 76 Grafton Street.

Warwick Wesleyan Methodist Church is at 126 Wood Street (28.2187°S 152.0181°E). It is part of the Wesleyan Methodist Church of Australia.

== Education ==
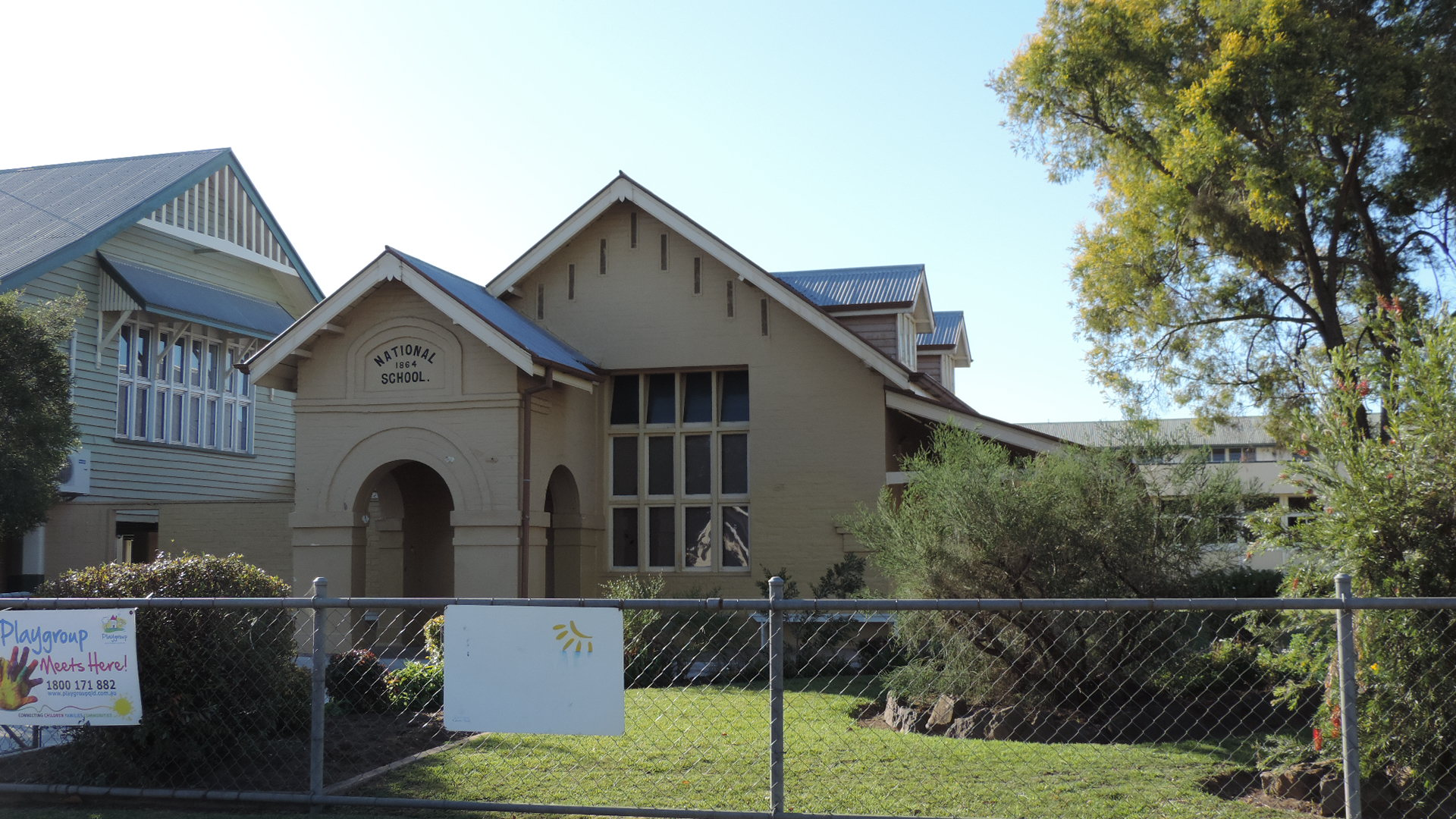
Warwick East State School, 2015

Warwick East State School is a government primary (Preparatory to Year 6) school at 45 Fitzroy Street (28.2147°S 152.0385°E). In 2017, the school had an enrolment of 217 students with 20 teachers (18 full-time equivalent) and 17 non-teaching staff (11 full-time equivalent). It includes a special education program.

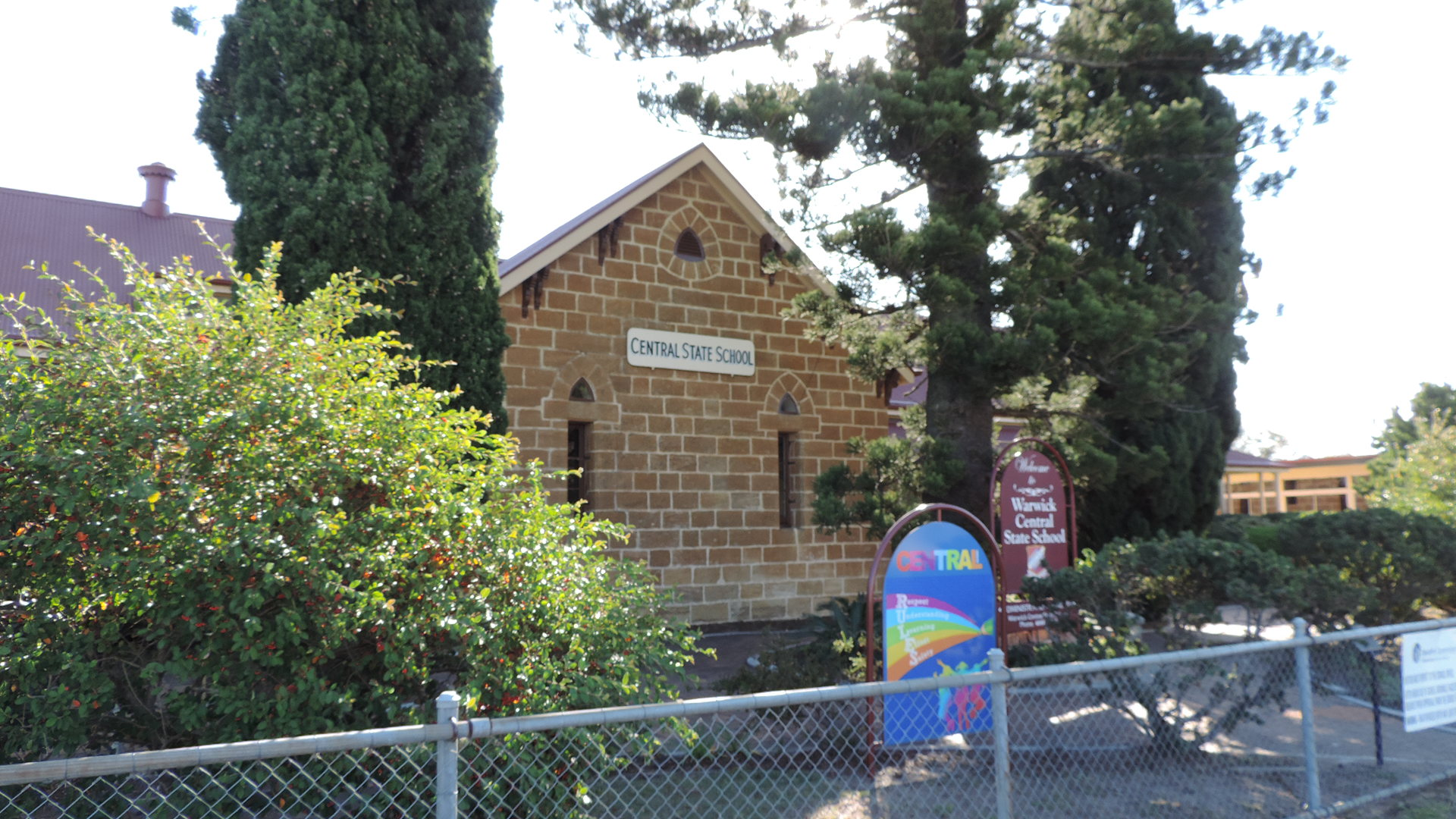
Warwick Central State School, 2015

Warwick Central State School is a government primary (Preparatory to Year 6) school on the north-western corner of Guy and Percy Streets (28.2177°S 152.0294°E). In 2017, the school had an enrolment of 281 students with 22 teachers (20 full-time equivalent) and 16 non-teaching staff (10 full-time equivalent). It includes a special education program.

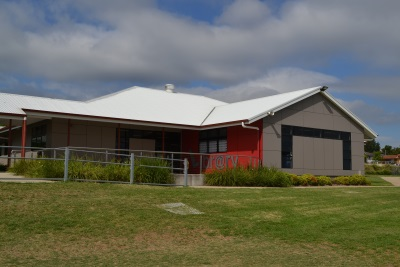
Library, Warwick West State School, 2025

Warwick West State School is a government primary (Early Childhood to Year 6) school at 17 George Street (28.2211°S 152.0148°E). In 2017, the school had an enrolment of 507 students with 47 teachers (40 full-time equivalent) and 33 non-teaching staff (21 full-time equivalent). It includes a special education program.

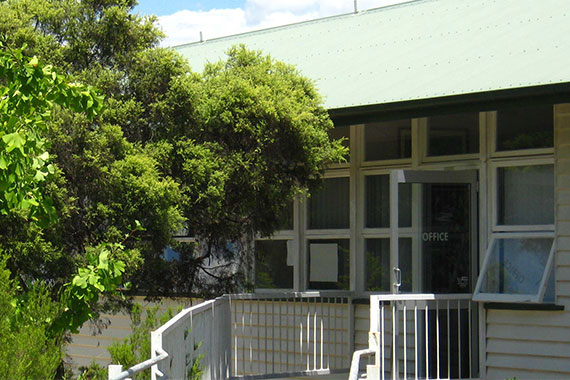
Glennie Heights State School, 2025

Glennie Heights State School is a government primary (Preparatory to Year 6) school at 5–12 Gillam Street (28.2010°S 152.0291°E). In 2017, the school had an enrolment of 177 students with 19 teachers (15 full-time equivalent) and 10 non-teaching staff (7 full-time equivalent). It includes a special education program.

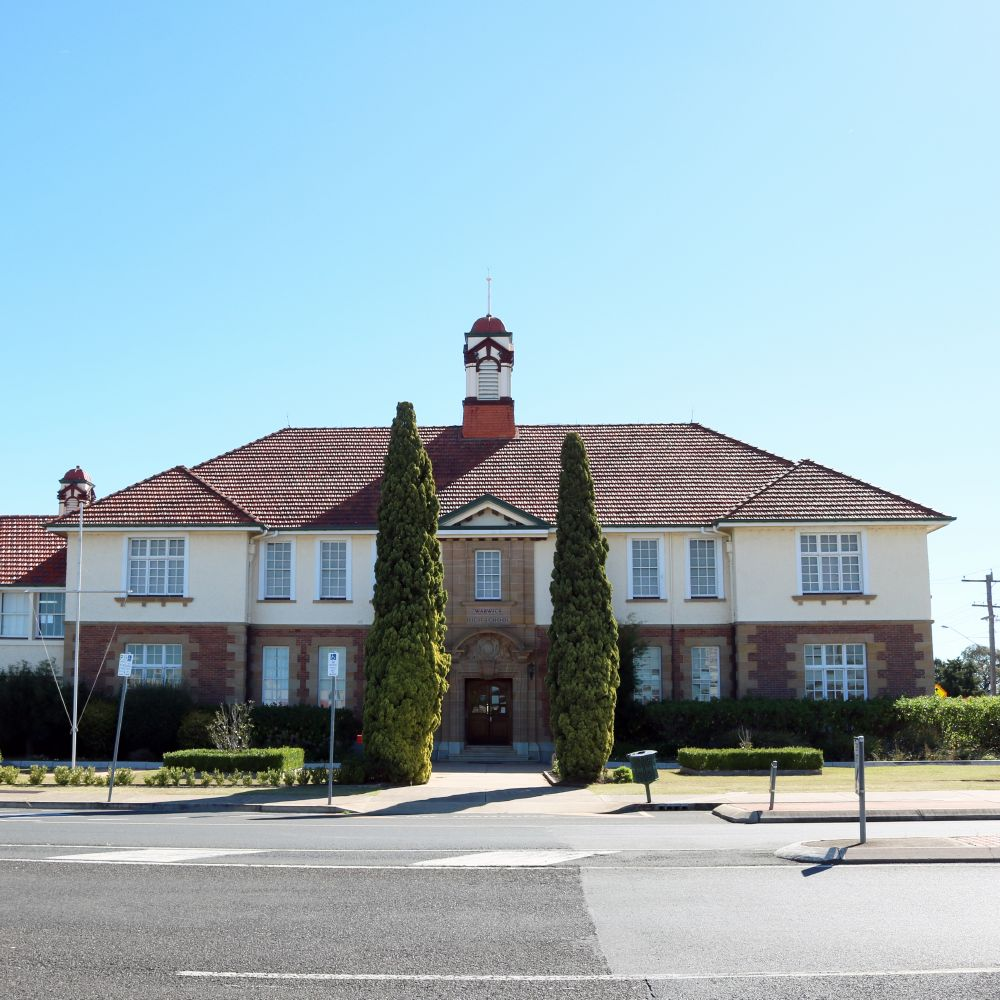
Warwick State High School, 2018

Warwick State High School is a government secondary (7–12) school at 15 Palmerin Street (28.2103°S 152.0335°E). In 2017, the school had an enrolment of 884 students with 88 teachers (80 full-time equivalent) and 53 non-teaching staff (38 full-time equivalent). It includes a special education program.

St Mary's School is a Catholic primary (Preparatory to Year 6) school with two campuses, one at 163 Palmerin Street (28.2190°S 152.0319°E) for the younger children and the other for older children at 175 Palmerin Street (28.2217°S 152.0314°E). In 2017, the school had a total enrolment of 324 students with 29 teachers (20 full-time equivalent) and 17 non-teaching staff (8 full-time equivalent).

Assumption College is a Catholic secondary (7–12) school at 6 Locke Street (28.2251°S 152.0279°E). In 2017, the school had an enrolment of 441 students with 36 teachers (34 full-time equivalent) and 20 non-teaching staff (15 full-time equivalent).

The Scots PGC College is a private primary and secondary (Preparatory to Year 12) at 60 Oxenham Street (28.2110°S 152.0469°E). In 2017, the school had an enrolment of 359 students with 37 teachers (36 full-time equivalent) and 35 non-teaching staff (24 full-time equivalent).

Warwick Christian College is a private primary and secondary (Preparatory to Year 11) school at 70 Horsman Road (28.2021°S 152.0329°E). In 2017, the school had an enrolment of 134 students with 13 teachers (10 full-time equivalent) and 16 non-teaching staff (8 full-time equivalent). The school has a special assistance campus at 62 Canningvale Road (28.2344°S 152.0492°E).

The School of Total Education is a private primary and secondary (Preparatory to Year 12) school at 2 Freestone Road (28.2039°S 152.0442°E). In 2017, the school had an enrolment of 109 students with 25 teachers (16 full-time equivalent) and 11 non-teaching staff (6 full-time equivalent).

== Communications ==
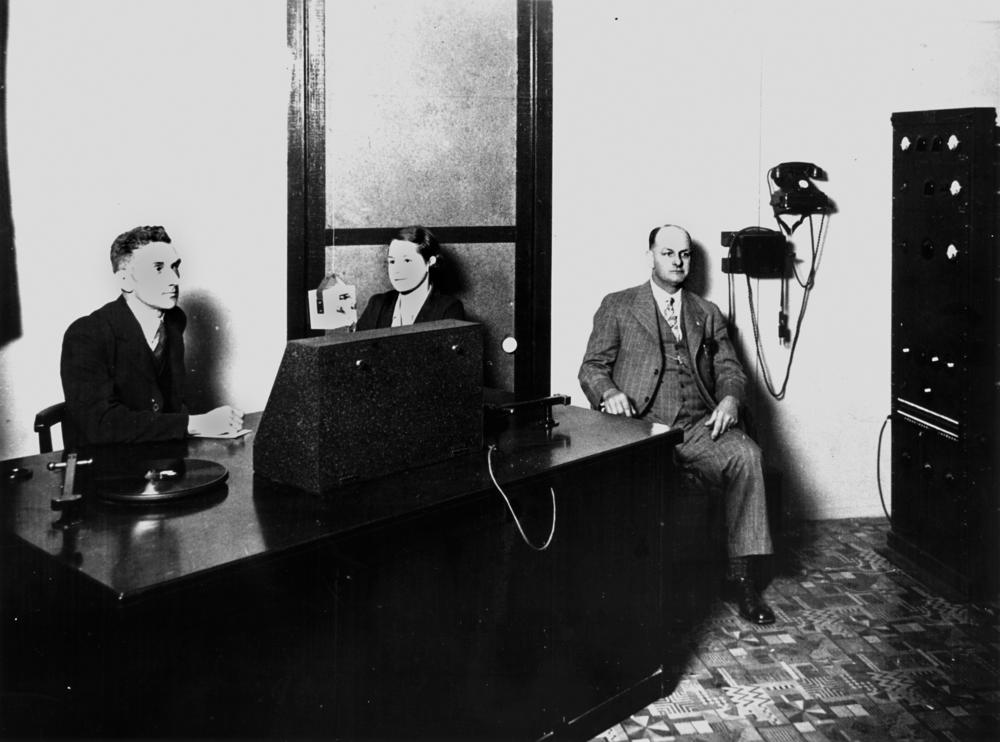
Presenter and guests at 4WK radio station, Warwick, circa 1940

Newspapers in Warwick include the Warwick Daily News, the Warwick and Southern Downs Weekly and the Southern Free Times. Former newspapers include the Warwick Argus which was published from 1879 to 1919, the Warwick Argus and Tenterfield Chronicle and the Warwick Examiner and Times. Radio station 4WK was established in May 1935. Its coverage was gradually extended to Toowoomba, Pittsworth, Millmerran, Clifton, Allora, Stanthorpe, Crows Nest, Highfields, Dalby, Oakey, Tara, Goondiwindi, Boonah, and Esk. It now broadcasts from Toowoomba.

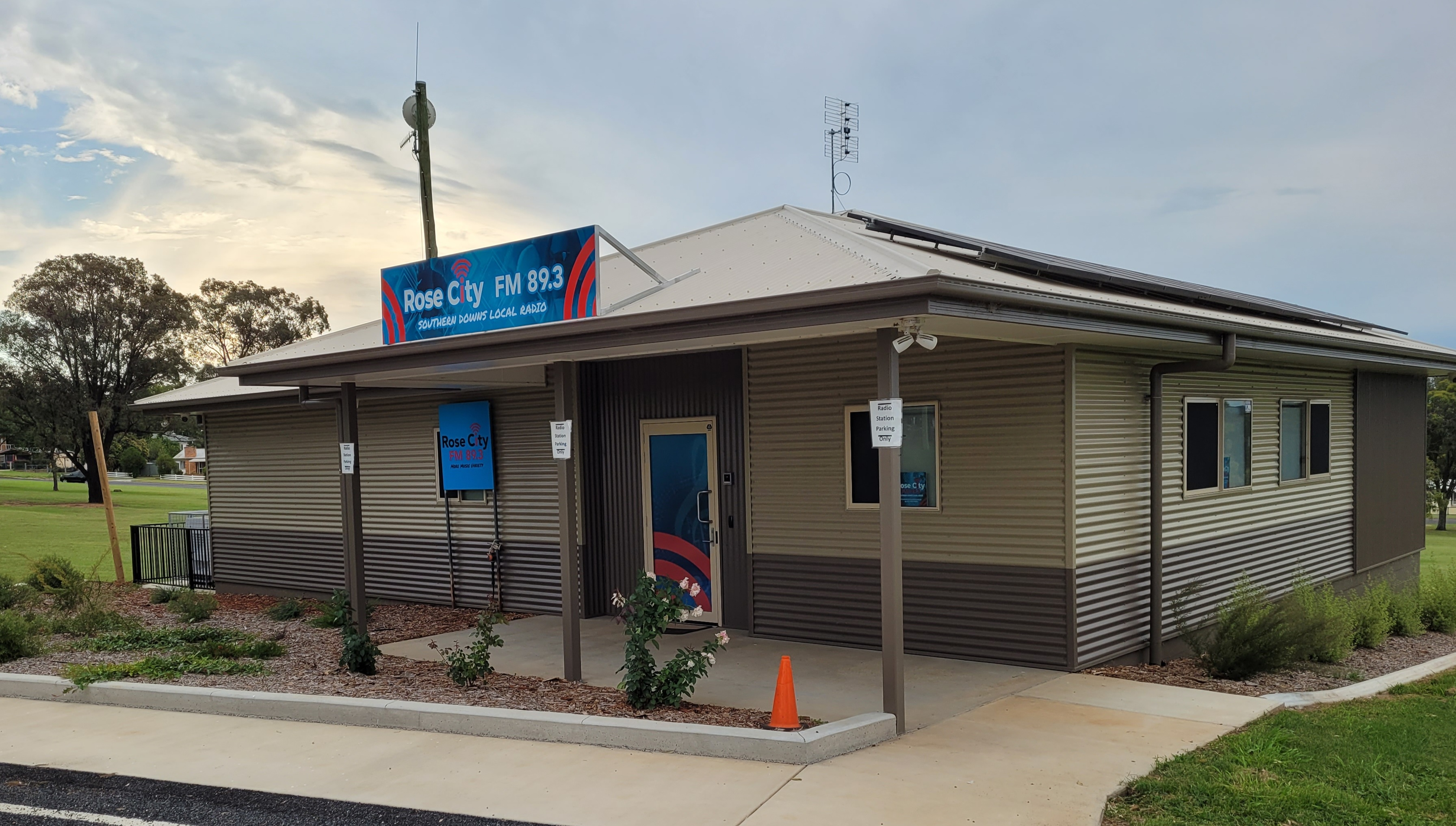
Rose City FM Studios, 2023

Warwick's Community Radio Station started transmissions in 1995 as 'Rainbow FM' and had the callsign 4CCC. The callsign was later changed to 4SDB by the ACMA and the name of the station was changed on 1 January 2019 to 'Rose City FM' to reflect its Warwick roots. It operates as a continuous service by a team of local volunteers. The operating body is incorporated as the "Warwick Community FM Radio Inc." It transmits on 89.3 MHz with an effective radiated power of 2000W (2000W ERP) from its antenna on the outskirts of Warwick; the program is broadcast from its studios at 41C Wallace Street, Victoria Park, Warwick. Rose City FM previously operated and transmitted from the building that had previously housed the Rosenthal Shire Council in Willi Street, Warwick from 1995 until 2022. The station has the support of the Southern Downs Regional Council and the Warwick community as well as many listeners online that listen through its Internet stream from its website.

== Sport ==
Warwick has a rugby union team which compete in the Darling Downs Rugby Union competition. The Warwick Cowboys, coached by one-time champion NRL coach Phil Economidis, play in the Toowoomba Rugby League.

Warwick has an Australian rules football club, the Warwick Redbacks competing in the AFL Darling Downs competition since 1999, the Redbacks won their first premiership in 2014.

Warwick has hosted a local Parkrun event since 2013.

The Warwick Polocrosse Club is based in neighbouring Morgan Park on the south-east edge of the town. It has seven playing fields and two practice fields with seating for up to 2,500 spectators.

== Attractions ==
- The Pringle Cottage Museum complex operated by the Warwick Historical Society
- Glengallan Homestead
- Warwick Art Gallery

== Heritage listings ==
- Warwick has many heritage-listed buildings, including those listed on:
  - the Commonwealth Heritage List
    - 98 Palmerin Street: Warwick Post Office
  - the Queensland Heritage Register
    - List of sites on the Queensland Heritage Register in Warwick

== Events ==
- Warwick Agricultural Show (March)
- FEI Eventing World Cup (May)
- Jumpers and Jazz in July Festival (July)
- The "Rose Bowl" Polocrosse Carnival (August)
- Warwick Trots (Harness Racing) (Darling Downs Harness Racing Club at Allman Park Racecourse) Father's Day, September
- Warwick Cup (Thoroughbred Horse Racing) (Warwick Turf Club at Allman Park Racecourse) October
- Warwick Rodeo (October)
- Rose Festival (October)

== Climate ==
Warwick experiences an altitude-influenced humid subtropical climate (Köppen: Cfa), with hot summers and mild, relatively dry winters with cold nights. Annual precipitation averages 662.4 millimetres (26.08 in), with a summer maximum. The town is slightly cooler and less humid than the proximate southeast Queensland coast due to its elevation; consequently, frost is present in winter. Record temperatures have ranged from 42.2 °C (108.0 °F) on 11 February 2017 to −7.7 °C (18.1 °F) on 8 July 1995. The climate bears similarities with Richmond, an inland suburb of Sydney.

Climate data for Warwick (28º12'36"S, 152º06'00"E, 475 m AMSL) (1994–2024)
Month	Jan	Feb	Mar	Apr	May	Jun	Jul	Aug	Sep	Oct	Nov	Dec	Year
Record high °C (°F)	40.9 (105.6)	42.2 (108.0)	37.4 (99.3)	33.3 (91.9)	29.7 (85.5)	27.3 (81.1)	26.0 (78.8)	33.0 (91.4)	36.6 (97.9)	38.5 (101.3)	39.8 (103.6)	40.8 (105.4)	42.2 (108.0)
Mean daily maximum °C (°F)	30.5 (86.9)	29.7 (85.5)	27.9 (82.2)	24.9 (76.8)	21.2 (70.2)	18.5 (65.3)	18.2 (64.8)	20.2 (68.4)	23.6 (74.5)	26.1 (79.0)	28.1 (82.6)	29.6 (85.3)	24.9 (76.8)
Mean daily minimum °C (°F)	17.2 (63.0)	17.1 (62.8)	15.4 (59.7)	11.5 (52.7)	7.0 (44.6)	4.7 (40.5)	3.1 (37.6)	3.4 (38.1)	7.1 (44.8)	10.7 (51.3)	13.7 (56.7)	15.9 (60.6)	10.6 (51.0)
Record low °C (°F)	9.6 (49.3)	7.9 (46.2)	2.9 (37.2)	−1.8 (28.8)	−4.9 (23.2)	−7.0 (19.4)	−7.7 (18.1)	−6.3 (20.7)	−3.8 (25.2)	0.9 (33.6)	1.9 (35.4)	6.5 (43.7)	−7.7 (18.1)
Average precipitation mm (inches)	81.6 (3.21)	66.7 (2.63)	81.5 (3.21)	29.2 (1.15)	44.6 (1.76)	33.7 (1.33)	24.3 (0.96)	26.6 (1.05)	34.5 (1.36)	69.9 (2.75)	78.4 (3.09)	102.5 (4.04)	662.4 (26.08)
Average precipitation days (≥ 1.0 mm)	6.1	5.8	5.6	3.4	4.1	3.7	3.6	2.9	3.9	5.8	5.9	6.8	57.6
Average afternoon relative humidity (%)	47	50	47	46	47	50	44	38	36	38	44	43	44
Average dew point °C (°F)	15.1 (59.2)	15.7 (60.3)	13.4 (56.1)	10.5 (50.9)	7.3 (45.1)	6.1 (43.0)	3.6 (38.5)	2.8 (37.0)	5.2 (41.4)	7.4 (45.3)	11.1 (52.0)	13.0 (55.4)	9.3 (48.7)
Mean monthly sunshine hours	251.1	214.7	217.0	237.0	226.3	186.0	226.3	251.1	255.0	251.1	246.0	251.1	2,812.7
Percentage possible sunshine	59	58	57	69	68	60	69	73	71	63	61	58	64
Source: Bureau of Meteorology

== Notable people ==
Notable people with a connection to Warwick include

- Francis Andersen, Australian scholar in the fields of biblical studies and Hebrew, born in Warwick
- Wayne Bennett, rugby league player and coach, raised in and played rugby league in Warwick
- Anna Bligh, 37th Premier of Queensland, born in Warwick
- Lee Bodimeade, hockey player, born in Warwick
- Dean Butler, hockey player, born in Warwick
- Thomas Joseph Byrnes, former Premier of Queensland, Member of the Legislative Assembly for Warwick
- Matt Campbell racing car driver
- Charles Chauvel, filmmaker, born in Warwick
- Cyril Clowes, lieutenant general, born in Warwick
- John Harward, scholar of ancient Greek and translator of Plato. Retired here in 1915.
- Delissa Kimmince, cricketer and Australian rules footballer, born and raised in Warwick
- Dion Leonard, ultramarathon runner and international bestselling author, grew up in Warwick
- Patrick Leslie, pioneer settler in Warwick
- Alan Marshall, cricket player, born in Warwick
- Mervyn Meggitt, anthropologist, born in Warwick
- Arthur Morgan, former Premier of Queensland, born in Warwick and Member of the Legislative Assembly for Warwick
- Paul Neville, politician, born in Warwick
- Adrienne Pickering, actress, born in Warwick
- Chris Pickering, musician, born and raised in Warwick
- Barry Reilly, rugby league player, born in Warwick
- Russell Skerman, Supreme Court Judge, attended Warwick High School
- Mark Steketee, Cricket player from Warwick
- Harry Sweeny, professional cyclist, born in Warwick
- Duncan Thompson, Australian rugby league footballer, coach and administrator, born in Warwick
- Elizabeth Catherine Usher AO (1911–1996), speech therapist, grew up in Warwick
- William Webb, judge, attended school in Warwick

== Sister cities ==
- Whakatāne, New Zealand, Since 1994
