= Desert phebalium =

Desert phebalium is a common name for several plants and may refer to:

- Phebalium bullatum, endemic to southern Australia
- Phebalium glandulosum, endemic to eastern Australia
