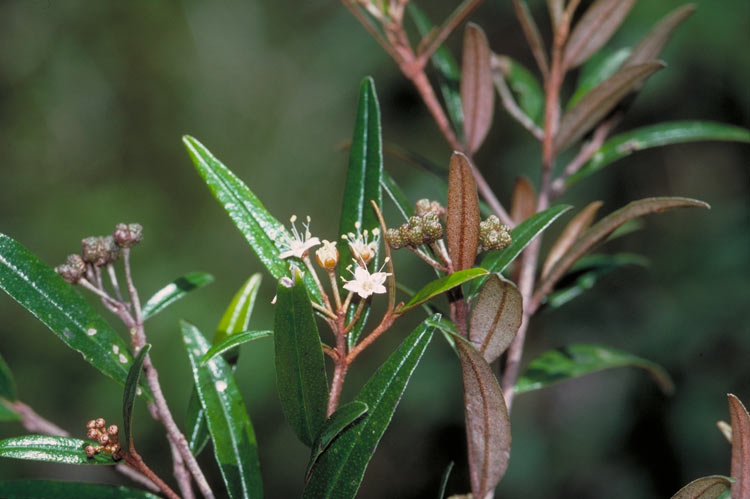

Scientific classification
- Kingdom: Plantae
- Clade: Tracheophytes
- Clade: Angiosperms
- Clade: Eudicots
- Clade: Rosids
- Order: Sapindales
- Family: Rutaceae
- Genus: Phebalium
- Species: P. longifolium

Binomial name
- Phebalium longifolium S.T.Blake

Synonyms
- Phebalium squamulosum subsp. longifolium (S.T.Blake) Paul G. Wilson

= Phebalium longifolium =

Species of shrub

Phebalium longifolium is a species of shrub that is endemic to far north Queensland. It is more or less covered with silvery to rust-coloured scales and has smooth branchlets, narrow elliptical to narrow lance-shaped leaves and cream-coloured flowers in umbels on the ends of branchlets. It grows in the boundary between forest and rainforest in tropical areas.

== Description ==
Phebalium longifolium is a shrub that typically grows to a height of 3 m (9.8 ft). It is more or less covered with silvery to rust-coloured scales except for the upper surface of the leaves and the front of the petals. The leaves are narrow elliptical to narrow lance-shaped with the narrower end towards the base, 15–80 mm (0.59–3.15 in) long and 2.5–10 mm (0.098–0.394 in) wide on a petiole 1.7–3 mm (0.067–0.118 in) long. The leaves are more or less glabrous and glossy green on the upper surface, densely covered with rust-coloured scales on the lower surface where there is a prominent mid-vein. The flowers are cream-coloured and arranged in small groups in umbels, each flower on a pedicel 5–12 mm (0.20–0.47 in) long. The calyx is top-shaped, 0.7–1.4 mm (0.028–0.055 in) long, 2.2–3 mm (0.087–0.118 in) wide and covered with warty glands and scales on the outside. The petals are elliptical, about 3 mm (0.12 in) long and densely covered with scales on the back. Flowering occurs from June to September.

== Taxonomy and naming ==
Phebalium longifolium was first formally described in 1959 by Stanley Thatcher Blake in Proceedings of the Royal Society of Queensland from specimens he collected near Wallaman Falls in 1951. In 1970, Paul G. Wilson reduced P. longifolium to P. squamulosum subsp. longifolium, but in 2003, Paul Irwin Forster reinstated P. longifolium in the journal Austrobaileya and the name is accepted by the Australian Plant Census.

== Distribution and habitat ==
This shrub grows on the edge of rainforest between the Herberton Range to the Paluma Range in tropical north Queensland.

== Conservation status ==
This phebalium is classified as "least concern" under the Australian Government Environment Protection and Biodiversity Conservation Act 1999.
