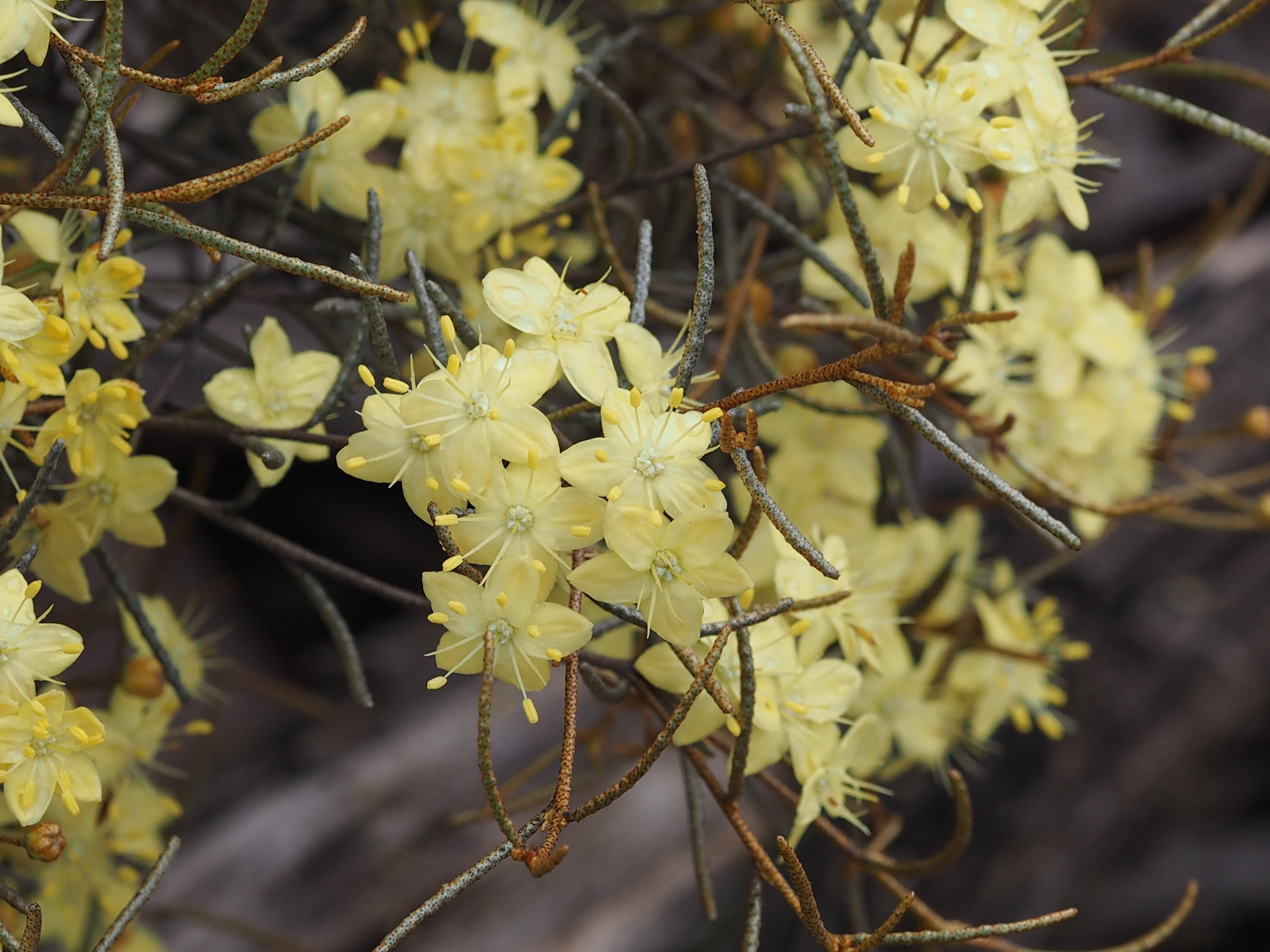

Scientific classification
- Kingdom: Plantae
- Clade: Tracheophytes
- Clade: Angiosperms
- Clade: Eudicots
- Clade: Rosids
- Order: Sapindales
- Family: Rutaceae
- Genus: Phebalium
- Species: P. laevigatum

Binomial name
- Phebalium laevigatum Paul G.Wilson

= Phebalium laevigatum =

Species of shrub

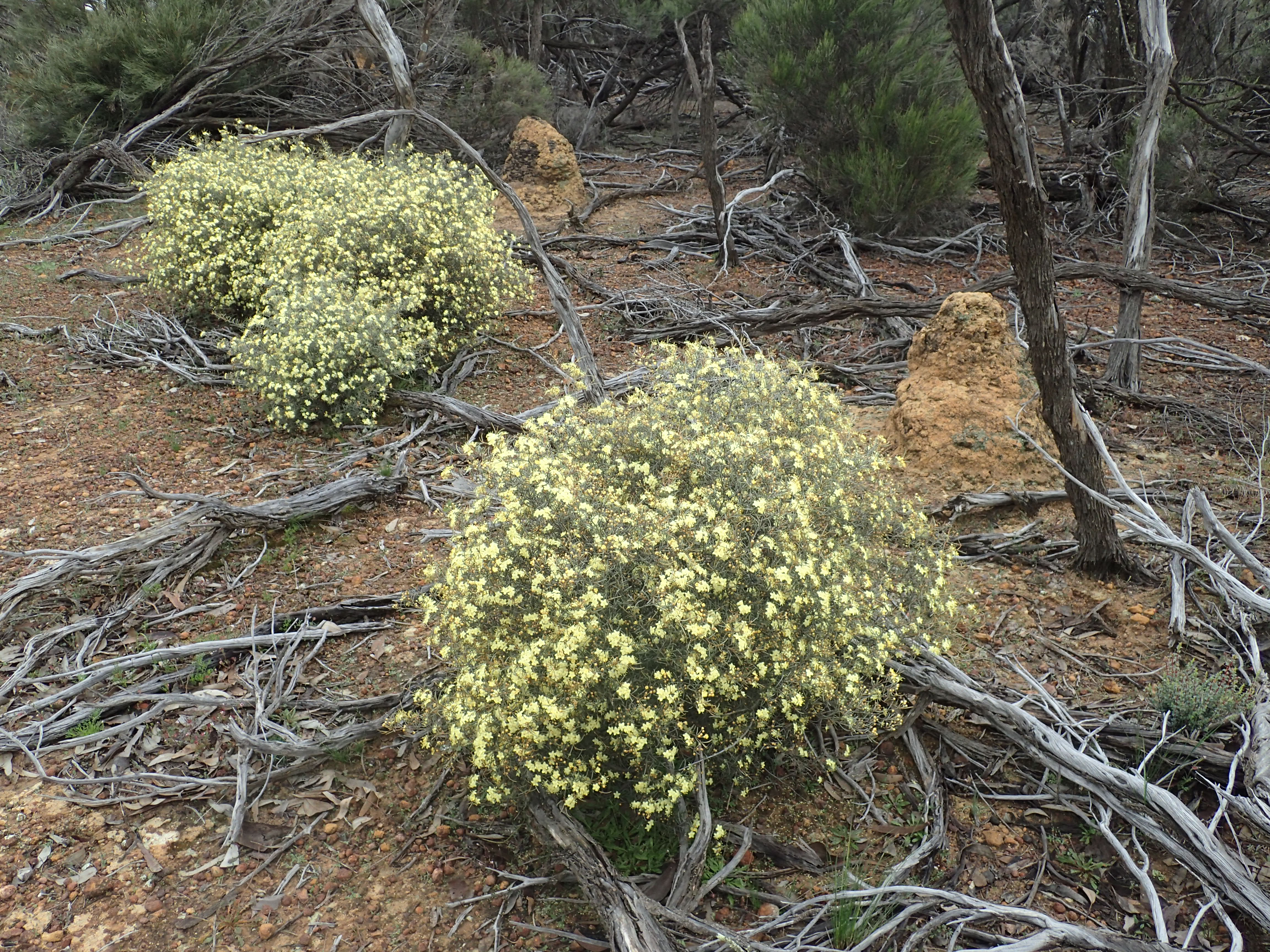
Habit in Corrigin Nature Reserve

Phebalium laevigatum is a species of erect, slender shrub that is endemic to Western Australia. It has glandular-warty branchlets, linear to narrow oblong leaves and white or yellow flowers arranged in umbels of about seven on the ends of branchlets.

== Description ==
Phebalium laevigatum is an erect, slender shrub that typically grows to a height of 0.35–1.2 m (1 ft 2 in – 3 ft 11 in). Its branchlets are glandular-warty and the leaves are linear to narrow oblong, mostly 12–15 mm (0.47–0.59 in) long and 1.5–2 mm (0.059–0.079 in) wide on a petiole about 2 mm (0.079 in) long, mostly glabrous on the upper surface and covered with silvery scales on the lower surface. The flowers are white or yellow and borne in umbels of about seven, each flower on a pedicel about 4 mm (0.16 in) long. The five sepals are about 1.5 mm (0.059 in) long, joined for half their length and covered with rust-coloured scales on the outside. The petals are broadly elliptical, 4–5 mm (0.16–0.20 in) long and 2.5–3.5 mm (0.098–0.138 in) wide, covered with rust-coloured scales on the outside. Flowering occurs from June to October.

== Taxonomy ==
Phebalium laevigatum was first formally described in 1998 by Paul G. Wilson in the journal Nuytsia from specimens collected by Nik Donner east of Merredin.

== Distribution and habitat ==
This phebalium grows in eucalypt scrub and is found between Merredin and the western edge of the Great Victoria Desert.

== Conservation status ==
This phebalium is classified as "not threatened" by the Government of Western Australia Department of Parks and Wildlife.
