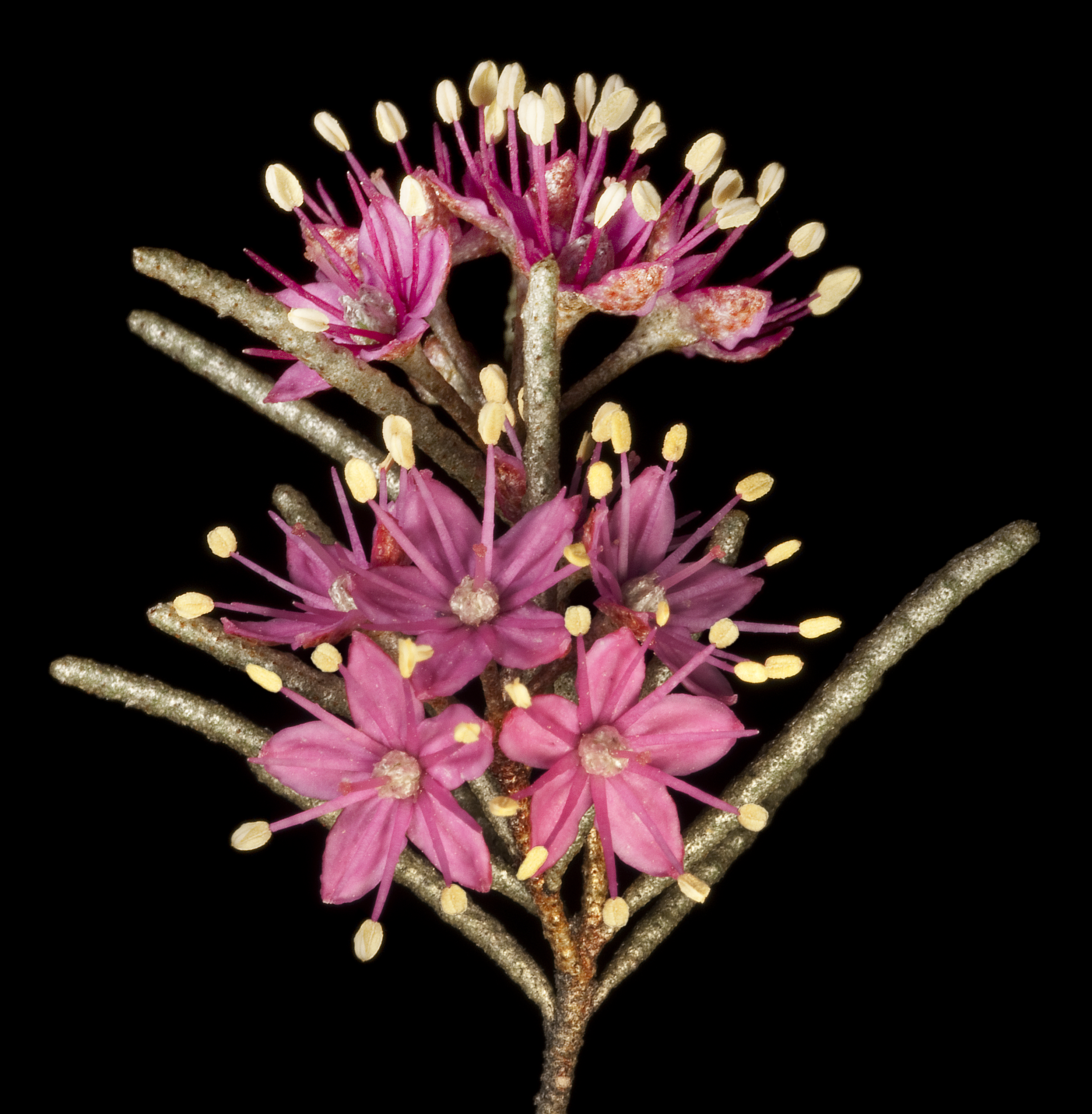
- Near Lake Moore, Western Australia

Scientific classification
- Kingdom: Plantae
- Clade: Tracheophytes
- Clade: Angiosperms
- Clade: Eudicots
- Clade: Rosids
- Order: Sapindales
- Family: Rutaceae
- Genus: Phebalium
- Species: P. canaliculatum

Binomial name
- Phebalium canaliculatum (F.Muell. & Tate) J.H.Willis

Synonyms
- Eriostemon canaliculatus F.Muell. & Tate

= Phebalium canaliculatum =

Species of shrub

Phebalium canaliculatum is a species of erect shrub that is endemic to the southwest of Western Australia. It is more or less covered with silvery and rust-coloured scales and has thin, cylindrical leaves and dark pink to pale mauve flowers in umbels on the ends of branches.

== Description ==
Phebalium canaliculatum is an erect shrub that typically grows to a height of 0.4–2 m (1 ft 4 in – 6 ft 7 in) and is more or less covered with silvery and rust-coloured scales. The leaves are cylindrical to slightly flattened, about 25 mm (0.98 in) long and 1.5 mm (0.059 in) wide on a very short petiole. The flowers are dark pink to pale mauve and arranged in sessile umbels on the ends of branchlets, each flower on a pedicel 4–7 mm (0.16–0.28 in) long. The sepals are about 1 mm (0.039 in) long and joined for about half their length, scaly on the outside but glabrous inside. The petals are elliptical, 4–5 mm (0.16–0.20 in) long and 2–3 mm (0.079–0.118 in) wide, covered with silvery scales on the outside. The filaments of the stamens are pale mauve with a yellow anther. Flowering occurs in May or from July to October.

== Taxonomy and naming ==
This species was first formally described in 1896 by Ferdinand von Mueller and Ralph Tate from specimens collected by James Drummond "towards Ularing" during Giles's third expedition. It was given the name Eriostemon canaliculatus and the description was published in the Transactions of the Royal Society of South Australia. In 1958, James Hamlyn Willis changed the name to Phebalium canaliculatum, publishing the name change in The Victorian Naturalist.

== Distribution and habitat ==
Phebalium canaliculatum grows on sandplains and hillslopes, sometimes on rock outcrops, in shrubland or mallee between Wongan Hills, Sandstone and Kalgoorlie.

== Conservation status ==
Phebalium canaliculatum is classified as "not threatened" by the Western Australian Government Department of Parks and Wildlife.
