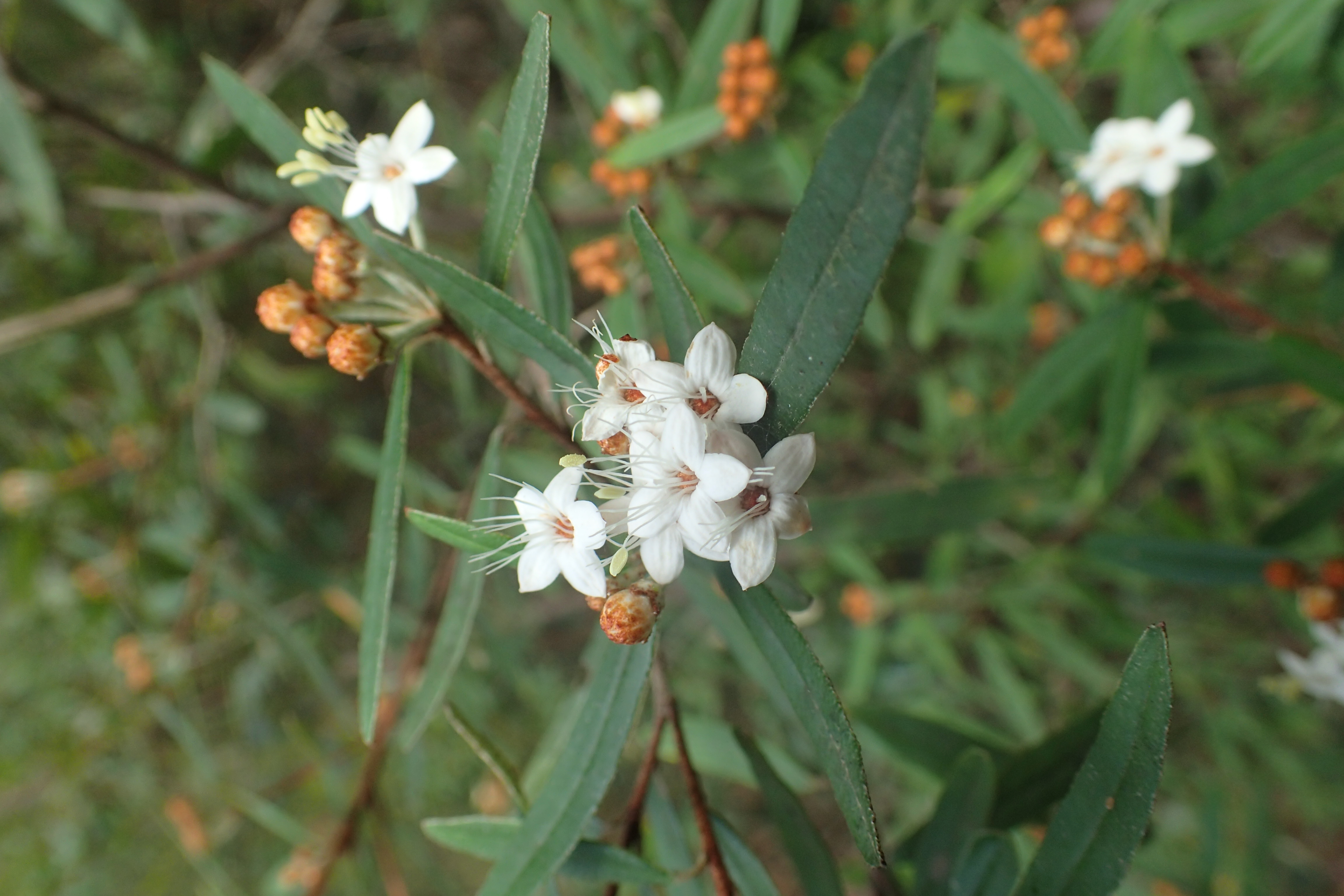
- In Sherwood Nature Reserve, near Glenreagh

Scientific classification
- Kingdom: Plantae
- Clade: Tracheophytes
- Clade: Angiosperms
- Clade: Eudicots
- Clade: Rosids
- Order: Sapindales
- Family: Rutaceae
- Genus: Phebalium
- Species: P. woombye

Binomial name
- Phebalium woombye (F.M.Bailey) Domin

Synonyms
- Asterolasia woombye F.M.Bailey; Asterolasia woombye var. intermedia F.M.Bailey; Asterolasia woombye var. parvifolia F.M.Bailey; Asterolasia woombye F.M.Bailey var. woombye

= Phebalium woombye =

Wallum phebalium

Species of shrub

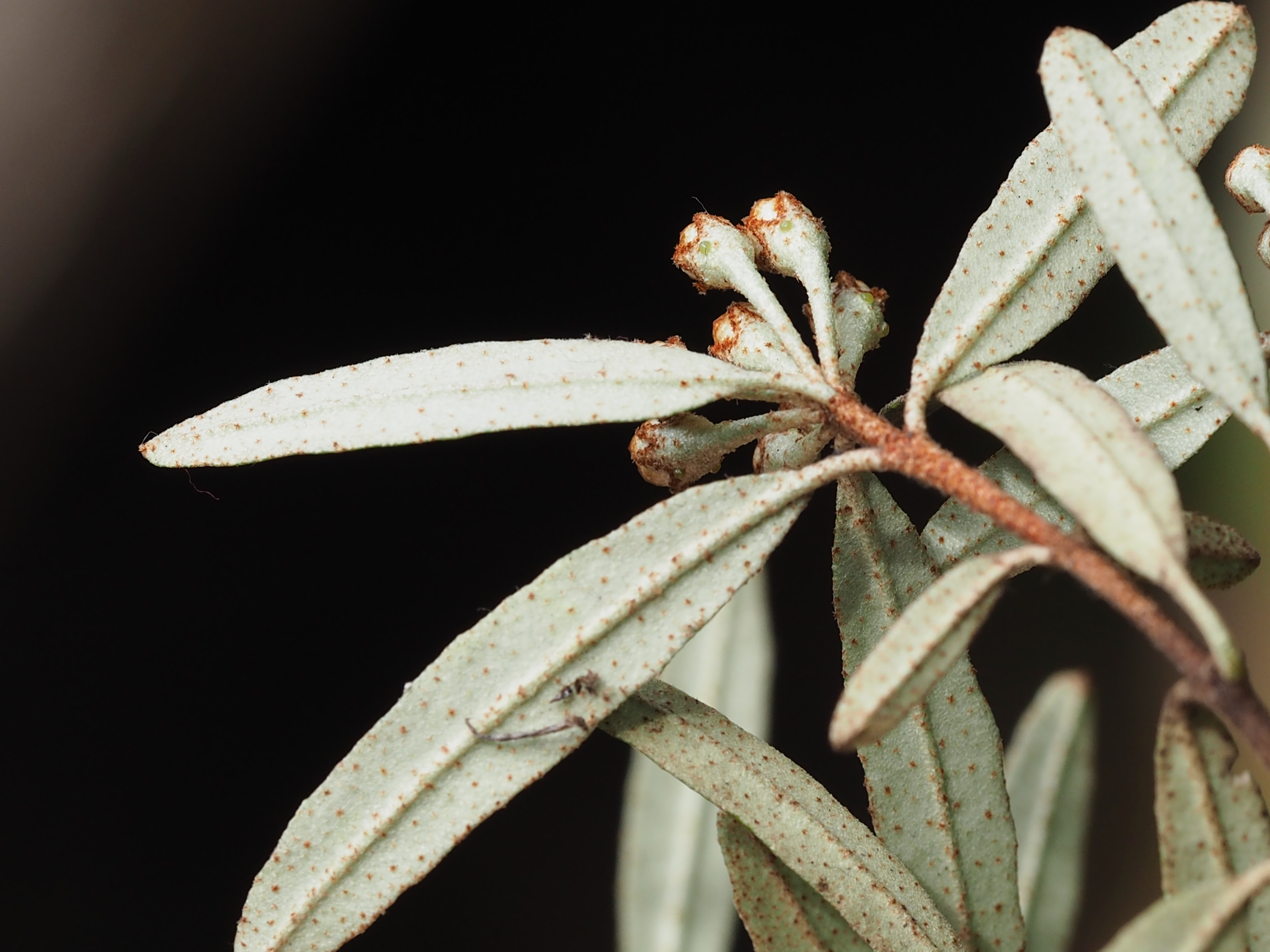
Lower surface of leaves

Phebalium woombye, commonly known as wallum phebalium, is a species of shrub that is endemic to eastern Australia. It has branchlets covered with scales and star-shaped hairs, elliptical leaves, and white to pink flowers arranged in umbels of four to ten flowers.

== Description ==
Phebalium woombye is a shrub that typically grows to a height of 2 m (6 ft 7 in) and has branchlets covered with scales and star-shaped hairs. The leaves are oblong to elliptical, 15–60 mm (0.59–2.36 in) long and 2–11 mm (0.079–0.433 in) wide on a short petiole. The upper surface of the leaves is flat and glabrous, the lower surface with a prominent mid-vein and covered with silvery scales. The flowers are arranged on the ends of branchlets in umbels of four to ten, each flower on a pedicel 4–15 mm (0.16–0.59 in) long. The calyx is top-shaped, about 3 mm (0.12 in) long with teeth about half that length, covered with silvery to rust-coloured scales inside and out. The petals are white to pink, egg-shaped with the narrower end towards the base, about 6 mm (0.24 in) long, 2.5 mm (0.098 in) wide and covered with rust-coloured scales on the back. Flowering occurs from July to August.

== Taxonomy and naming ==
This species was first formally described in 1898 by Frederick Manson Bailey who gave it the name Asterolasia woombye and published the description in the Queensland Agricultural Journal from specimens collected near Woombye. In 1913 Karel Domin changed the name to Phebalium woombye, publishing the change in the journal Repertorium Specierum Novarum Regni Vegetabilis.

== Distribution and habitat ==
Phebalium woombye grows in coastal sand dunes, and on sandstones, sometimes also on granite in the Gibraltar Range. It is distributed from south-east Queensland to as far south as Glenreagh in New South Wales.
