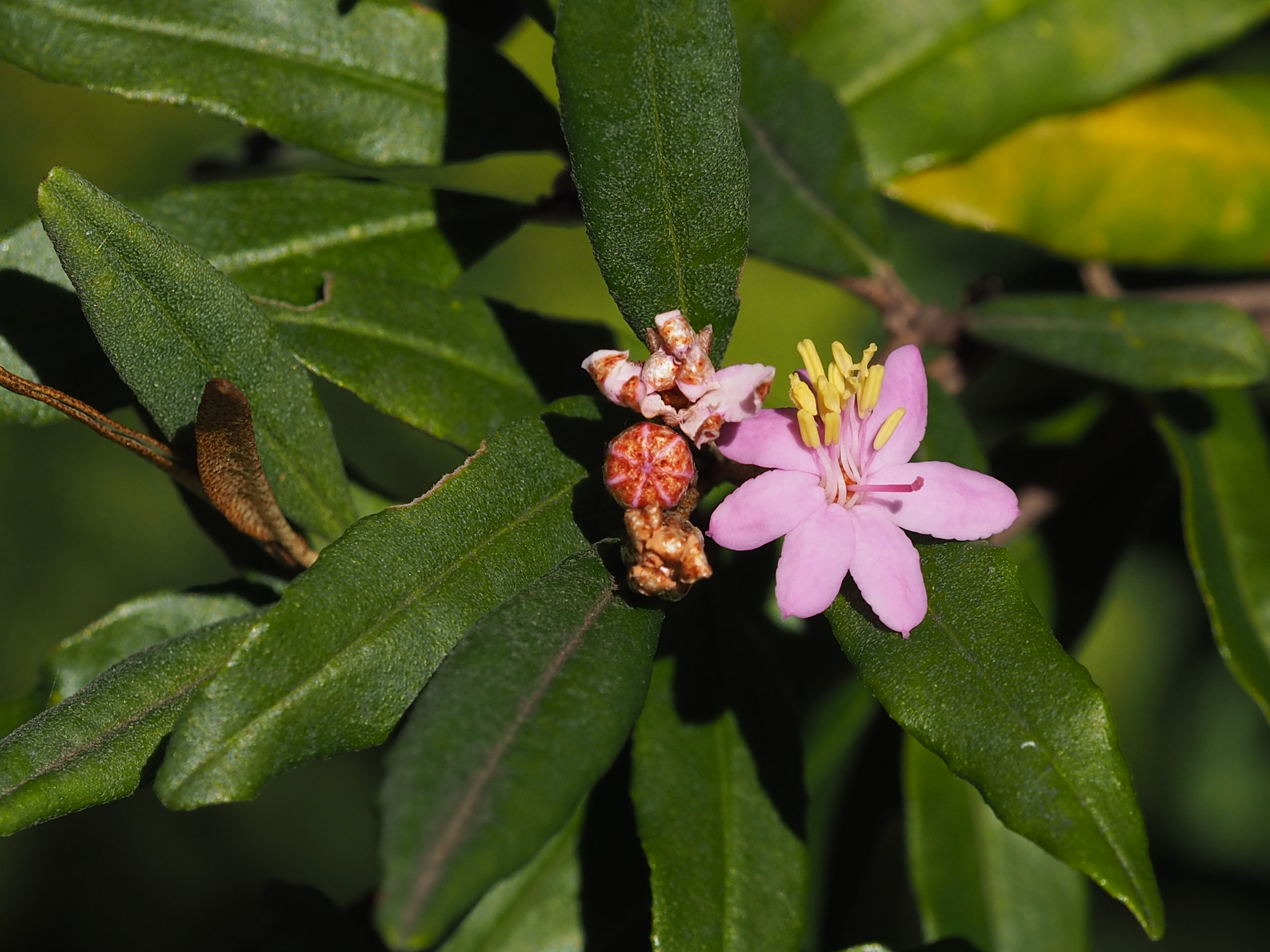

Conservation status
- Critically endangered (EPBC Act)

Scientific classification
- Kingdom: Plantae
- Clade: Tracheophytes
- Clade: Angiosperms
- Clade: Eudicots
- Clade: Rosids
- Order: Sapindales
- Family: Rutaceae
- Genus: Phebalium
- Species: P. speciosum

Binomial name
- Phebalium speciosum I.Telford

= Phebalium speciosum =

Species of shrub

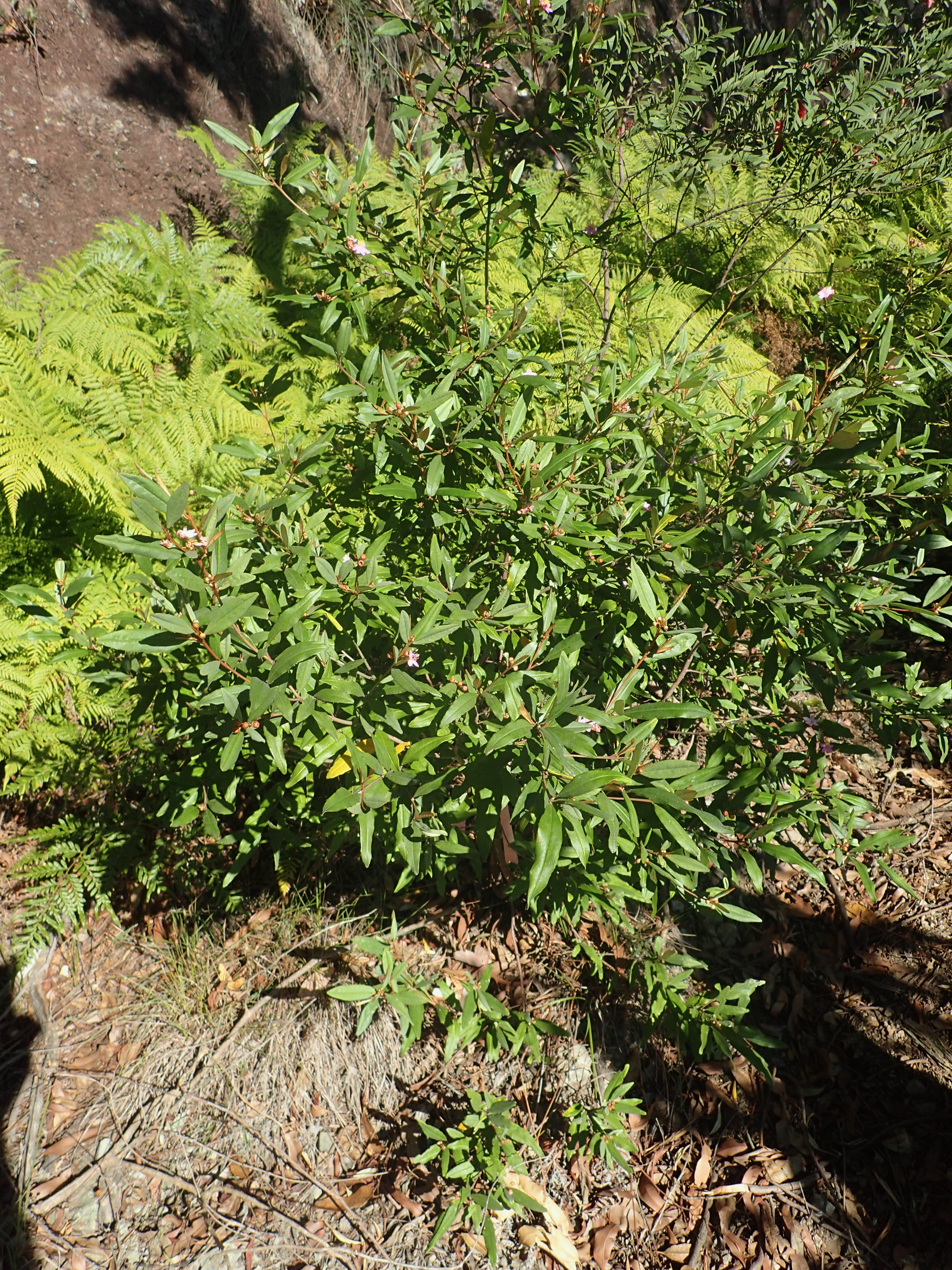
Habit

Phebalium speciosum is a species of shrub that is endemic to a restricted area of New South Wales. It has branchlets covered with rust-coloured scales, lance-shaped to narrow elliptical leaves covered with silvery and rust-coloured scales, and umbels of white to pale pink flowers with silvery or rust-coloured scales on the back of the petals.

== Description ==
Phebalium speciosum is a shrub that typically grows to a height of 3 m (9.8 ft) and has branchlets covered with rust-coloured scales. Its leaves are lance-shaped to narrow elliptical, 25–84 mm (0.98–3.31 in) long and 7.5–22 mm (0.30–0.87 in) wide on a petiole 3–5 mm (0.12–0.20 in) long. The upper surface of the leaves is dark green with silvery scales and the lower surface is covered with silvery and rust-coloured scales. The flowers are arranged in sessile umbels of four to eight flowers on the ends of branchlets, each flower on a scaly pedicel 7.5–10 mm (0.30–0.39 in) long. The sepals are joined at the base to form a cup-shaped calyx 4–5 mm (0.16–0.20 in) long and wide, covered with silvery or rust-coloured scales. The petals are white to pale pink, egg-shaped to elliptical, 8–10 mm (0.31–0.39 in) long and 3–5 mm (0.12–0.20 in) wide and scaly on the back. Flowering occurs from June to August or in February.

== Taxonomy and naming ==
Phebalium speciosum was first formally described in 2013 by Ian Telford in the journal Telopea from specimens collected near Urbenville in 2007.

== Distribution and habitat ==
This phebalium grows in open forest or heath at the base of volcanic outcrops and on top of cliffs. It is only known from two locations near Urbenville.

== Conservation status ==
This species is listed as "critically endangered" under the Australian Government Environment Protection and Biodiversity Conservation Act 1999 and the New South Wales Government Biodiversity Conservation Act 2016. The main threats to the species include habitat loss and weed invasion.
