= Phebalium elegans =

Scientific classification
- Kingdom: Plantae
- Clade: Tracheophytes
- Clade: Angiosperms
- Clade: Eudicots
- Clade: Rosids
- Order: Sapindales
- Family: Rutaceae
- Genus: Phebalium
- Species: P. elegans

Binomial name
- Phebalium elegans Paul G.Wilson

Species of shrub

Phebalium elegans is a species of spreading shrub that is endemic to Western Australia. It has warty branchlets, wedge-shaped leaves and two to five white flowers arranged in umbels on the ends of branchlets.

== Description ==
Phebalium elegans is a spreading shrub that typically grows to a height of 0.3–1.5 m (1 ft 0 in – 4 ft 11 in). It has warty branchlets covered with silvery scales. The leaves are wedge-shaped, covered with warty glands, about 5 mm (0.20 in) long and 2–3 mm (0.079–0.118 in) wide, glabrous on the upper surface and covered with silvery scales below. Two to five white flowers are arranged in umbels on the ends of branchlets, each flower on a silvery-scaly pedicel 5–10 mm (0.20–0.39 in) long. The calyx is about 1.5 mm (0.059 in) long, with silvery to reddish -brown scales on the outside. The petals are broadly elliptical, 4–5 mm (0.16–0.20 in) long and covered with silvery to rust-coloured scales on the back. Flowering occurs from July to September.

== Taxonomy and naming ==
Phebalium elegans was first formally described in 1998 by Paul Wilson in the journal Nuytsia from specimens collected in the Fraser Range east of Norseman by Kenneth Newbey in 1980.

== Distribution and habitat ==
Phebalium elegans grows on rocky hills from the Bremer Range to the Fraser Range.

== Conservation status ==
This phebalium is classified as "not threatened" by the Western Australian Government Department of Parks and Wildlife.
