= Phebalium brachycalyx =

Conservation status
- Priority Three — Poorly Known Taxa (DEC)

Scientific classification
- Kingdom: Plantae
- Clade: Tracheophytes
- Clade: Angiosperms
- Clade: Eudicots
- Clade: Rosids
- Order: Sapindales
- Family: Rutaceae
- Genus: Phebalium
- Species: P. brachycalyx

Binomial name
- Phebalium brachycalyx Paul G.Wilson

Synonyms
- Phebalium tuberculosum (F.Muell.) Benth.

Species of shrub

Phebalium brachycalyx is a species of shrub that is endemic to the southwest of Western Australia. It is more or less covered with silvery and rust-coloured scales, and has narrow oblong leaves with wavy-glandular edges, and white to pale yellow flowers in umbels on the ends of branches.

== Description ==
Phebalium brachycalyx is a shrub that typically grows to a height of 0.4–1.5 m (1 ft 4 in – 4 ft 11 in) and is more or less covered with silvery and rust-coloured scales. The leaves are narrow oblong, about 10–15 mm (0.39–0.59 in) long and about 1.5 mm (0.059 in) wide on a short petiole. The edge of the leaves are wavy-glandular and the mid-vein on the lower surface is warty. The flowers are white to pale yellow and arranged in umbels of three to six flowers, each flower on a thin pedicel 4–8 mm (0.16–0.31 in) long. The sepals are about 1 mm (0.039 in) long and joined for about half their length, scaly on the outside but glabrous inside. The petals are broadly elliptical, about 4 mm (0.16 in) long and 2 mm (0.079 in) wide, covered with silvery to rust-coloured scales on the outside. Flowering occurs from August to November.

== Taxonomy and naming ==
Phebalium brachycalyx was first formally described in 1998 by Paul Wilson in the journal Nuytsia from specimens collected at the south end of the Wongan Hills by Alex George.

== Distribution and habitat ==
Phebalium brachycalyx grows on laterite on hills between Dalwallinu and Kondinin.

== Conservation status ==
Phebalium brachycalyx is classified as "Priority Three" by the Government of Western Australia Department of Parks and Wildlife meaning that it is poorly known and known from only a few locations but is not under imminent threat.
