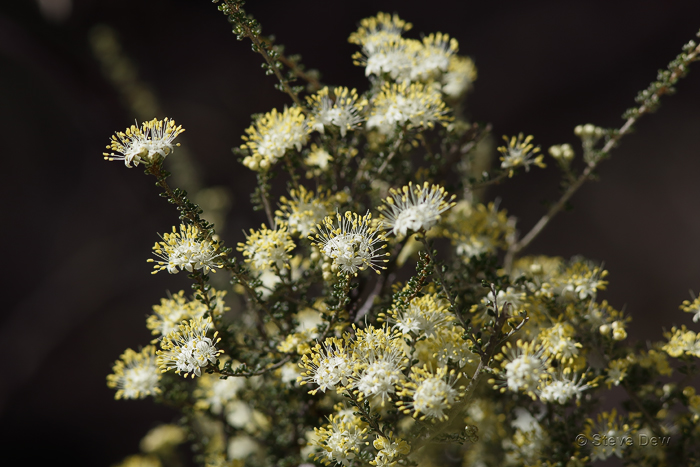
- Near Binya

Scientific classification
- Kingdom: Plantae
- Clade: Tracheophytes
- Clade: Angiosperms
- Clade: Eudicots
- Clade: Rosids
- Order: Sapindales
- Family: Rutaceae
- Genus: Phebalium
- Species: P. obcordatum

Binomial name
- Phebalium obcordatum Benth.

Synonyms
- Eriostemon mortoni F.Muell. orth. var.; Eriostemon mortonii F.Muell.

= Phebalium obcordatum =

Club-leaved phebalium

Species of shrub

Phebalium obcordatum, commonly known as the club-leaved phebalium, is a species of shrub that is endemic to New South Wales. It has smooth branchlets, small egg-shaped to heart-shaped leaves with the narrower end towards the base and small umbels of pale yellow flowers with silvery scales on the back of the petals.

== Description ==
Phebalium obcordatum is a shrub that typically grows to a height of 0.7–1.3 m (2 ft 4 in – 4 ft 3 in) and has smooth branchlets. Its leaves are egg-shaped to heart-shaped with the narrower end towards the base, 2–3.5 mm (0.079–0.138 in) long and 1.5–2.5 mm (0.059–0.098 in) wide. The upper surface of the leaves is warty and the lower surface densely covered with silvery scales. The flowers are pale yellow and arranged in sessile umbels on the ends of branchlets and short side branches, each flower on a pedicel 2–3 mm (0.079–0.118 in) long. The sepals are joined to form a hemispherical calyx about 0.5–1 mm (0.020–0.039 in) long and 1–2 mm (0.039–0.079 in) wide, covered with silvery or rust-coloured scales on the outside. The petals are elliptical, about 2.5 mm (0.098 in) long and 1.5 mm (0.059 in) wide and scaly on the back. Flowering occurs from late winter to early spring.

== Taxonomy and naming ==
Phebalium obcordatum was first formally described in 1863 by George Bentham in Flora Australiensis from specimens collected by Allan Cunningham.

== Distribution and habitat ==
Club-leaved phebalium grows in woodland in hilly areas in central New South Wales south from Trundle and Cobar.
