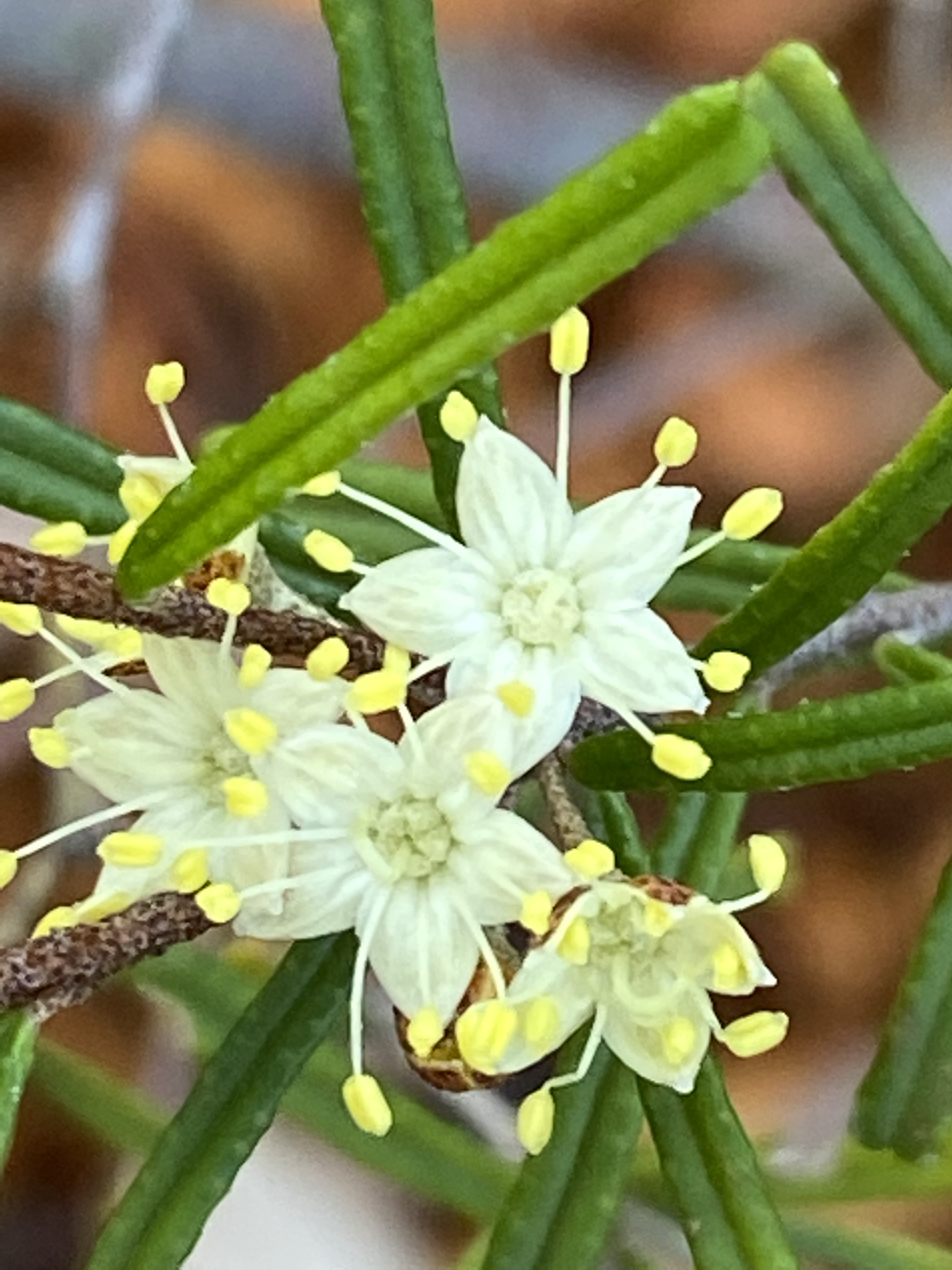
- In the ANBG

Conservation status
- Critically endangered (EPBC Act)

Scientific classification
- Kingdom: Plantae
- Clade: Tracheophytes
- Clade: Angiosperms
- Clade: Eudicots
- Clade: Rosids
- Order: Sapindales
- Family: Rutaceae
- Genus: Phebalium
- Species: P. daviesii

Binomial name
- Phebalium daviesii Hook.f.

= Phebalium daviesii =

St Helens wax flower

Species of shrub

Phebalium daviesii, commonly known as St Helens wax flower or Davies' wax flower, is a species of shrub that is endemic to a restricted area in Tasmania. It is more or less covered with silvery or rust-coloured scales and has narrow wedge-shaped leaves with a notched tip, and umbels of white to cream-coloured, five-petalled flowers.

== Description ==
Phebalium daviesii is a shrub that grows to a height of 1–3 m (3 ft 3 in – 9 ft 10 in) and is more or less covered with silvery or rust-coloured scales. The leaves are narrow wedge-shaped, up to 20 mm (0.79 in) long and 1–3 mm (0.039–0.118 in) wide with a notched tip, a short petiole and glabrous on the upper surface. The flowers are white to cream-coloured and arranged in sessile umbels on the ends of branchlets, each flower on a pedicel about 4 mm (0.16 in) long. The sepals are joined to form a hemispherical calyx 1–1.5 mm (0.039–0.059 in) long and 2 mm (0.079 in) wide with triangular lobes. The five petals are broadly elliptical, about 3 mm (0.12 in) long and 2 mm (0.079 in) wide. Flowering occurs from September to November.

== Taxonomy ==
Phebalium daviesii was first formally described in 1859 by Joseph Dalton Hooker and the description was published in The botany of the Antarctic voyage of H.M. Discovery ships Erebus and Terror. III. Flora Tasmaniae.

== Distribution and habitat ==
St Helens wax flower is only found in a small area along 4.5 km (2.8 mi) of the George River near St. Helens on Tasmania's north-east coast. It grows in Eucalyptus viminalis woodland with a heathy understorey.

== Conservation status ==
This phebalium is listed as "critically endangered" under the Australian Government Environment Protection and Biodiversity Conservation Act 1999 and a recovery plan has been prepared. It was assumed to be extinct, having not been collected since 1892, until it was rediscovered in 1990, although in 2001, only 23 mature individuals were recorded. The main threats to the species are its small population size, damage caused by flooding and susceptibility to Phytophthora cinnamomi fungus.

== Use in horticulture ==
St Helens wax flower can be readily grown from cuttings and has been propagated in several plant nurseries.

== Culture ==
In 2001, each Australian state nominated a native flower as a floral emblem to celebrate the centenary of the Federation of Australia. The St Helens wax flower was chosen as the Tasmanian Federation Flower.
