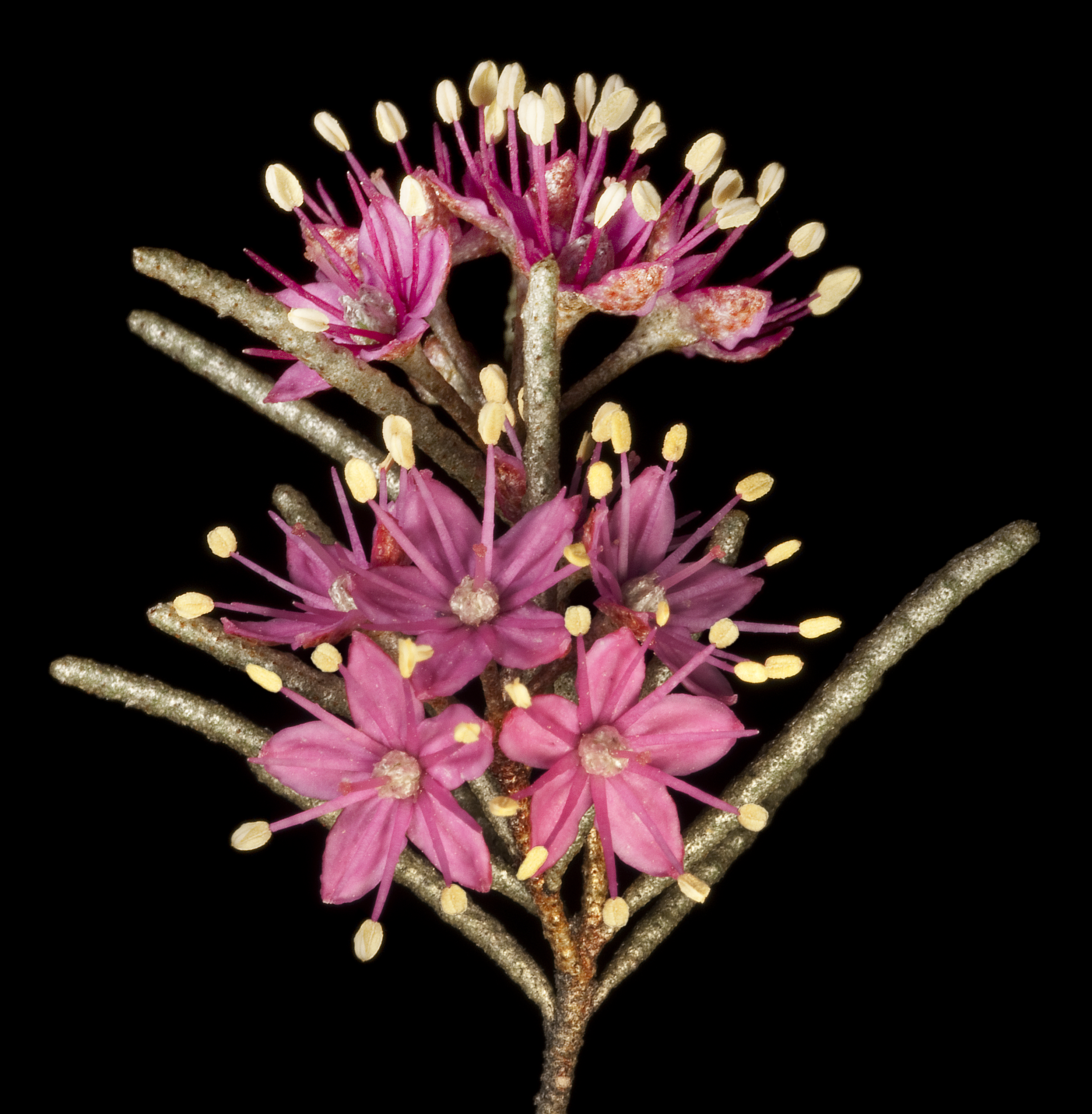
- Phebalium canaliculatum

Scientific classification
- Kingdom: Plantae
- Clade: Tracheophytes
- Clade: Angiosperms
- Clade: Eudicots
- Clade: Rosids
- Order: Sapindales
- Family: Rutaceae
- Subfamily: Zanthoxyloideae
- Genus: Phebalium; Vent.

Species
- See text.

Synonyms
- Crowea sect. Phebalium (Vent.) Baill.; Eriostemon sect. Phebalium (Vent.) F.Muell.; Phebalium sect. Euphebalium Benth. nom. inval.

= Phebalium =

Genus of shrubs

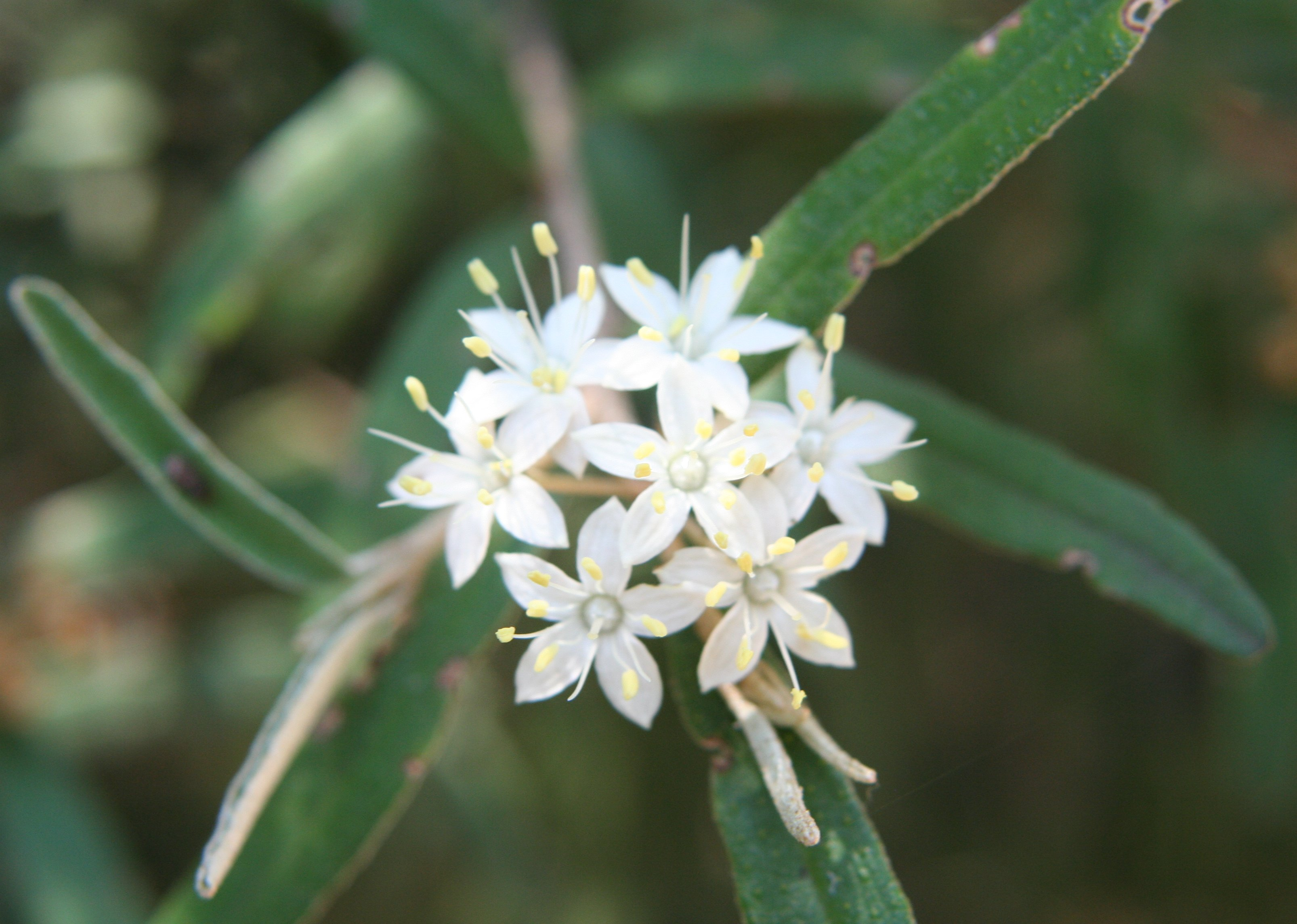
Phebalium daviesii

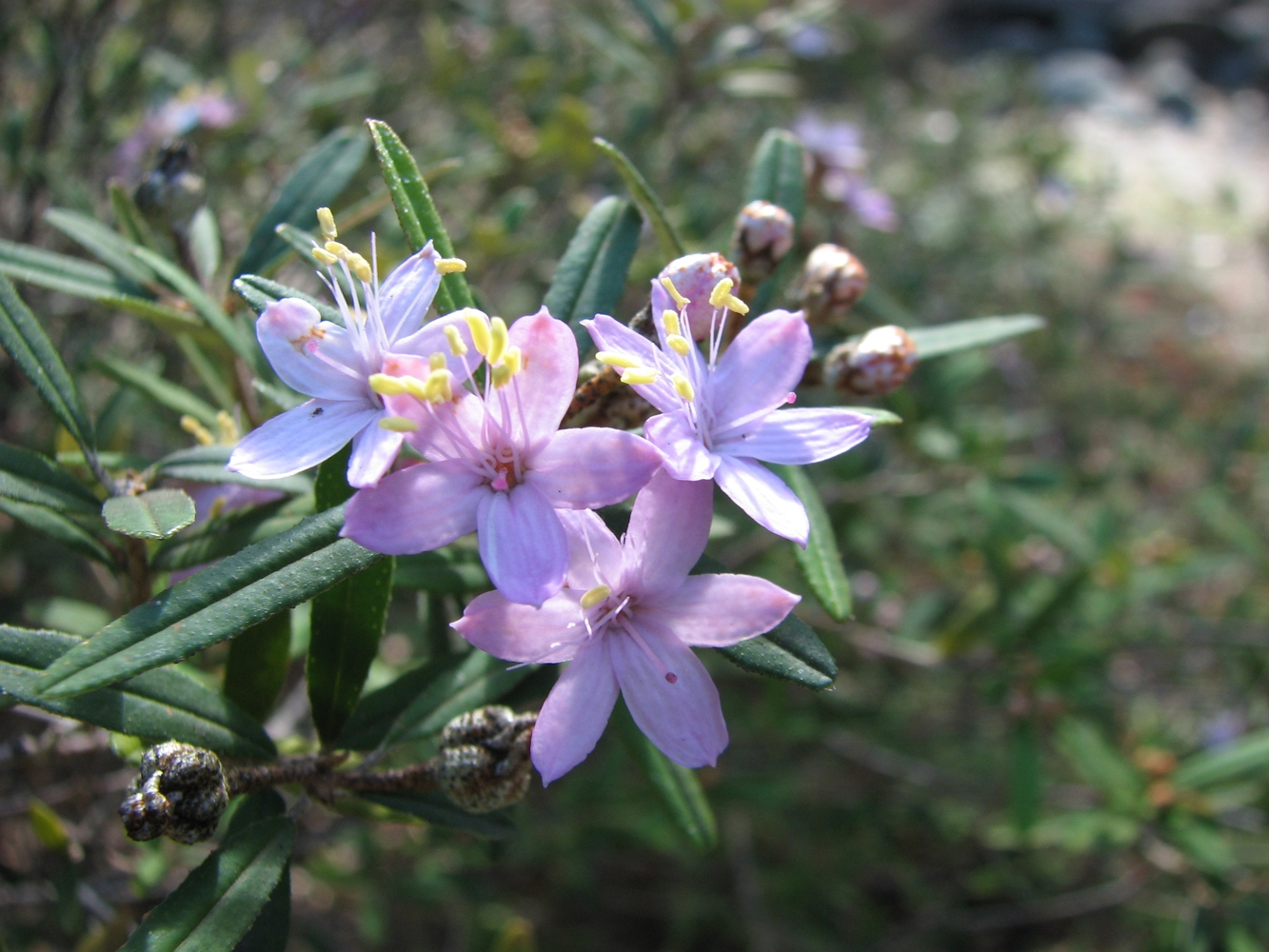
Phebalium nottii

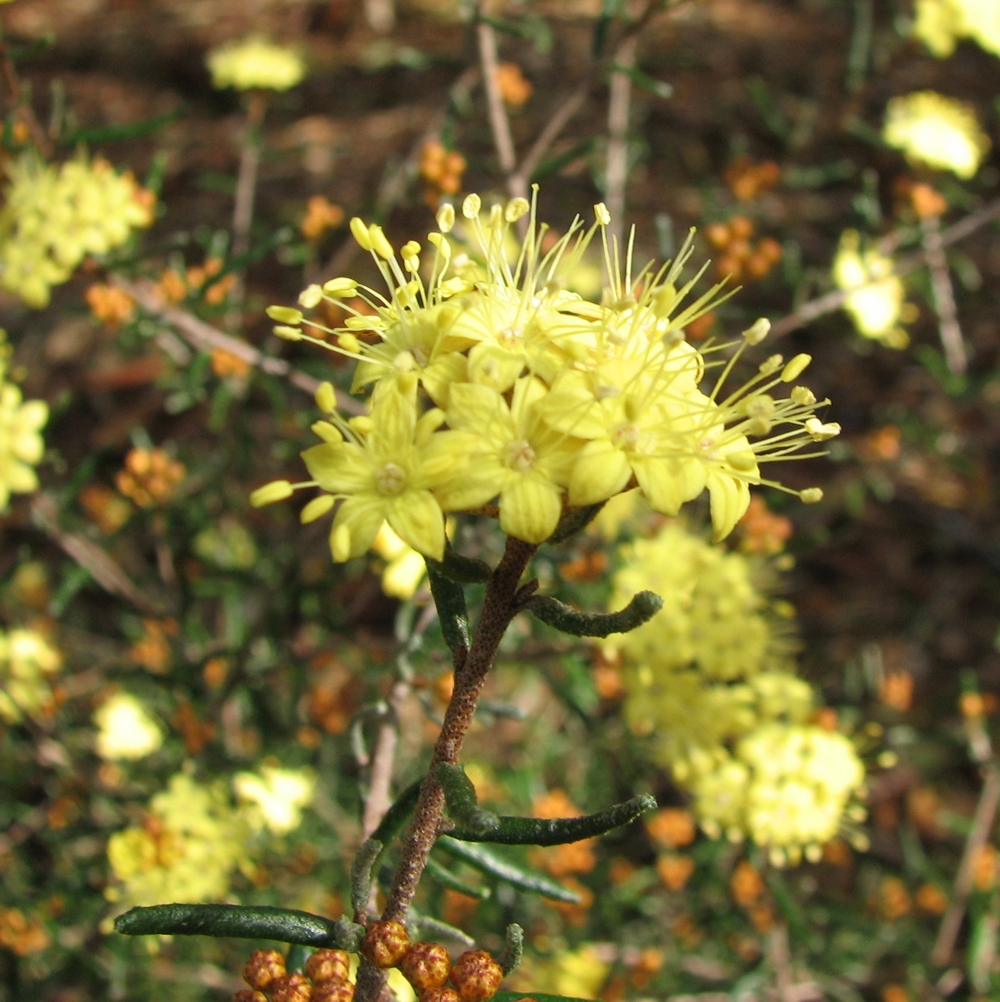
Phebalium stenophyllum

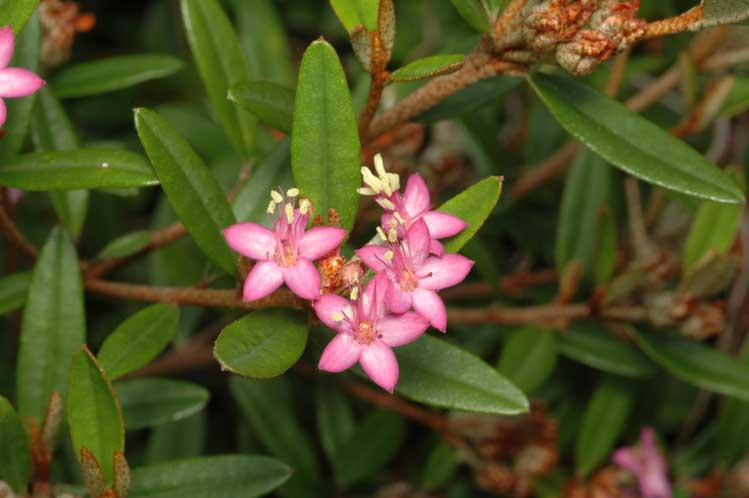
Phebalium woombye

Phebalium is a genus of thirty species of shrubs or small trees in the family Rutaceae and is endemic to Australia. The leaves are arranged alternately, simple and often warty, the flowers arranged singly or in umbels on the ends of branchlets or in leaf axils, usually with five sepals, five petals and ten stamens. There are about thirty species and they are found in all Australian states but not in the Northern Territory.

== Description ==
Plants in the genus Phebalium are shrubs or small trees that are often more or less covered with scales or shield-shaped or star-shaped hairs, at least when young. The leaves are arranged alternately along the stems, and are simple, sometimes with toothed edges. The flowers are bisexual and have five sepals, five petals and ten stamens. The sepals are fused at the base, usually with five lobes, and the stamens are free from each other. There are five carpels with the styles fused and the stigma is similar to the rest of the style. The fruit is a follicle and the seeds are released explosively.

== Taxonomy ==
The genus Phebalium was first formally described in 1805 by Étienne Pierre Ventenat in his book Jardin de la Malmaison. The first species described was Phebalium squamulosum.

=== Species list ===
The following is a list of species and subspecies recognised by the Australian Plant Census as at June 2020:

- Phebalium appressum Paul G.Wilson (W.A.)
- Phebalium bifidum P.H.Weston & M.Turton (N.S.W.)
- Phebalium brachycalyx Paul G.Wilson (W.A.)
- Phebalium brevifolium Paul G.Wilson (W.A.)
- Phebalium bullatum J.M.Black — silvery phebalium or desert phebalium (S.A., Vic.)
- Phebalium canaliculatum (F.Muell. & Tate) J.H.Willis (W.A.)
- Phebalium clavatum C.A.Gardner (W.A.)
- Phebalium daviesii Hook.f. — St Helens wax flower (Tas.)
- Phebalium distans P.I.Forst. (Qld.)
- Phebalium drummondii Benth. (W.A.)
- Phebalium elegans Paul G.Wilson (W.A.)
- Phebalium festivum Paul G.Wilson (Vic.)
- Phebalium filifolium Turcz. — slender phebalium (W.A.)
- Phebalium glandulosum Hook. — glandular phebalium or desert phebalium
  - Phebalium glandulosum subsp. angustifolium Paul G.Wilson (N.S.W.)
  - Phebalium glandulosum subsp. eglandulosum (Blakely) Paul G.Wilson (Qld., N.S.W.)
  - Phebalium glandulosum Hook. subsp. glandulosum (S.A., Qld., N.S.W.)
  - Phebalium glandulosum subsp. macrocalyx R.L.Giles (Vic.)
  - Phebalium glandulosum subsp. nitidum Paul G.Wilson (N.S.W.)
  - Phebalium glandulosum subsp. riparium R.L.Giles (Vic.)
- Phebalium laevigatum Paul G.Wilson (W.A.)
- Phebalium lepidotum (Turcz.) Paul G.Wilson (W.A.)
- Phebalium longifolium S.T.Blake (Qld.)
- Phebalium lowanense J.H.Willis (S.A., Vic.)
- Phebalium megaphyllum (Ewart) Paul G.Wilson (W.A.)
- Phebalium microphyllum Turcz. (W.A.)
- Phebalium nottii (F.Muell.) Maiden & Betche — pink phebalium (Qld., N.S.W.)
- Phebalium obcordatum Benth. — club-leaved phebalium (N.S.W.)
- Phebalium obovatum (Paul G.Wilson) Paul G.Wilson (W.A.)
- Phebalium speciosum I.Telford (N.S.W.)
- Phebalium squamulosum Vent. — forest phebalium, scaly phebalium
  - Phebalium squamulosum subsp. alpinum (Benth.) Paul G.Wilson (N.S.W., Vic.)
  - Phebalium squamulosum subsp. argenteum Paul G.Wilson (N.S.W., Vic.)
  - Phebalium squamulosum subsp. coriaceum Paul G.Wilson (N.S.W.)
  - Phebalium squamulosum subsp. gracile Paul G.Wilson (Qld., N.S.W.)
  - Phebalium squamulosum subsp. lineare Paul G.Wilson (N.S.W.)
  - Phebalium squamulosum subsp. ozothamnoides (F.Muell.) Paul G.Wilson (N.S.W., A.C.T., Vic.)
  - Phebalium squamulosum subsp. parvifolium Paul G.Wilson (N.S.W.)
  - Phebalium squamulosum Vent. subsp. squamulosum R.L.Giles (S.A., Qld., N.S.W., Vic.)
- Phebalium stenophyllum (Benth.) Maiden & Betche — narrow-leaved phebalium (S.A., N.S.W., Vic.)
- Phebalium tuberculosum (F.Muell.) Benth. (W.A.)
- Phebalium verrucosum (Paul G.Wilson) I.Telford & J.J.Bruhl (N.S.W.)
- Phebalium whitei Paul G.Wilson (Qld.)
- Phebalium woombye (F.M.Bailey) Domin (Qld., N.S.W.)

== Distribution ==
Species of Phebalium occur in all Australian states, but not in the Northern Territory.
