= Phebalium drummondii =

Conservation status
- Priority Three — Poorly Known Taxa (DEC)

Scientific classification
- Kingdom: Plantae
- Clade: Tracheophytes
- Clade: Angiosperms
- Clade: Eudicots
- Clade: Rosids
- Order: Sapindales
- Family: Rutaceae
- Genus: Phebalium
- Species: P. drummondii

Binomial name
- Phebalium drummondii Benth.

Synonyms
- Eriostemon benthami F.Muell. orth. var.; Eriostemon benthamii F.Muell.

Species of shrub

Phebalium drummondii is a species of small shrub that is endemic to Western Australia. It has smooth branchlets covered with silvery scales, broadly elliptic to egg-shaped leaves with silvery scales on the lower side and bright yellow flowers arranged in umbers on the ends of branchlets.

== Description ==
Phebalium drummondii is a shrub that typically grows to a height of 0.6–1.5 m (2 ft 0 in – 4 ft 11 in). Its branchlets are smooth and covered with silvery, scale-like hairs. The leaves are leathery, elliptic to egg-shaped with the narrower end towards the base, 3–5 mm (0.12–0.20 in) long and 1–2 mm (0.039–0.079 in) wide on a short petiole. The upper surface is smooth and the lower surface is covered with silvery scales. The flowers are bright yellow and borne in umbels of three to six. The five sepals are 2.5–3 mm (0.098–0.118 in) long, joined for half their length and covered with silvery scales on the outside. The petals are egg-shaped to elliptical, 4–5 mm (0.16–0.20 in) long and 2.5–3.5 mm (0.098–0.138 in) wide, covered with silvery scales on the outside and the petals are about 4 mm (0.16 in) long and 2.5 mm (0.098 in) wide and scaly on the back. Flowering occurs from July to September.

== Taxonomy and naming ==
Phebalium drummondii was first formally described in 1863 by George Bentham in Flora Australiensis from specimens collected by James Drummond.

== Distribution and habitat ==
This phebalium grows in shrubland on flats and roadsides in the Merredin and Newdegate districts.

== Conservation status ==
This phebalium is classified as "Priority Three" by the Government of Western Australia Department of Parks and Wildlife meaning that it is poorly known and known from only a few locations but is not under imminent threat.
