= Phebalium obovatum =

Scientific classification
- Kingdom: Plantae
- Clade: Tracheophytes
- Clade: Angiosperms
- Clade: Eudicots
- Clade: Rosids
- Order: Sapindales
- Family: Rutaceae
- Genus: Phebalium
- Species: P. obovatum

Binomial name
- Phebalium obovatum (Paul G.Wilson) Paul G.Wilson

Synonyms
- Phebalium lepidotum var. obovatum Paul G.Wilson

Species of shrub

Phebalium obovatum is a species of spreading shrub that is endemic to Western Australia. It has thick, egg-shaped or elliptical leaves densely covered with silvery scales on the lower side and white flowers arranged in umbels with silvery or rust-coloured scales on the back.

== Description ==
Phebalium obovatum is a spreading shrub that typically grows to a height of 0.2–1.0 m (7.9 in – 3 ft 3.4 in). The leaves are thick, egg-shaped to elliptical, about 5 mm (0.20 in) long and 1.5–2 mm (0.059–0.079 in) wide. The leaves are glossy on the upper surface, covered with silvery scales on the lower surface. The flowers are borne in umbels, each flower on a scaly pedicel 1.5–2.5 mm (0.059–0.098 in) long. The five sepals are 2–2.5 mm (0.079–0.098 in) long, joined for half their length and covered with silvery to rust-coloured scales on the outside. The petals are white, elliptical, about 4 mm (0.16 in) long with silvery to rust-coloured scales on the back. Flowering occurs from September to December.

== Taxonomy ==
This species was first formally described in 1970 by Paul Wilson in the journal Nuytsia, and was given the name Phebalium lepidotum var. obovatum. In 1998, following "field studies over the past thirty years", Wilson raised the variety to species status as Phebelium obovatum.

== Distribution and habitat ==
Phebalium obovatum grows in heath or mallee woodland in the Ravensthorpe district.

== Conservation status ==
This phebalium is classified as "not threatened" by the Government of Western Australia Department of Parks and Wildlife.
