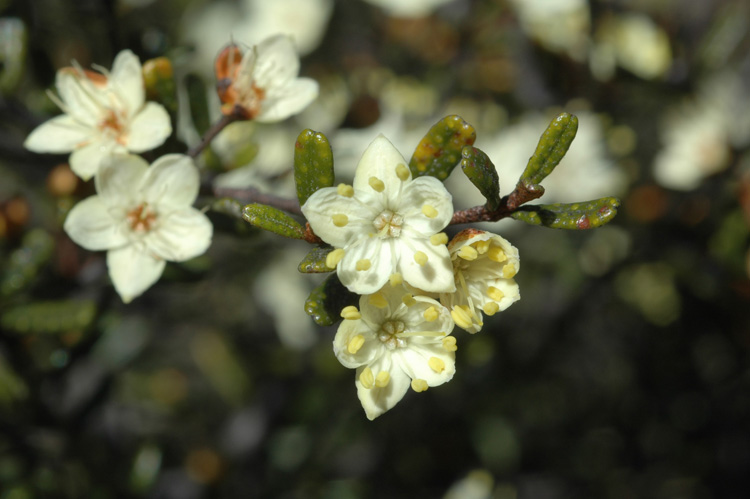
- In Australian National Botanic Gardens

Scientific classification
- Kingdom: Plantae
- Clade: Tracheophytes
- Clade: Angiosperms
- Clade: Eudicots
- Clade: Rosids
- Order: Sapindales
- Family: Rutaceae
- Genus: Phebalium
- Species: P. lepidotum

Binomial name
- Phebalium lepidotum (Turcz.) Paul G.Wilson

Synonyms
- Boronia lepidota Turcz.; Eriostemon maxwellii F.Muell.; Phebalium lepidotum (Turcz.) Paul G.Wilson var. lepidotum; Phebalium maxwellii (F.Muell.) Engl.

= Phebalium lepidotum =

Species of shrub

Phebalium lepidotum is a species of rounded shrub that is endemic to Western Australia. It has scaly branchlets, leathery, narrow oblong leaves and white to cream-coloured flowers arranged in umbels of between three and six on the ends of branchlets.

== Description ==
Phebalium lepidotum is a rounded slender shrub that typically grows to a height of 0.45–1.5 m (1 ft 6 in – 4 ft 11 in). Its branchlets are slightly glandular-warty and covered with scales. The leaves are leathery, narrow oblong, 5–15 mm (0.20–0.59 in) long and 1.5–2 mm (0.059–0.079 in) wide on a short petiole, glabrous on the upper surface and covered with silvery scales on the lower surface. The flowers are white or cream-coloured and borne in umbels of between three and six, each flower on a thin pedicel about 5 mm (0.20 in) long. The five sepals are about 1.5 mm (0.059 in) long, joined for half their length and covered with rust-coloured scales on the outside. The petals are broadly elliptical, 4–5 mm (0.16–0.20 in) long and 3–3.5 mm (0.12–0.14 in) wide, covered with rust-coloured scales on the back. Flowering occurs from August to November.

== Taxonomy ==
This species was first formally described in 1863 by Nikolai Turczaninow and given the name Boronia lepidota in the journal Bulletin de la Société Impériale des Naturalistes de Moscou, from specimens collected by James Drummond. In 1970, Paul G. Wilson changed the name to Phebalium lepidotum, publishing the change in the journal Nuytsia.

== Distribution ==
Phebalium lepidotum is found between Merredin, Zanthus and the south coast of Western Australia.

== Conservation status ==
This phebalium is classified as "not threatened" by the Government of Western Australia Department of Parks and Wildlife.
