= Phebalium microphyllum =

Scientific classification
- Kingdom: Plantae
- Clade: Tracheophytes
- Clade: Angiosperms
- Clade: Eudicots
- Clade: Rosids
- Order: Sapindales
- Family: Rutaceae
- Genus: Phebalium
- Species: P. microphyllum

Binomial name
- Phebalium microphyllum Turcz.

Synonyms
- Eriostemon tuberculosus var. laevis F.Muell.; Eriostemon tuberculosus var. microphyllus (Turcz.) Ewart nom. illeg.

Species of shrub

Habit in Frank Hann National Park

Phebalium microphyllum is a species of small, rounded shrub that is endemic to Western Australia. It has scaly branchlets, leathery, oblong leaves, and yellow flowers arranged in umbels of three to six on the ends of branchlets.

== Description ==
Phebalium microphyllum is a rounded shrub that typically grows to a height of 0.3–1.5 m (1 ft 0 in – 4 ft 11 in) and has scaly branchlets. The leaves are leathery, oblong, 3–4 mm (0.12–0.16 in) long and about 1.5 mm (0.059 in) wide on a short petiole. The leaves are glabrous on the upper surface, covered with silvery scales on the lower surface and have slightly wavy edges. The flowers are yellow and borne in umbels of between three and six, each flower on a thin pedicel 3–6 mm (0.12–0.24 in) long. The five sepals are about 1 mm (0.039 in) long, joined for half their length and covered with rust-coloured scales on the outside. The petals are elliptical, about 3.5 mm (0.14 in) long with rust-coloured scales on the back. Flowering occurs from September to December.

== Taxonomy ==
This species was first formally described in 1852 by Nikolai Turczaninow in the journal Bulletin de la Société Impériale des Naturalistes de Moscou. The specific epithet (microphyllum) means 'small-leaved'.

== Distribution ==
Phebalium microphyllum grows on undulating plains between Lake Grace and the Fitzgerald River National Park.

== Conservation status ==
This phebalium is classified as 'Not threatened' by the Government of Western Australia Department of Parks and Wildlife.
