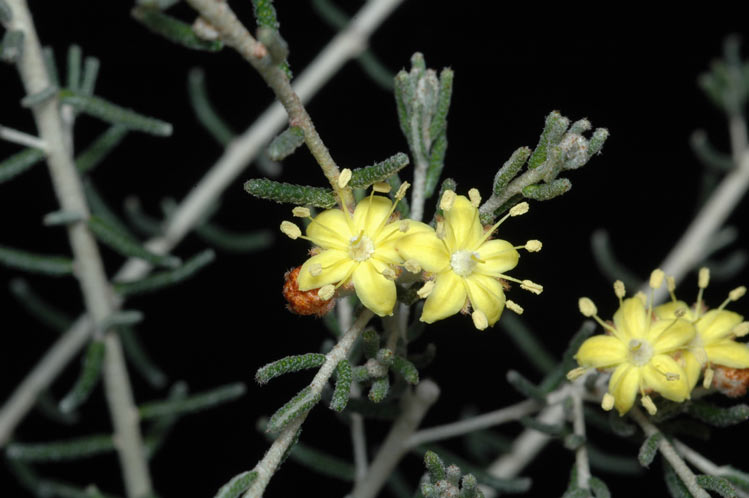
- In the Australian National Botanic Gardens

Conservation status
- Vulnerable (EPBC Act)

Scientific classification
- Kingdom: Plantae
- Clade: Tracheophytes
- Clade: Angiosperms
- Clade: Eudicots
- Clade: Rosids
- Order: Sapindales
- Family: Rutaceae
- Genus: Phebalium
- Species: P. lowanense

Binomial name
- Phebalium lowanense J.H.Willis

= Phebalium lowanense =

Lowan phebalium

Species of shrub

Phebalium lowanense, commonly known as the Lowan phebalium, is a species of slender shrub that is endemic to southern continental Australia. It is more or less covered with silvery and rust-coloured scales and has leaves appearing to be cylindrical, and yellow mauve flowers in umbels on the ends of branches.

== Description ==
Phebalium lowanense is a slender shrub that typically grows to a height of 0.6–0.8 m (2 ft 0 in – 2 ft 7 in) and is more or less covered with silvery or rust-coloured scales. The leaves are linear, 3–12 mm (0.12–0.47 in) long and about 1 mm (0.039 in) wide but with the edges strongly rolled under, so that they appear cylindrical. The upper surface of the leaves is glabrous and slightly scaly, and the lower surface is covered with silvery scales. The flowers are yellow and arranged in umbels on the ends of branchlets with up to six flowers, each flower on a thick pedicel 3–7 mm (0.12–0.28 in) long. The sepals are 3–4 mm (0.12–0.16 in) long and joined for about half their length, and densely covered with silvery scales and star-shaped hairs. The petals are egg-shaped, about 5 mm (0.20 in) long and 2.5 mm (0.098 in) wide, covered with silvery and rust-coloured scales on the back. Flowering occurs August to September.

== Taxonomy and naming ==
Phebalium lowanense was first formally described in 1957 by James Hamlyn Willis in The Victorian Naturalist from specimens he collected near the border between South Australia and Victoria in 1948.

== Distribution and habitat ==
Lowan phebalium grows in open heathy mallee woodland in a restricted area in the Murray Darling Depression biogeographic region near the South Australia-Victoria border.

== Conservation status ==
This phebalium is classified as "vulnerable" under the Australian Government Environment Protection and Biodiversity Conservation Act 1999. The main threats to the species are changed fire regimes, weed invasion, and clearing of roadsides and tracks.
