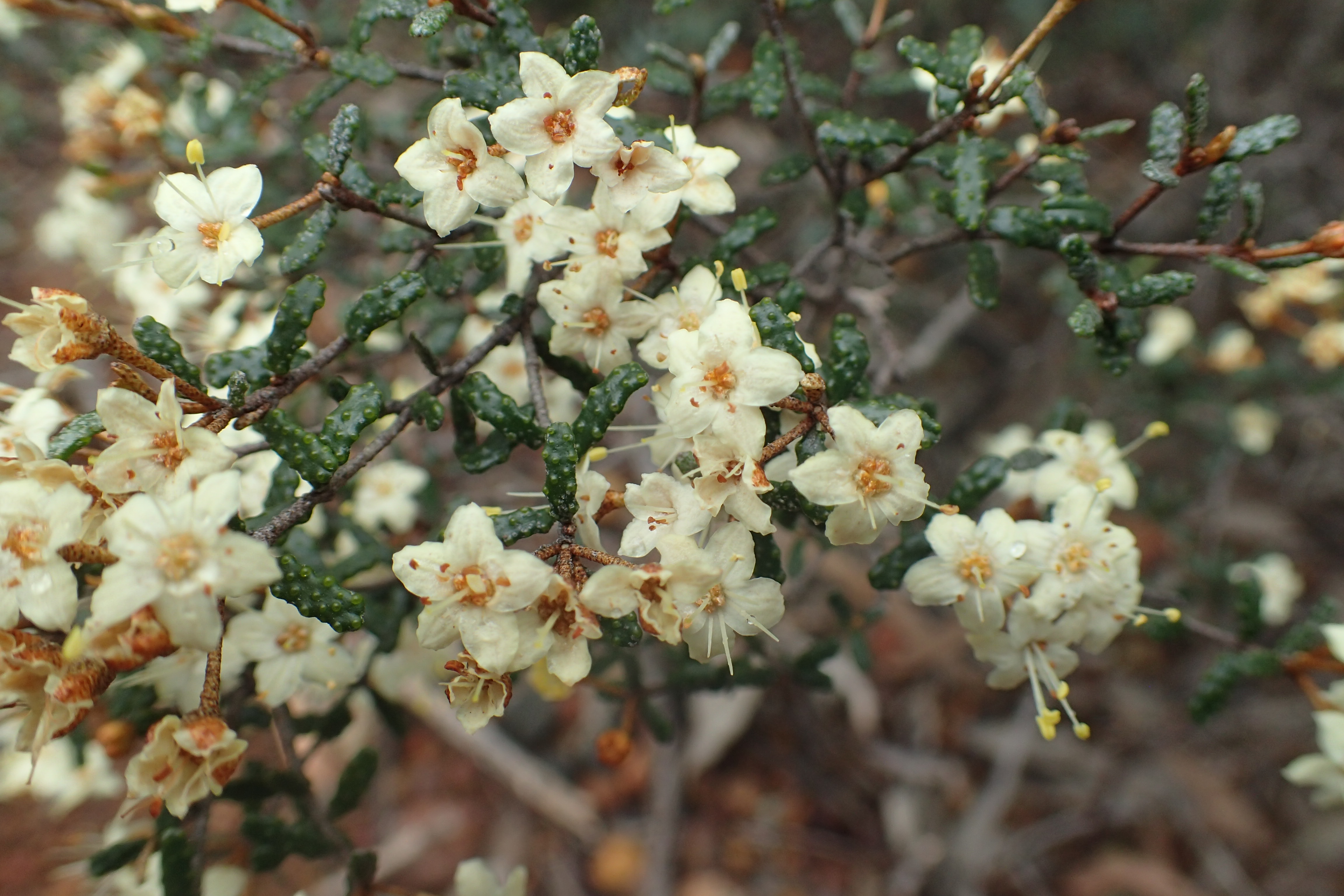

Scientific classification
- Kingdom: Plantae
- Clade: Tracheophytes
- Clade: Angiosperms
- Clade: Eudicots
- Clade: Rosids
- Order: Sapindales
- Family: Rutaceae
- Genus: Phebalium
- Species: P. tuberculosum

Binomial name
- Phebalium tuberculosum (F.Muell.) Benth.

Synonyms
- Eriostemon tubersulosus F.Muell.; Phebalium tuberculosum (F.Muell.) Benth. subsp. tuberculosum

= Phebalium tuberculosum =

Species of shrub

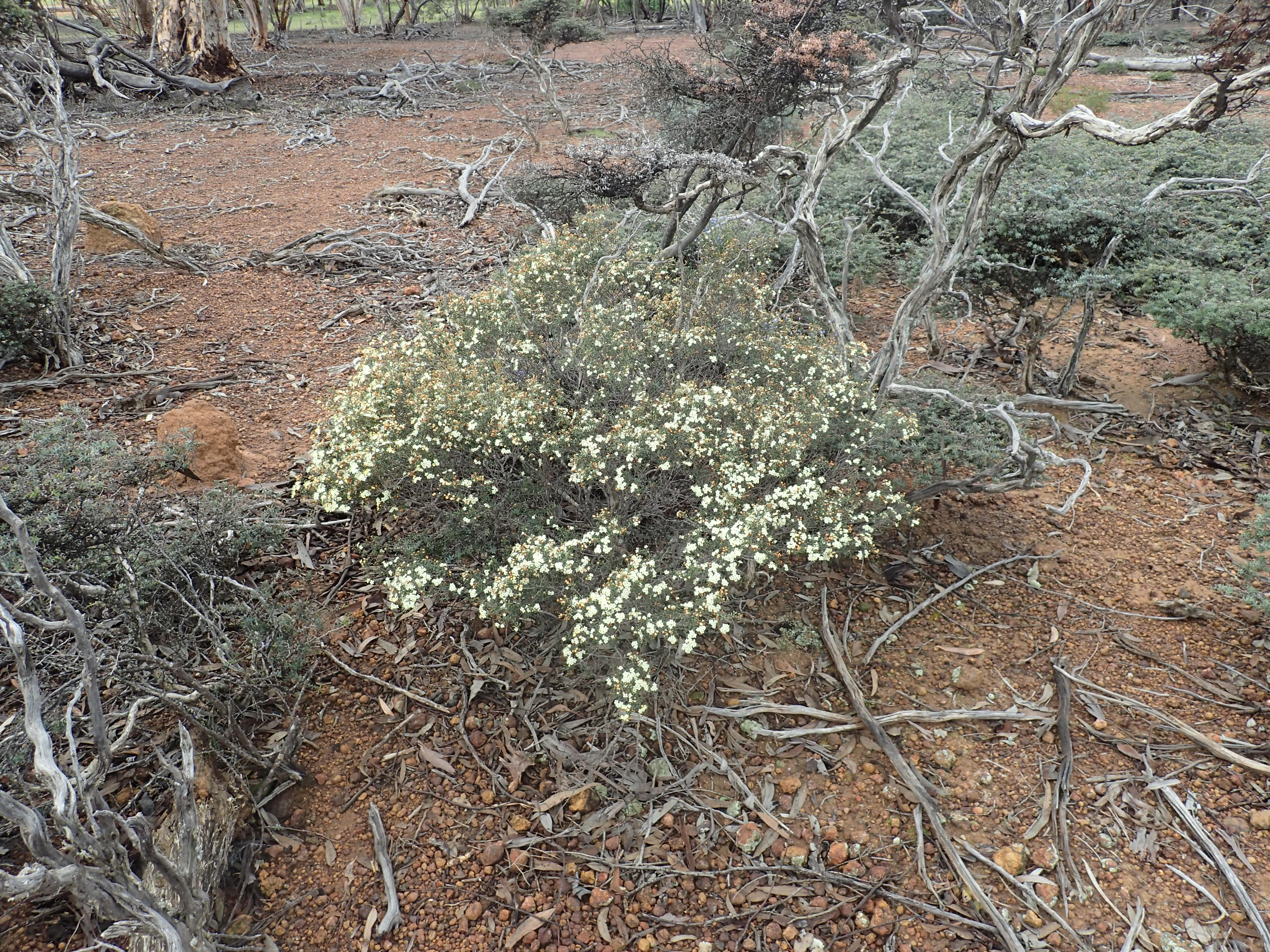
Habit in Corrigin Nature Reserve

Phebalium tuberculosum is a species of erect shrub that is endemic to Western Australia. It has glandular-warty and scaly branchlets and leaves and white flowers arranged in umbels of three or four with rust-coloured scales on the back of the petals.

== Description ==
Phebalium tuberculosum is an erect shrub that typically grows to a height of 0.3–4.0 m (1 ft 0 in – 13 ft 1 in) with glandular-warty branchlets, leaves and sepals. The leaves are oblong with the edges rolled under, appearing more or less cylindrical, and are about 4–7 mm (0.16–0.28 in) long and about 1 mm (0.039 in) wide. The flowers are borne in umbels of three or four, each flower on a thick pedicel 2–5 mm (0.079–0.197 in) long covered with rust-coloured scales. The five sepals are 2–3 mm (0.079–0.118 in) long, joined at the base. The petals are white, broadly elliptical, 3–4.5 mm (0.12–0.18 in) long and 2–3.5 mm (0.079–0.138 in) wide, with silvery to rust-coloured scales on the back. Flowering occurs from September to December.

== Taxonomy ==
This species was first formally described in 1862 by Ferdinand von Mueller who gave it the name Eriostemon tuberculosus and published the description his book The Plants Indigenous to the Colony of Victoria.

The following year, George Bentham changed the name to Phebalium tuberculosum, publishing the change in Flora Australiensis.

== Distribution and habitat ==
Phebalium tuberculosum grows on lateritic hills, on granite dunes and plains between Kalbarri, Katanning and Zanthus in Western Australia.

== Conservation status ==
This phebalium is classified as "not threatened" by the Government of Western Australia Department of Parks and Wildlife.
