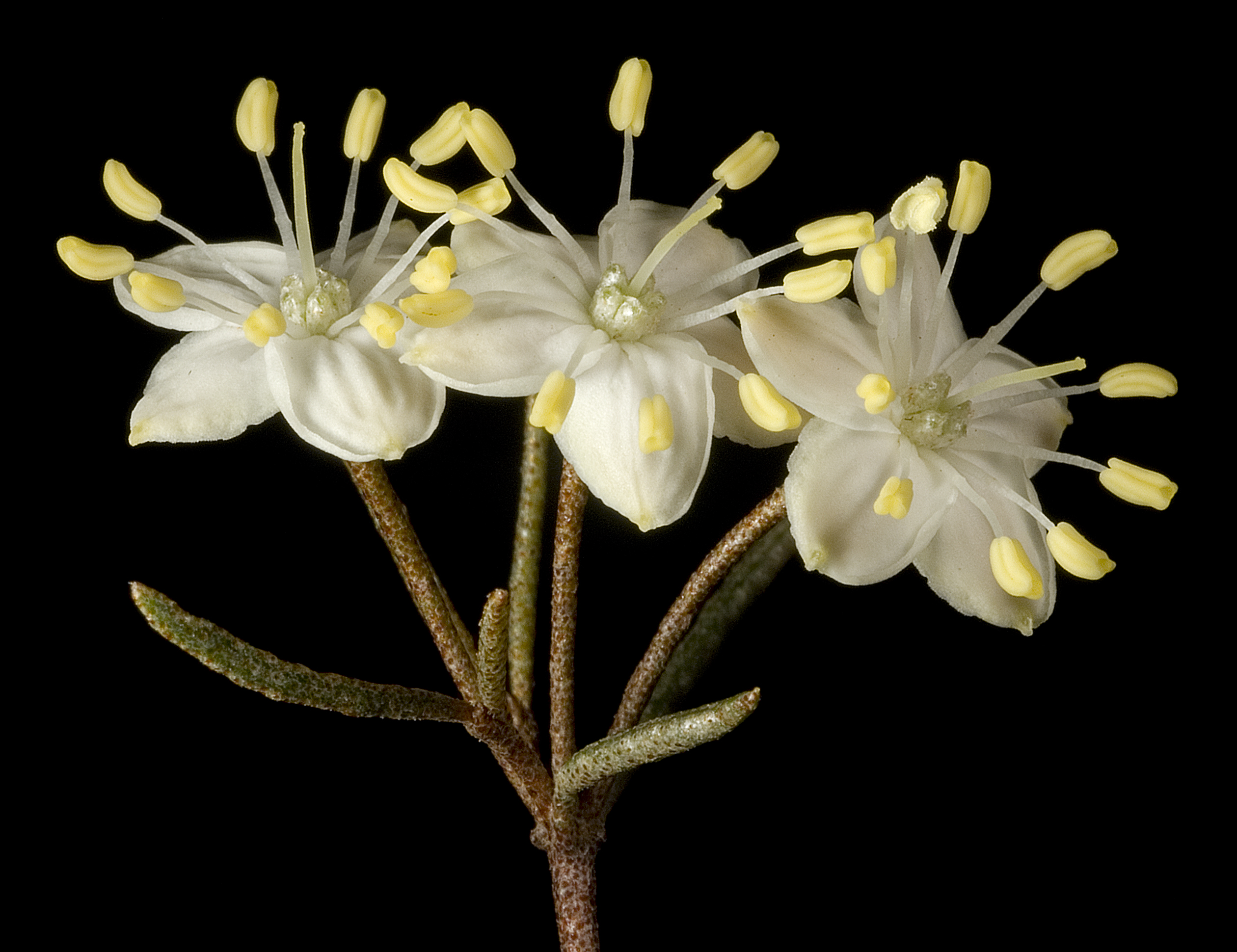
- Phebalium filifolium near Kondinin

Scientific classification
- Kingdom: Plantae
- Clade: Tracheophytes
- Clade: Angiosperms
- Clade: Eudicots
- Clade: Rosids
- Order: Sapindales
- Family: Rutaceae
- Genus: Phebalium
- Species: P. filifolium

Binomial name
- Phebalium filifolium Turcz.

Synonyms
- Eriostemon filifolius (Turcz.) F.Muell.

= Phebalium filifolium =

Slender phebalium

Species of shrub

Phebalium filifolium, commonly known as slender phebalium, is a species of upright, rounded shrub that is endemic to Western Australia. It has smooth branchlets covered with silvery scales, more or less cylindrical leaves with silvery scales on the lower side and pale to bright yellow flowers arranged in umbels of between three and eight on the ends of branchlets.

== Description ==
Phebalium filifolium is an erect, spreading or rounded shrub that typically grows to a height of 0.3–1.5 m (1 ft 0 in – 4 ft 11 in). Its branchlets are smooth and covered with silvery, scale-like hairs. The leaves are more or less cylindrical or bluntly triangular in cross-section, about 15 mm (0.59 in) long and 1 mm (0.039 in) wide, glabrous on the upper surface and covered with silvery or rust-coloured scales on the lower surface. The flowers are pale to bright yellow and borne in umbels of three to eight. The five sepals are 1–1.5 mm (0.039–0.059 in) long, joined for half their length and covered with rust-coloured scales on the outside. The petals are broadly elliptical, 3.5–5.5 mm (0.14–0.22 in) long and 2.5–3.5 mm (0.098–0.138 in) wide, covered with silvery scales on the outside. Flowering occurs from September to December.

== Taxonomy ==
Phebalium filifolium was first formally described in 1863 by Nikolai Turczaninow in Bulletin de la Société Impériale des Naturalistes de Moscou from specimens collected by James Drummond.

== Distribution and habitat ==
This phebalium grows on sandy and gravelly soils and is found between Dalwallinu, Menzies, Katanning and the Cape Arid National Park in Western Australia.

== Conservation status ==
This phebalium is classified as "not threatened" by the Government of Western Australia Department of Parks and Wildlife.
