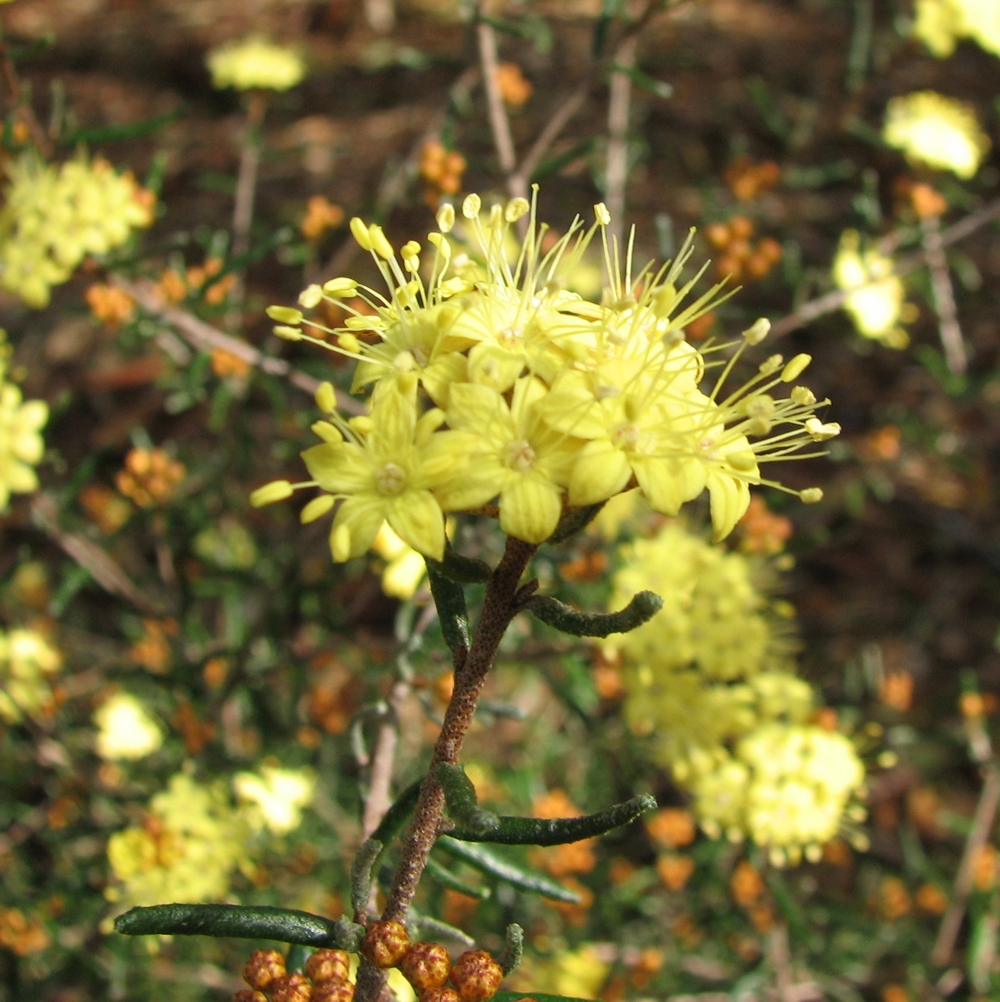
- Phebalium stenophyllum in Maranoa Gardens

Scientific classification
- Kingdom: Plantae
- Clade: Tracheophytes
- Clade: Angiosperms
- Clade: Eudicots
- Clade: Rosids
- Order: Sapindales
- Family: Rutaceae
- Genus: Phebalium
- Species: P. stenophyllum

Binomial name
- Phebalium stenophyllum (Benth.) Maiden & Betche

Synonyms
- Phebalium squamulosum var. stenophyllum Benth.; Eriostemon stenophyllus (Benth.) F.Muell.

= Phebalium stenophyllum =

Narrow-leaved phebalium

Species of shrub

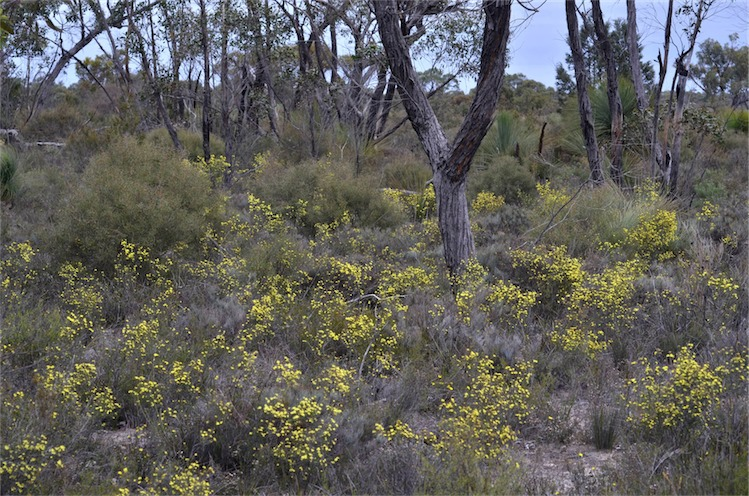
Habit in Little Desert National Park

Phebalium stenophyllum, commonly known as narrow-leaved phebalium, is a species of small shrub that is endemic to south-eastern Australia. It has scaly branchlets, narrow oblong to more or less cylindrical leaves and yellow flowers in umbels of three to ten.

== Description ==
Phebalium stenophyllum is a shrub that typically grows to a height of 1–1.5 m (3 ft 3 in – 4 ft 11 in) and has silvery to rust-coloured scales on its branchlets. It has narrow oblong leaves with the edges rolled under, appearing more or less cylindrical, 4–20 mm (0.16–0.79 in) long and 0.8–3 mm (0.031–0.118 in) wide on a short petiole. The upper surface is glabrous on older leaves, the lower surface covered with silvery scales or obscured. The flowers are arranged in sessile umbels of three to ten flowers, each flower on a pedicel 3–8 mm (0.12–0.31 in) long. The calyx is hemispherical, about 1 mm (0.039 in) high and 2 mm (0.079 in) wide and covered with silvery to rust-coloured scales. The petals are yellow, elliptical, 3.5–4.5 mm (0.14–0.18 in) long and about 2 mm (0.079 in) wide with silvery and rust-coloured scales on the back. Flowering occurs in spring.

== Taxonomy ==
This species was first formally described as Phebalium squamulosum var. stenophyllum by George Bentham in Flora Australiensis in 1863. The type specimen was collected by botanist Ferdinand von Mueller in "the Grampian Mountains and desert of the Tattiara country towards the Murray river". It was subsequently published as a species in its own right by Joseph Maiden and Ernst Betche in A Census of New South Wales Plants in 1916.

== Distribution and habitat ==
Narrow-leaved phebalium grows in eucalypt woodland, heath or mallee in disjunct populations in the central and southern tablelands of New South Wales and near the Victorian-South Australian border. It has also been recorded from Mt Zero and Mt Abrupt in the Grampians National Park and from near Blackwood.

== Use in horticulture ==
Phebalium stenophyllum is cultivated as an ornamental flowering shrub. The species has some frost tolerance and performs best in a well-drained, partially shaded position. Established plants can withstand dry periods.
