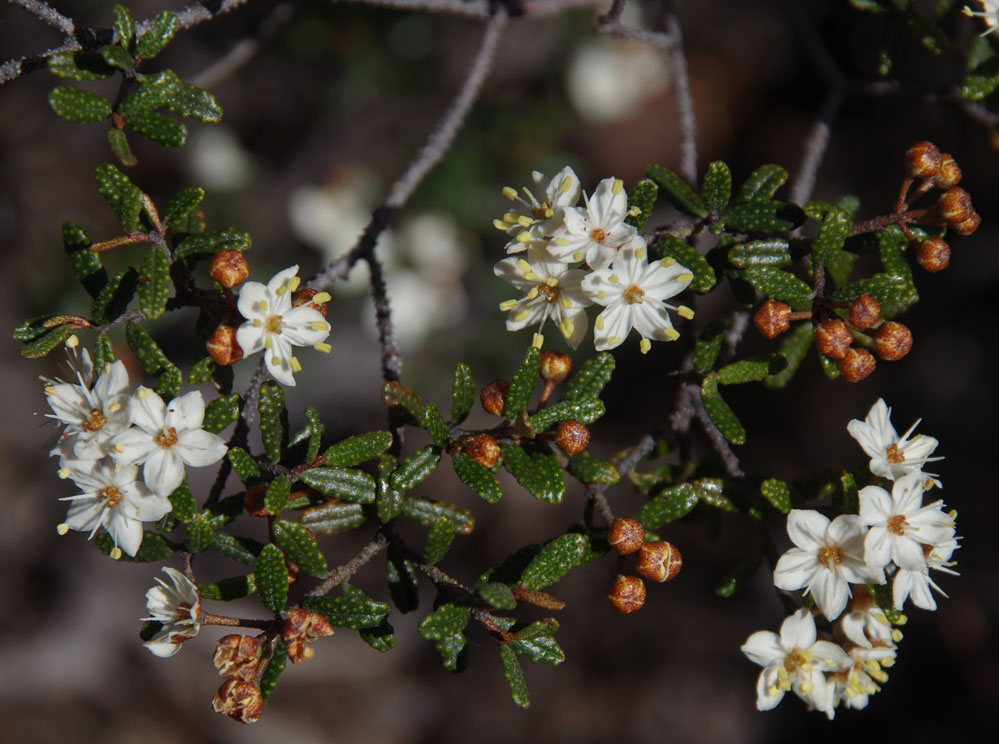
- In Wongan Hills

Scientific classification
- Kingdom: Plantae
- Clade: Tracheophytes
- Clade: Angiosperms
- Clade: Eudicots
- Clade: Rosids
- Order: Sapindales
- Family: Rutaceae
- Genus: Phebalium
- Species: P. megaphyllum

Binomial name
- Phebalium megaphyllum (Ewart) Paul G.Wilson

= Phebalium megaphyllum =

Species of shrub

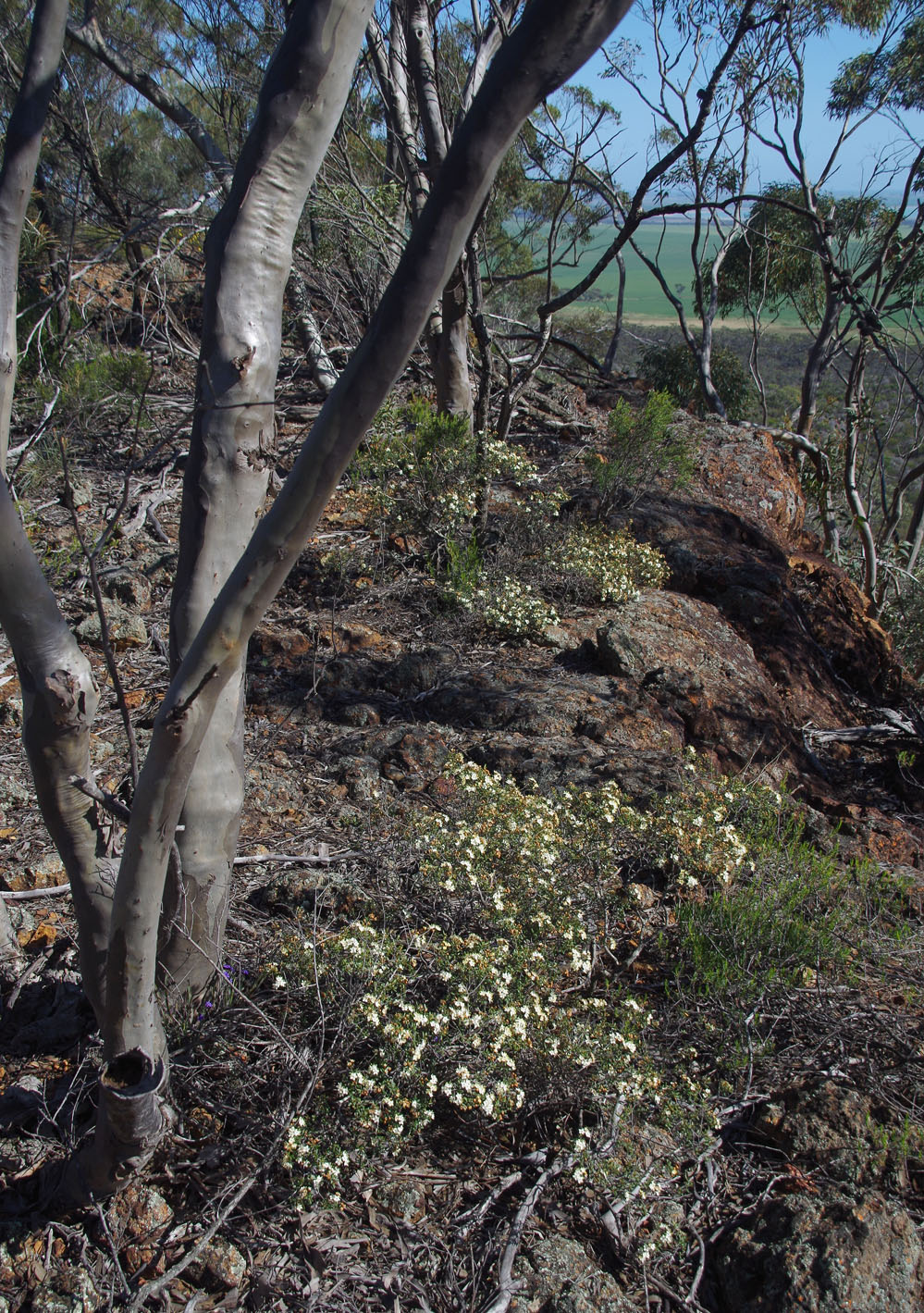
Habit

Phebalium megaphyllum is a species of erect, rounded shrub that is endemic to Western Australia. It has glandular-warty branchlets, oblong to wedge-shaped leaves with a groove on the upper surface, and white flowers arranged in umbels of three to six on the ends of branchlets.

== Description ==
Phebalium megaphyllum is an erect, rounded shrub that typically grows to a height of 0.4–2 m (1 ft 4 in – 6 ft 7 in). Its branchlets are glandular-warty and the leaves are linear oblong to wedge-shaped, 7–15 mm (0.28–0.59 in) long and 2–4 mm (0.079–0.157 in) wide on a short petiole. The upper surface is glabrous with a central groove and the lower surface is covered with silvery scales and has a prominent, warty mid-vein. The flowers are white and borne in umbels of three to six, each flower on a pedicel 4–6 mm (0.16–0.24 in) long. The five sepals are 3.5–4.5 mm (0.14–0.18 in) long, joined for half their length and covered with rust-coloured scales on the outside. The petals are broadly elliptical, 4–5 mm (0.16–0.20 in) long and 2.5–3.5 mm (0.098–0.138 in) wide, covered with silvery or rust-coloured scales. Flowering occurs from September to November.

== Taxonomy ==
This phebalium was first formally described in 1907 by Alfred James Ewart who gave it the name Eriostemon tuberculosus var. megaphyllus and published the description in Proceedings of the Royal Society of Victoria. In 1998, Paul G. Wilson changed the name to Phebalium megaphyllum, publishing the change in the journal Nuytsia.

== Distribution and habitat ==
Phebalium megaphyllum grows in scrub on undulating plains, ironstone hills and breakaways between Mullewa, Coolgardie and Ravensthorpe.

== Conservation status ==
This phebalium is classified as "not threatened" by the Government of Western Australia Department of Parks and Wildlife.
