= Phebalium clavatum =

Conservation status
- Priority Two — Poorly Known Taxa (DEC)

Scientific classification
- Kingdom: Plantae
- Clade: Tracheophytes
- Clade: Angiosperms
- Clade: Eudicots
- Clade: Rosids
- Order: Sapindales
- Family: Rutaceae
- Genus: Phebalium
- Species: P. clavatum

Binomial name
- Phebalium clavatum C.A.Gardner

Species of shrub

Phebalium clavatum is a species of shrub that is endemic to Western Australia and is more or less covered with silvery scales. It has warty branchlets, more or less circular leaves with a large spherical gland and white flowers arranged singly on the ends of branchlets.

== Description ==
Phebalium clavatum is a shrub that typically grows to a height of 0.5–1.5 m (1 ft 8 in – 4 ft 11 in). Its branchlets are covered with pale red glands and silvery, scale-like hairs. The leaves are more or less circular, about 1.5 mm (0.059 in) in diameter on a cylindrical petiole 1.5–2 mm (0.059–0.079 in) long. The leaves and petiole are covered with silvery scales and the leaf has a large spherical gland. The flowers are white, sessile and borne on the ends of branchlets with two scaly bracteoles about 1 mm (0.039 in) long at the base. The five sepals are 2.5–3 mm (0.098–0.118 in) long, joined for half their length and covered with silvery scales. The petals are egg-shaped to elliptical, 4–5 mm (0.16–0.20 in) long and 2.5–3.5 mm (0.098–0.138 in) wide, covered with silvery scales on the back and the stamens are slightly longer than the petals. Flowering occurs from August to September.

== Taxonomy and naming ==
Phebalium clavatum was first formally described in 1943 by Charles Gardner in the journal Journal of the Royal Society of Western Australia from specimens he collected near Widgiemooltha.

== Distribution and habitat ==
This phebalium grows on sandplains in the Coolgardie district of Western Australia.

== Conservation status ==
This phebalium is classified as "Priority Two" by the Western Australian Government Department of Parks and Wildlife, meaning that it is poorly known and from only one or a few locations.
