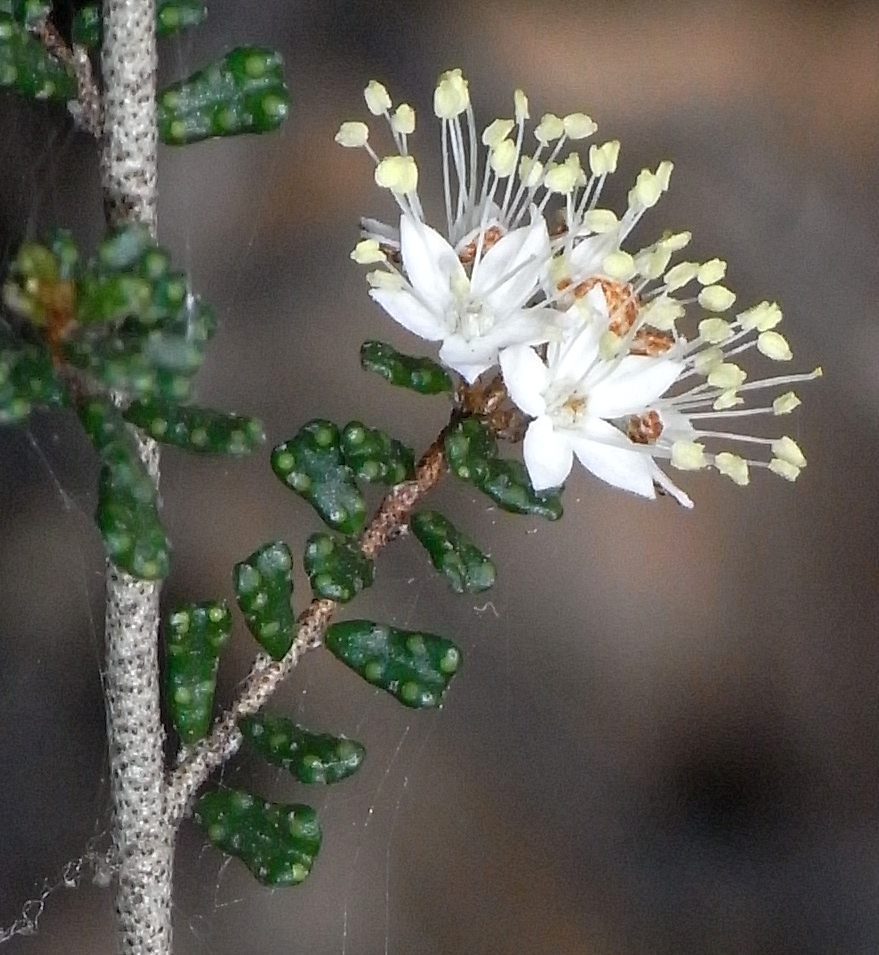
- Phebalium festivum in Greater Bendigo National Park

Scientific classification
- Kingdom: Plantae
- Clade: Tracheophytes
- Clade: Angiosperms
- Clade: Eudicots
- Clade: Rosids
- Order: Sapindales
- Family: Rutaceae
- Genus: Phebalium
- Species: P. festivum

Binomial name
- Phebalium festivum Paul G.Wilson

= Phebalium festivum =

Dainty phebalium

Species of shrub

Phebalium festivum, commonly known as dainty phebalium, is a species of spreading shrub that is endemic to Victoria, Australia. It has smooth branchlets, broadly egg-shaped, warty leaves and three to ten white or pale yellow flowers arranged in umbels on the ends of branchlets.

== Description ==
Phebalium festivum is a shrub that typically grows to a height of 0.6–1.5 m (2 ft 0 in – 4 ft 11 in). It has mostly smooth branchlets densely covered with rust-coloured scales. The leaves are egg-shaped with the narrower end towards the base, 2–3.5 mm (0.079–0.138 in) long and 1.5–2.5 mm (0.059–0.098 in) wide, the upper surface and covered with warty glands, the lower surface densely covered with silvery scales. Three to ten white to pale yellow flowers are arranged in sessile umbels on the ends of branchlets, each flower on a silvery-scaly pedicel 2–3 mm (0.079–0.118 in) long. The calyx is hemispherical, about 0.5–1 mm (0.020–0.039 in) long, with silvery to reddish-brown scales on the outside. The petals are elliptical, about 2.5 mm (0.098 in) long and covered with silvery to rust-coloured scales on the back. Flowering occurs in spring and summer.

== Taxonomy and naming ==
Phebalium festivum was first formally described in 1998 by Paul Wilson in the journal Nuytsia from specimens collected at Flagstaff Hill near Eaglehawk in 1952. The specific epithet refers to the "pleasant aspect of the plant when in flower".

== Distribution and habitat ==
Phebalium festivum grows in forest near Bendigo in western Victoria.
