= Phebalium appressum =

Conservation status
- Priority One — Poorly Known Taxa (DEC)

Scientific classification
- Kingdom: Plantae
- Clade: Tracheophytes
- Clade: Angiosperms
- Clade: Eudicots
- Clade: Rosids
- Order: Sapindales
- Family: Rutaceae
- Genus: Phebalium
- Species: P. appressum

Binomial name
- Phebalium appressum Paul G.Wilson

Species of shrub

Phebalium appressum is a species of shrub that is endemic to the southwest of Western Australia. It is more or less covered with silvery scales and has egg-shaped to heart-shaped leaves pressed against the stems, and flowers with rust-coloured scales on the pedicel. It is only known from the type specimen.

== Description ==
Phebalium appressum is a rounded shrub that typically grows to a height of 1 m (3 ft 3 in) and is more or less covered with silvery scales. The leaves are sessile, crowded, egg-shaped to heart-shaped, about 2 mm (0.079 in) long and 1.5 mm (0.059 in) wide and pressed against the branch. The flowers are white and borne singly or in pairs on the ends of branchlets. The pedicels are about 1 mm (0.039 in) long, thick and densely covered with rust-coloured scales. The sepals are about 1.5 mm (0.059 in) long and joined at the base and covered with rust-coloured scales on the outside. Flowering occurs in July.

== Taxonomy and naming ==
Phebalium appressum was first formally described in 1998 by Paul Wilson in the journal Nuytsia from a specimen collected north of Coolgardie in 1991.

== Distribution and habitat ==
This phebalium grows on yellow sandplain and is only known from north of Coolgardie.

== Conservation status ==
Phebalium appressum is classified as "Priority One" by the Government of Western Australia Department of Parks and Wildlife, meaning that it is known from only one or a few locations which are potentially at risk.
