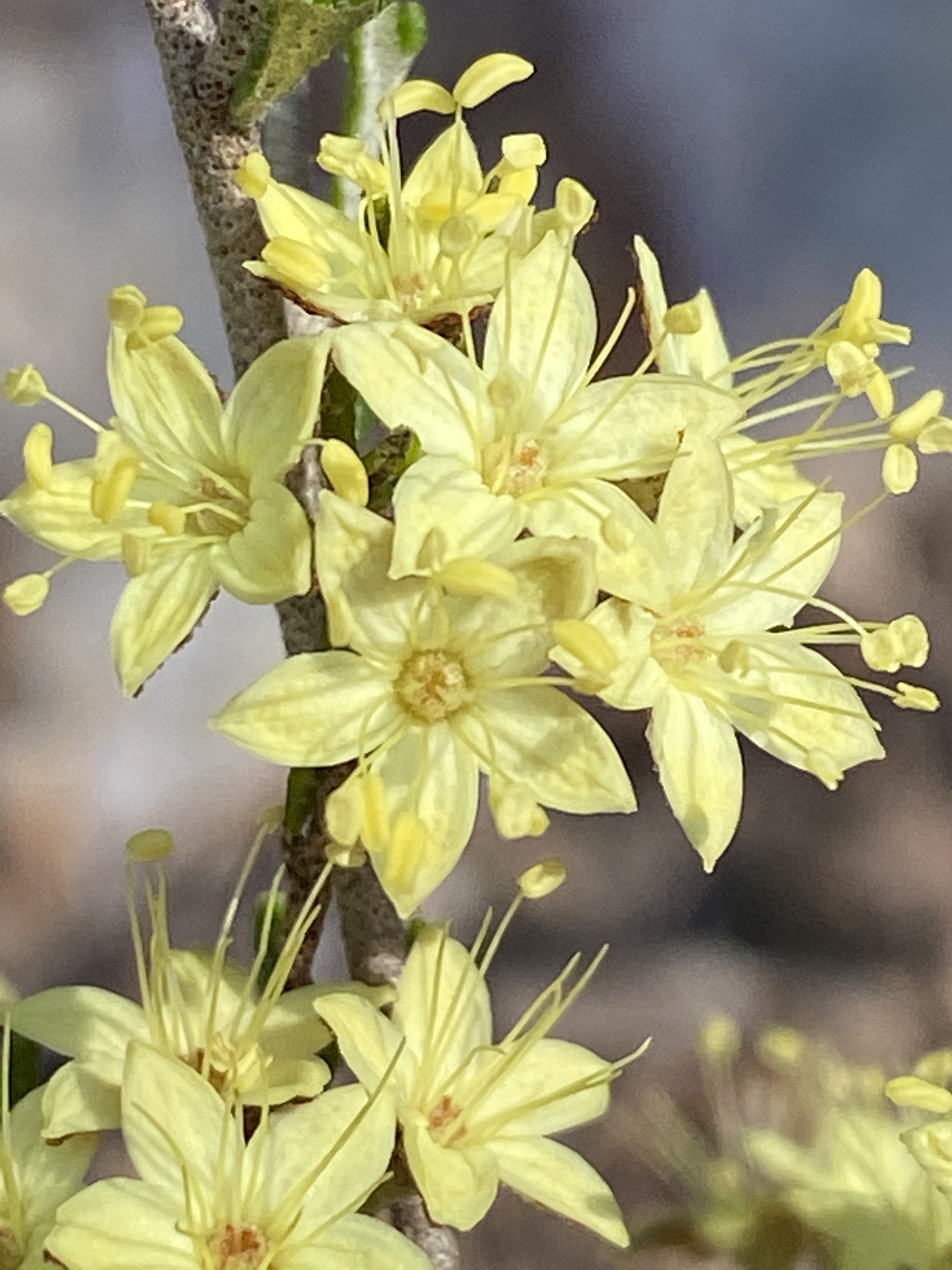

Scientific classification
- Kingdom: Plantae
- Clade: Tracheophytes
- Clade: Angiosperms
- Clade: Eudicots
- Clade: Rosids
- Order: Sapindales
- Family: Rutaceae
- Genus: Phebalium
- Species: P. bifidum

Binomial name
- Phebalium bifidum P.H.Weston & M.J.Turton

= Phebalium bifidum =

Species of shrub

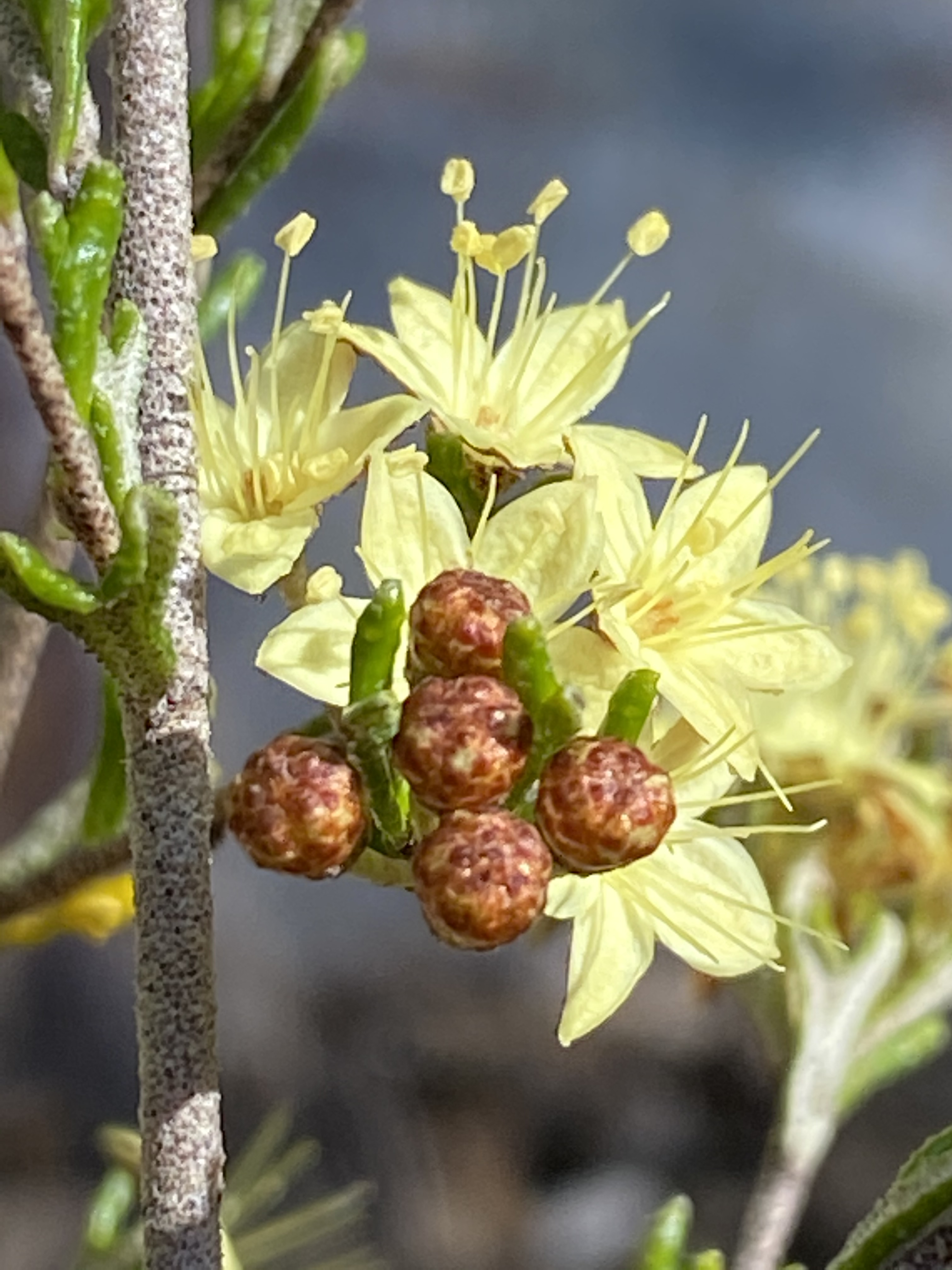
Phebalium bifidum flower buds

Phebalium bifidum is a species of small, erect shrub that is endemic to the Capertee Valley in New South Wales. It is more or less covered with glossy scales and has bilobed leaves and cream-coloured to bright yellow flowers arranged in umbels on the ends of branchlets.

== Description ==
Phebalium bifidum is an erect shrub that typically grows to a height of 0.2–1.5 m (7.9 in – 4 ft 11.1 in) and is more or less covered with glossy, grey to rust-coloured scales. Its adult leaves are Y-shaped, 3.5–14 mm (0.14–0.55 in) long on a petiole 0.31 mm (0.012 in) long. The flowers are cream-coloured to bright yellow and arranged in sessile umbels on the ends of branchlets, each flower on a pedicel about 0.5 mm (0.020 in) long. The sepals are joined to form a cup-shaped calyx about 0.5–1.5 mm (0.020–0.059 in) long and 2.0–2.5 mm (0.079–0.098 in) wide, densely covered with on the outside. The petals are more or less elliptical, 3.0–3.5 mm (0.12–0.14 in) long and 1.4–1.8 mm (0.055–0.071 in) wide and scaly on the outside. Flowering occurs from August to October.

== Taxonomy and naming ==
Phebalium bifidum was first formally described in 2004 by Peter Weston and Margaret Turton in the journal Telopea from specimens collected in the Capertee Valley in 2003.

== Distribution and habitat ==
This phebalium grows in woodland and heath. It is only known from the Capertee Valley.

== Conservation status ==
Phebalium bifidum is classified as "endangered" under the New South Wales Government Biodiversity Conservation Act 2016.
