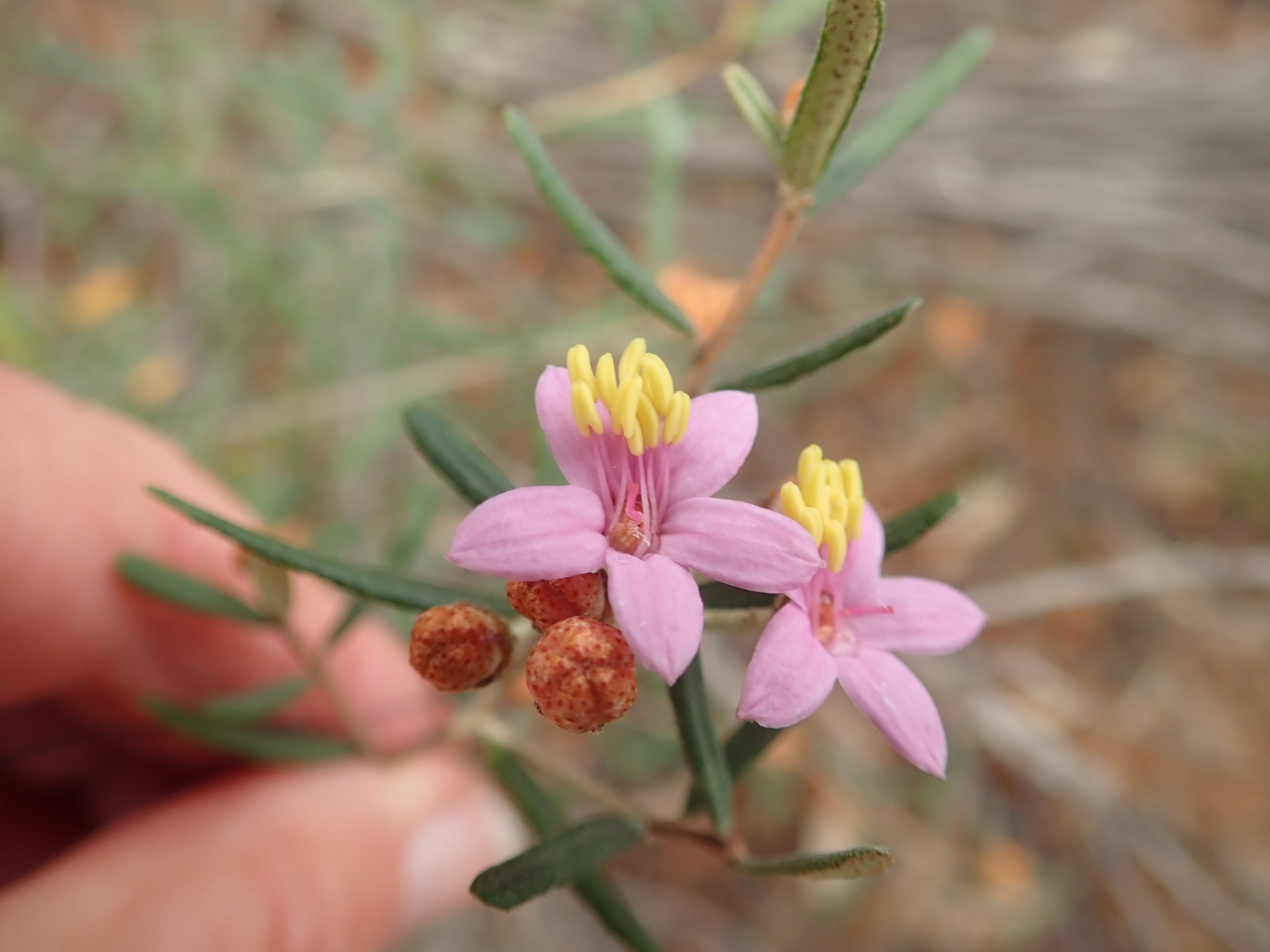

Scientific classification
- Kingdom: Plantae
- Clade: Tracheophytes
- Clade: Angiosperms
- Clade: Eudicots
- Clade: Rosids
- Order: Sapindales
- Family: Rutaceae
- Genus: Phebalium
- Species: P. nottii

Binomial name
- Phebalium nottii (F.Muell.) Maiden & Betche

Synonyms
- Eriostemon nottii Benth.; Crowea nottii (F.Muell.) Baill.

= Phebalium nottii =

Pink phebalium

Species of shrub

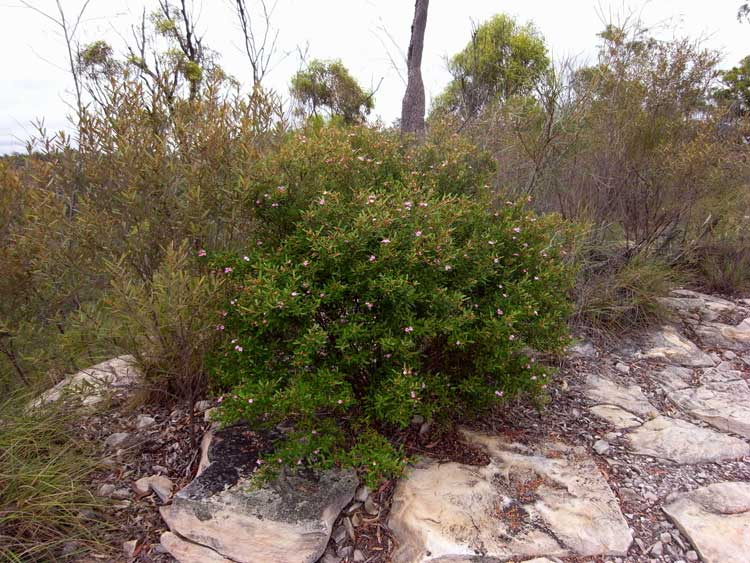
Habit in Isla Gorge National Park

Phebalium nottii, commonly known as pink phebalium, is a species of shrub that is endemic to eastern Australia. It has branchlets with silvery scales, oblong to elliptical leaves, deep pink to mauve flowers arranged in umbels of up to six, with the stamens distinctively offset to one side of the flower.

== Description ==
Phebalium nottii is a shrub that typically grows to a height of 1–3 m (3 ft 3 in – 9 ft 10 in) and has branchlets covered with silvery to rusty-coloured scales. The leaves are thin, oblong to elliptical, 20–50 mm (0.79–1.97 in) long and 4–13 mm (0.16–0.51 in) wide on a petiole 2–4 mm (0.079–0.157 in) long. The upper surface of the leaves is smooth and glabrous, the lower surface covered with silvery scales. The flowers are pink to deep mauve and arranged in umbels of up to six flowers, each flower on a pedicel 2–5 mm (0.079–0.197 in) long. The calyx is cup-shaped, 5–8 mm (0.20–0.31 in) long and 5–6 mm (0.20–0.24 in) wide, covered with silvery to rust-coloured scales inside and out. The petals are narrow egg-shaped to spatula-shaped, 8–12 mm (0.31–0.47 in) long and 3–4 mm (0.12–0.16 in) wide with the stamens, which have bright yellow anthers, distinctively offset to one side. Flowering occurs in spring.

== Taxonomy and naming ==
This species was first formally described and named as Eriostemon nottii by Ferdinand von Mueller in Fragmenta Phytographiae Australiae in 1867. In 1899 Joseph Maiden and Ernst Betche changed the name to Phebalium nottii, publishing the change in the Proceedings of the Linnean Society of New South Wales. The specific epithet honours "Dr. Nott, of Gawler".

== Distribution and habitat ==
Phebalium nottii grows on sandstone in forest and occurs in inland Queensland and in the Grafton and Coonamble-Peak Hill districts in New South Wales.
