= Phebalium brevifolium =

Scientific classification
- Kingdom: Plantae
- Clade: Tracheophytes
- Clade: Angiosperms
- Clade: Eudicots
- Clade: Rosids
- Order: Sapindales
- Family: Rutaceae
- Genus: Phebalium
- Species: P. brevifolium

Binomial name
- Phebalium brevifolium Paul G.Wilson

Synonyms
- Phebalium tuberculosum (F.Muell.) Benth.

Species of shrub

Phebalium brevifolium is a species of small shrub that is endemic to Western Australia. It has warty branchlets, sessile, wedge-shaped leaves and up to three white flowers arranged in umbels.

== Description ==
Phebalium brevifolium is a shrub that typically grows to a height of about 0.7 m (2 ft 4 in). It has warty branchlets and sessile, wedge-shaped leaves about 2 mm (0.079 in) long and 1.5 mm (0.059 in) wide with the narrower end towards the base. Up to three white flowers are arranged in umbels, each flower on a pedicel 2–3 mm (0.079–0.118 in) long. The calyx is about 2.5 mm (0.098 in) long, warty and covered with scales and star-shaped hairs on the outside and with rust-coloured scales inside. The petals are egg-shaped, 6–7 mm (0.24–0.28 in) long and about 2.5 mm (0.098 in) wide, covered with rust-coloured scales on the back. Flowering occurs from September to November.

== Taxonomy and naming ==
This species was first formally described in 1970 by Paul Wilson in the journal Nuytsia from specimens collected near Queen Victoria Spring in the Great Victoria Desert by Richard Helms in 1891. Wilson gave it the name Phebalium tuberculosum subsp. brachyphyllum and published the description in the journal Nuytsia. In a later volume of Nuytsia, Wilson raised it to species status as P. brevifolium.

== Distribution and habitat ==
Phebalium brevifolium grows on undulating sandplain and is only known from near Cundeelee and Queen Victoria Spring.

== Conservation status ==
This phebalium is classified as "not threatened" by the Western Australian Government Department of Parks and Wildlife.
