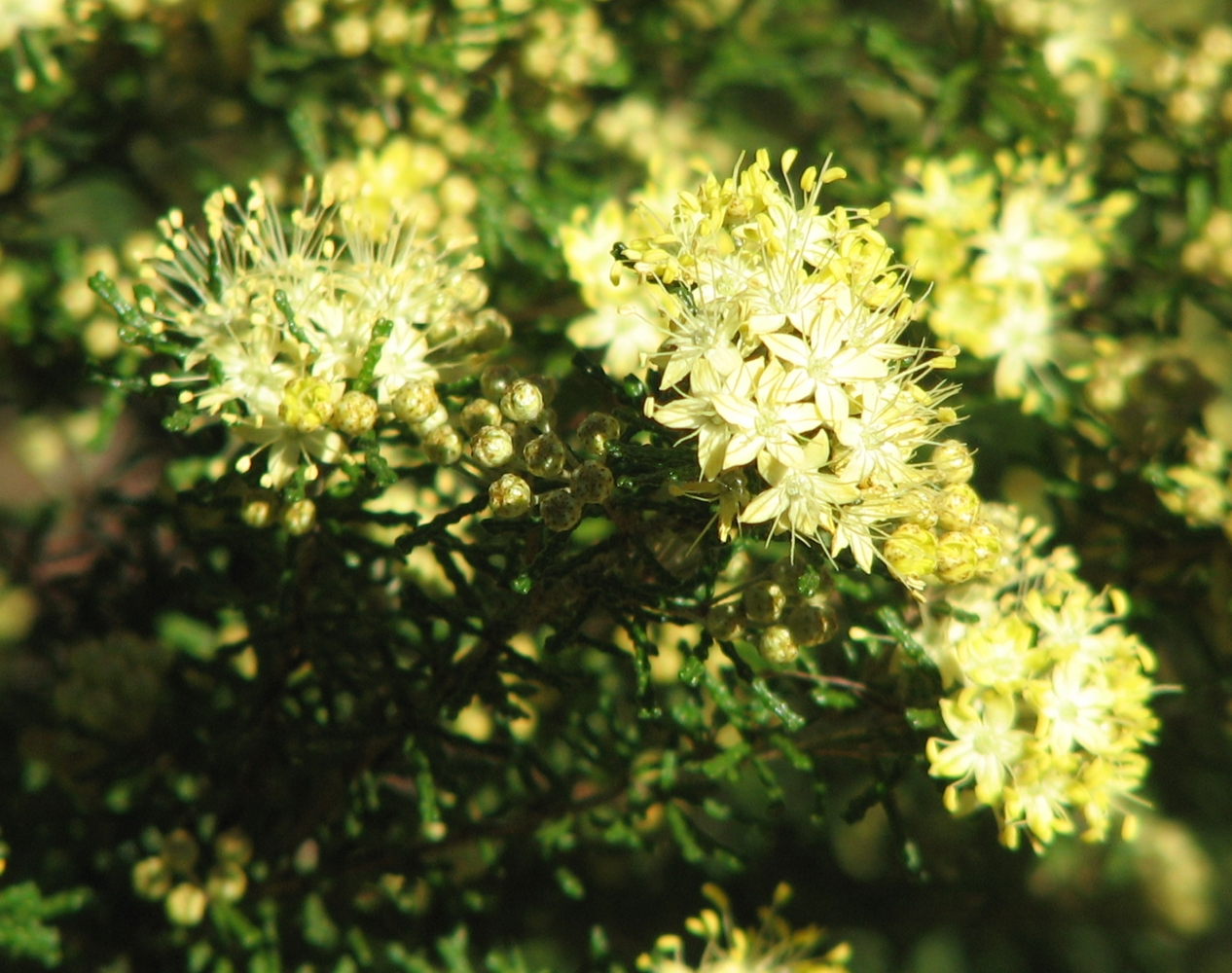

Scientific classification
- Kingdom: Plantae
- Clade: Tracheophytes
- Clade: Angiosperms
- Clade: Eudicots
- Clade: Rosids
- Order: Sapindales
- Family: Rutaceae
- Genus: Phebalium
- Species: P. bullatum

Binomial name
- Phebalium bullatum J.M.Black

Synonyms
- Phebalium glandulosum var. bullatum (J.M.Black) Court

= Phebalium bullatum =

Silvery phebalium

Species of plant

Phebalium bullatum, commonly known as silvery phebalium, desert phebalium or sand phebalium, is a species of shrub that is endemic to southern continental Australia. It is more or less covered with silvery scales and has narrow oblong to narrow wedge-shaped leaves and yellow flowers in umbels of about six.

== Description ==
Phebalium bullatum is a shrub that typically grows to a height of 2 m (6 ft 7 in) and is more or less covered with silvery scales. The branchlets are also covered with warty glands. The leaves are thick, narrow oblong to narrow wedge-shaped, 6–12 mm (0.24–0.47 in) long, 1.5–2 mm (0.059–0.079 in) wide on a short petiole and V-shaped in cross-section. The upper surface of the leaves is glabrous and channelled, the lower surface convex and covered with silvery scales. The flowers are yellow and arranged in umbels of about six, each flower on a pedicel about 5 mm (0.20 in) long. The calyx is hemispherical, about 1.5 mm (0.059 in) long with broad triangular teeth and the petals are broadly elliptical, about 3 mm (0.12 in) long and 2 mm (0.079 in) wide with silvery scales on the back. Flowering occurs from August to October.

== Taxonomy ==
Phebalium bullatum was first formally described in 1916 by John McConnell Black and the description was published in Transactions and proceedings of the Royal Society of South Australia.

== Distribution and habitat ==
Silvery phebalium is found on sandy soils in mallee scrub between the Eyre Peninsula in South Australia and north-western Victoria.
