= Allan State School =

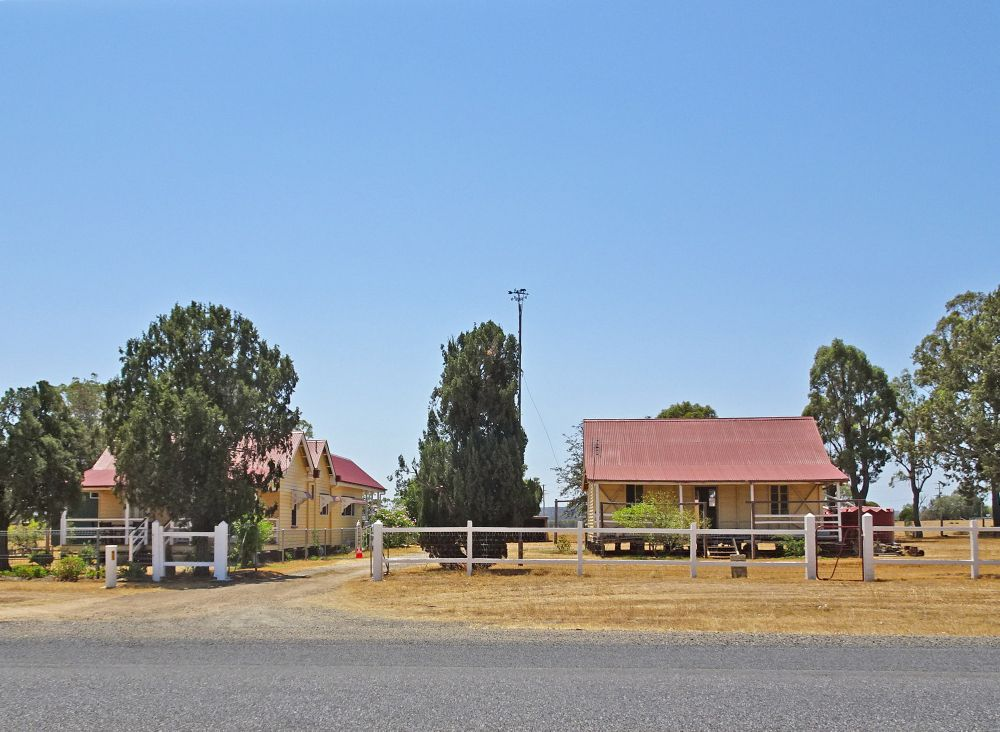
- Teacher's residence (left) and school building (right), 2019

- Location within Queensland
- 28.1863°S 151.9525°E
- Location: 280 Sandy Creek Road, Allan, Southern Downs Region, Queensland, Australia

History
- Design period: 1870s–1890s (Late 19th century)
- Built: 1872–1886, Suter Teaching Building (1872, 1872–1886, Suter Teachers Residence (1872, 1872–2019, Remnants of tennis court, swing, 1872–2019, Landscape features, including: playing field, early fence posts, 1954

Site notes
- Architect(s): Department of Public Works (Queensland); Richard George Suter

Queensland Heritage Register
- Official name: Allan State School (former)
- Type: state heritage
- Designated: 3 May 2019
- Reference no.: 650092
- Type: Education, Research, Scientific Facility: School – provisional; Education, Research, Scientific Facility: School – state (primary); Education, research, scientific facility: School-state
- Theme: Educating Queenslanders: Providing primary schooling

Allan State School is a heritage-listed former state school and teacher's residence at 280 Sandy Creek Road, Allan, Southern Downs Region, Queensland, Australia. It was designed by Department of Public Works (Queensland) and Richard George Suter and was built from 1872 to 1886. It was added to the Queensland Heritage Register on 3 May 2019.

== History ==
The former Allan State School was originally named Sandy Creek State School and was established in 1872 on a 2-acre (0.81 ha) site. Situated approximately 8.5 kilometres (5.3 mi) WNW of Warwick, on the Darling Downs, the school retains an excellent and highly intact example of a Suter-designed school building. The teacher's residence, also Suter-designed and constructed at the same time as the school, is considered to be the only known example to survive in Queensland. Prior to the school being closed in 1967 and sold to private owners, it had been in continuous use since its establishment and was the focus for the local community as a place for important social and cultural activities.

The traditional owners of the Warwick District were the Githabal language group. Early European explorer and botanist, Allan Cunningham, first visited the Darling Downs, in 1827. Thirteen years later, grazier Patrick Leslie, with a large party, set out from Penrith, New South Wales to explore the Darling Downs. In 1840, he pioneered the first pastoral runs on the Downs, Toolburra and Canning Downs, and established the important wool industry in the region. Agriculture was also introduced to Sandy Creek in this era when closer settlement began, and a small, but thriving, farming community emerged. Crops such as wheat, maize and lucerne were grown on Sandy Creek's farms. There was also a fledgling dairy industry by the 1870s and an extensive vineyard, Assmanshausen Winery which had been established by early German settlers, the Kircher family.

By 1869 there were almost 200 people residing in the Sandy Creek district including families with small children. The closest schools were in Warwick, a considerable distance for a child to travel each day. To overcome this problem, the community made a request to the government for a school, "if there was a school established here it would not only offer a chance for educating our little ones, but we might retain their services at home, which are found to be so valuable on a farm, both in the early morning and after school hours at night". Sandy Creek farmer, Michael McKone, donated 2 acres (0.81 ha) of his 37 acres (15 ha) property for the school, with frontage to the road to Sandy Creek from Warwick (now called Sandy Creek Road). McKone and other community members donated funds to assist with the construction of a school.

The request was successful, and in November 1871 tenders were called for the construction of a school and teacher's residence for Sandy Creek. The successful contractors were Warwick carpentry partnership, William Wallace and William Marshall who were to "perform, execute and complete all the works required in erecting and finishing a school house and teacher's residence at Sandy Creek in accordance with certain plans and specifications prepared for the purpose by Richard George Suter of Brisbane, Architect, and to provide furniture and also a tank and pump for the same".

The establishment of schools was considered an essential step in the development of early communities and integral to their success. Following the introduction of the Education Act 1860, which established the Board of General Education and began standardising curriculum, training and facilities, Queensland's national and public schools grew from four in 1860 to 230 by 1875. Locals often donated land and labour for a school's construction and the school community contributed to maintenance and development. Schools became a community focus, a symbol of progress, and a source of pride, with enduring connections formed with past pupils, parents, and teachers.

Suter was a private architect commissioned from 1865 by the Board of General Education to design school buildings. After 1868, Suter was responsible for most of the Board's buildings until 1875. In his timber school designs, Suter incorporated an "outside studding" - construction technique whereby a building with timber stud framing was clad only internally, creating a distinctive exterior of exposed framing similar in appearance to half-timbered construction. Suter recognised that in a relatively mild climate a timber wall essentially half an inch thick would provide adequate enclosure and permit quick dissipation of interior heat. To achieve architectural pretension, the hardwood frame and softwood linings were stained and oil finished in different colours and diagonal or crossed bracing members were introduced not only for structural integrity but for expressive and decorative effect. Suter is credited with being the first to use this technique in Queensland. Outside studding for school architecture was continued by Suter's successors for another 50 years and the technique was transmitted throughout the colony, becoming popular and used in countless non-education buildings. As an architect in the early years of the colony, Suter was prolific despite only practicing for approximately 10 years in Queensland and had a strong influence on the establishment of Queensland architecture. Suter's standard designs were widely used by the government as an easy way to provide education facilities in the face of limited budgets and a growing population. The reuse of designs diminished the need to pay Suter additional architectural fees and the relationship between Suter and the government became strained. Suter continued as approved architect until 1875 when he was replaced.

Although Suter's Brisbane school buildings were of brick construction, in rural areas Suter designed timber-framed school buildings. Initially, his designs were simple, lowset, structures with gable roofs, rectangular in plan with a small porch. When first built, the Sandy Creek school (Allan State School) was a one-room timber school, with externally exposed timber framing, hardwood shingle roof, and small entrance porch facing the road, with no verandahs or rear door.

Most Queensland state schools incorporated a teacher's residence on the site, particularly in rural areas. In Australia, only Queensland offered free accommodation to teachers, the government policy applying to male teachers (only) from as early as 1864. This was partial recompense for a low wage, an incentive for teacher recruitment in rural areas and provided onsite caretakers. From the outset, teachers' residences were built to standards regulated by the Board of General Education rather than to specific designs which varied according to the architects responsible. These residences were similar to the vernacular Queensland house with few, if any, education-specific requirements or features.

Residences designed by the Department of Public Works' architects, and constructed to the high standard demanded by the state, were typically of a higher-quality in design, materials and construction than most similarly scaled private residences. The detached teacher's residence was located within the school grounds at a distance from the teaching buildings, usually with a separate, fenced yard with gardens and trees. The teacher's residence at Sandy Creek was built to the west of the school and originally shared the same distance from the front boundary as the school. When first built, it was a small timber two-room house with rear kitchen, including fireplace, a hardwood shingle roof and front verandah.

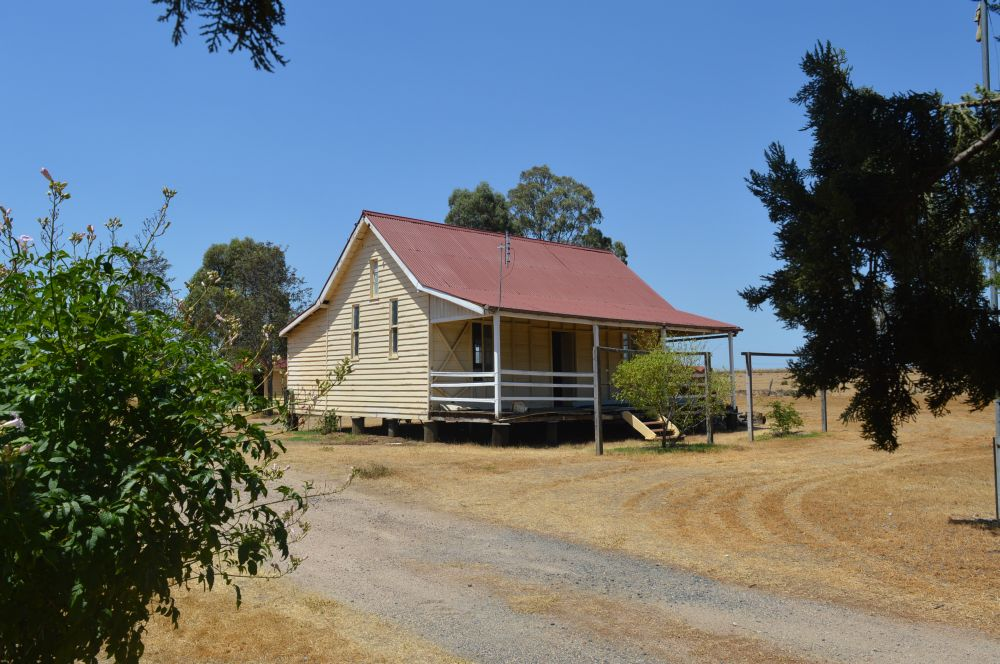
School building, 2019

The school was opened on 13 May 1872 with an enrolment of 24 students. Both buildings had cost £304 to construct. In December 1872 tenders were called for the construction of a fence around the playground and a fireplace for the teacher's residence. In October 1873 it was recorded that 41 children were on the roll. By 1878 this increased to 60 children and the school inspector reported "the pupils are clean, pretty steady and attentive, well-behaved and docile". The paddock west of the residence became the playing field with a cricket pitch, netball hoop and shed and enclosure added at a later date.

Despite the general acceptance of Suter's designs, they did receive some criticism from school inspectors, particularly the exposed studding, as many schools had to be clad externally later or have verandahs added to protect the walls. Hand basins were rarely supplied in rural schools, a much criticised design flaw. A rear door leading to the verandah was not provided, requiring one to be cut later. Suter's design was also criticised as being uniformly defective in ventilation. Inspector John Anderson complained in 1875 of the ventilation quality and suggested new techniques. Inspector AJ Boyd was critical of the lack of appreciation of tropical requirements, claiming that all school buildings were designed for cold climates.

Some of these problems were addressed when Suter introduced an "improved plan" of his school building and teachers' residence designs in 1873. The "improved plan" added front and rear verandahs, which provided hat rooms and additional play and classroom space to the teaching buildings. This began a distinctive design solution of "classroom and verandah" that continued through evolution until at least the 1960s. Other problems with Suter designs would be addressed in subsequent designs by other Department of Public Works architects, and typically, existing Suter buildings were altered to provide better internal conditions.

As the original design of the Sandy Creek school had not included a verandah, it became apparent that one was required to help reduce the heat during the summer months, give protection to the children from the sun and wind, and improve light and ventilation. In 1878 the school inspector reported to the Colonial Architect's Office that the school "has a porch in front of the school which must be taken down ... there is no door to the back of the building". Additions recommended were for the construction of front and rear verandahs and the inclusion of a back door. This work, however, did not take place at this time and in 1883 the school committee made a request to the Department of Public Instruction (the department) for the construction of verandahs and stated that "we were now prepared to contribute our share towards their erection". It was not until 1886, however, following further requests from the school committee that the improvements were carried out and tenders were called. Subsequently, the front porch was removed and front and rear verandas with timber balustrades and stairs were built. A door was also introduced to the back verandah. By 1878 the school was known as the Sandy Creek State School.

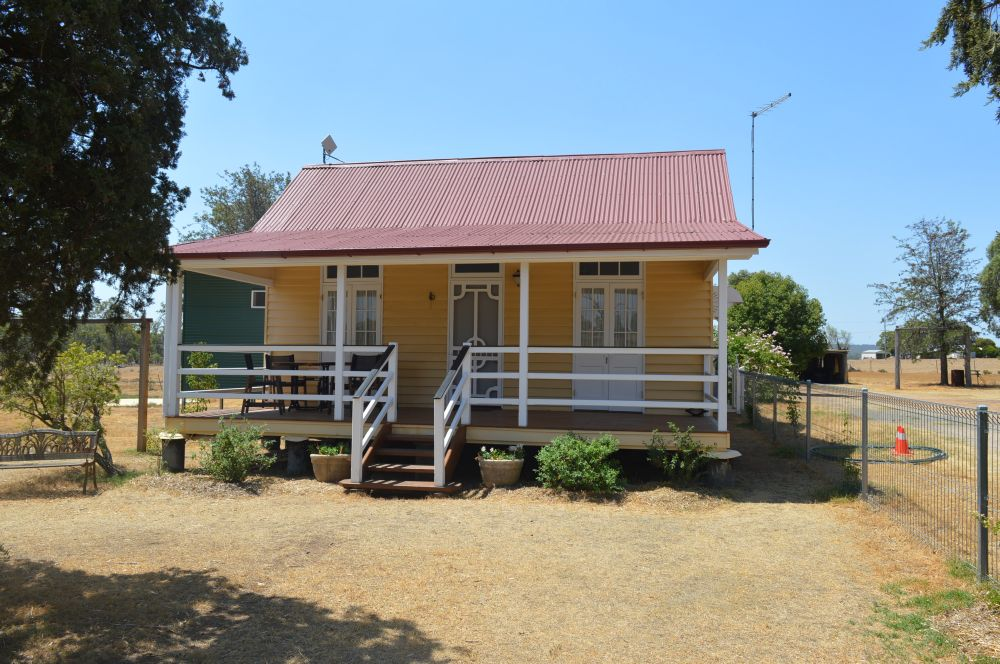
Teacher's residence (front), 2019

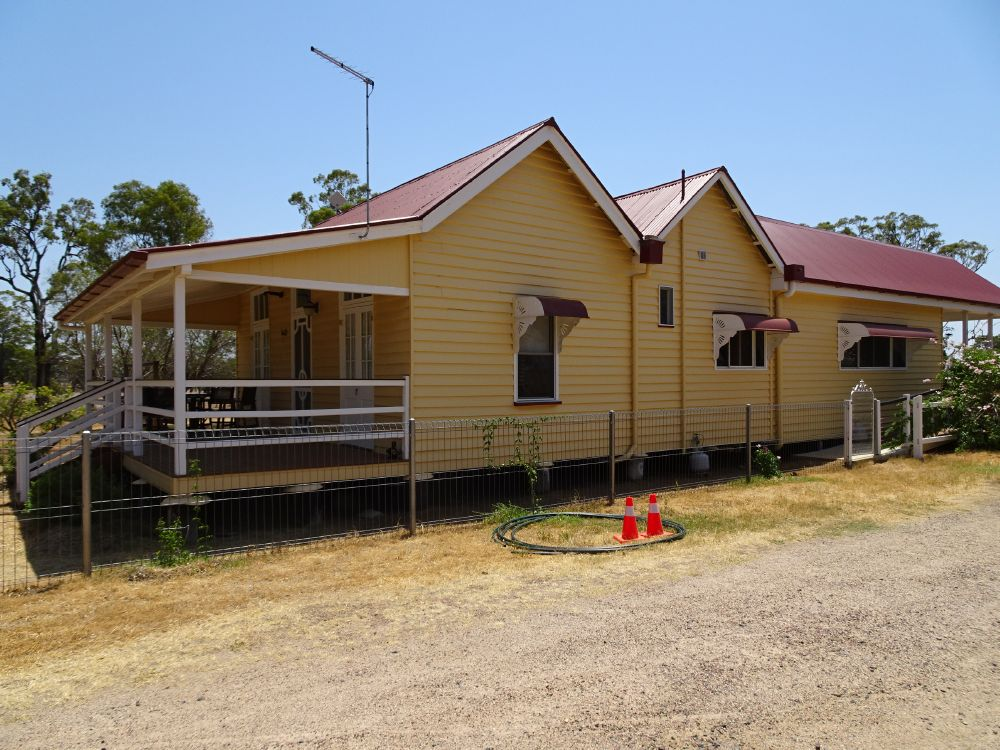
Teacher's residence (side view), 2019

In 1885 the school committee requested additions to the teacher's residence for the construction of two new rooms. The committee had been successful in raising £21 to contribute to the cost of the extensions. This, and the addition of a new chimney had been completed by June 1886. The two new rooms were added to the front of the residence, with the original two rooms becoming the rear gabled section of the building. The front verandah was shifted from the original section to the front of the new addition. In 1896 both the school building and residence had their roofs sheeted with corrugated iron. In 1930 the teaching building's timber floor, which was in great need of repair, was replaced.

Sandy Creek remained a bustling agricultural centre in the late nineteenth century with three hotels. In 1899 a small, timber Anglican Church, St Matthews, was constructed adjacent to the school. When the South-Western railway line was extended from Warwick to Goondiwindi in 1904, a railway siding was built to Sandy Creek. It was, however, named Allan railway station rather than Sandy Creek. Its namesake was William Allan (1840–1901), successful Sandy Creek district pastoralist and well-respected Parliamentarian. In 1917 a community hall, the Allies Hall, was constructed in Sandy Creek which became the centre for social activities in the district for several decades. The hall is no longer extant.

In 1929, at the request of the school committee, the department approved the school's named change from Sandy Creek to Allan. Prior to this, the school committee expressed their concerns to the department in relation to the school's name; "Sandy Creek" was often confused with other districts of the same name, causing mail delays, and as the railway station was called Allan, the school should be also.

Arbor Day had been an important event in the school calendar at Allan State School. Arbor Day celebrations began in Queensland in 1890. Aesthetically designed gardens were encouraged by regional inspectors, and educators believed gardening and Arbor Days instilled in young minds the value of hard work and activity, improved classroom discipline, developed aesthetic tastes, and inspired people to stay on the land. In September 1928, the curator of the Brisbane Botanic Gardens, Ernest Walter Bick, supplied six trees for Allan State School, at the request of the head teacher, Austin Corcoran, for that year's Arbor Day celebrations. Continuing with the tradition, in September 1948, it was reported in the Warwick Daily News several trees had been planted at the school for that year's Arbor Day, and one was planted by an original Sandy Creek pupil, Mr Dippelsman, aged 76. The mature silky oak tree (Grevillea robusta) situated behind the teacher's residence may be an Arbor Day planting.

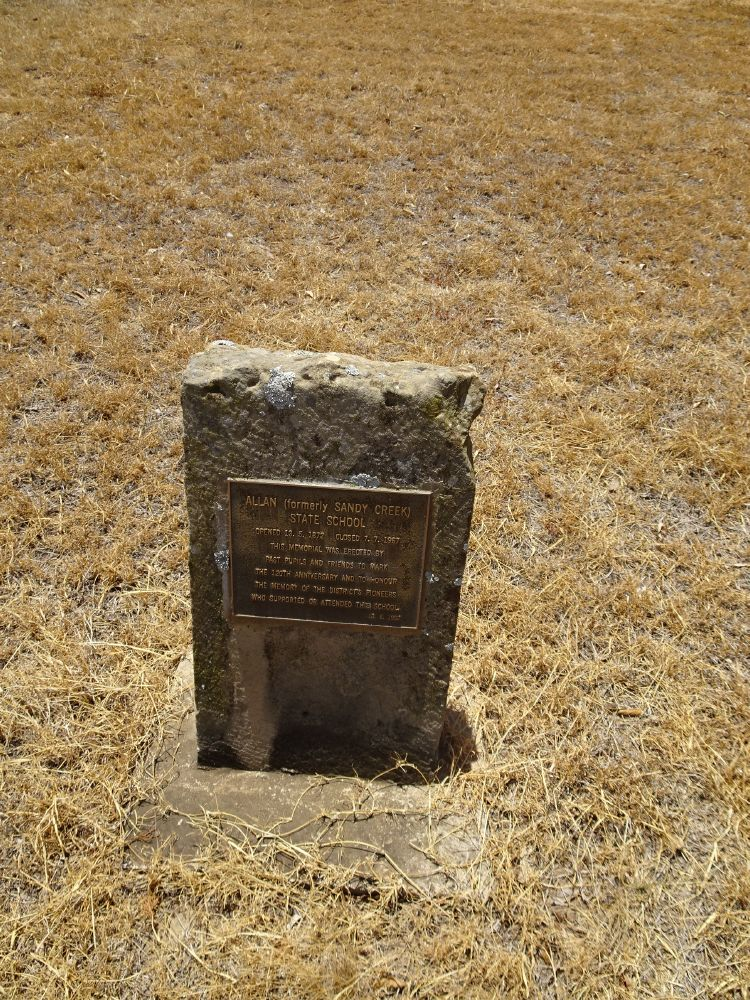
120th anniversary plaque,2019

A major event in the history of the school was the celebration of its Diamond Jubilee in May 1932. It was reported in several newspapers at the time, including the Warwick Daily News and The Queenslander that it was attended by up to 400 people, 200 of which were past pupils. A souvenir booklet, outlining the history of the school and listing past teachers and pupils was distributed to all who attended. The celebrations included a luncheon held in a marquee erected for the occasion at the school, a picnic, sports program and an evening ball in the Allies Hall. The school building itself was described at the time, "the original school building, to which verandahs and a porch only have been added since its erection 60 years ago". Dignitaries, such as the Mayor of Warwick attended and photographs of past and present pupils were taken at the front of the school. Subsequent celebrations were held at the school in 1947 for the school's 75th anniversary and in 1951 for its 79th anniversary. In 1992, the 120 year anniversary of the school was celebrated, and commemorated with a history booklet and a commemorative plaque placed at the front of the school, which lists its opening and closing dates.

In 1954 a playshed was built in the school grounds. This followed several requests from the school committee to the department from the 1930s to the 1950s. The Queensland education system recognised the importance of play in the school curriculum and, as school sites were typically cleared of all vegetation, the provision of all-weather outdoor space was needed. Playsheds were designed as free-standing shelters, with fixed timber seating between posts and earth or decomposed granite floors that provided covered play space and doubled as teaching space when required. These structures were timber-framed and generally open sided, although some were partially enclosed with timber boards or corrugated galvanised iron sheets. Playsheds were a typical addition to state schools across Queensland between c. 1880s and the 1950s, although less frequently constructed after c. 1909, with the introduction of highset school buildings with understorey play areas. Built to standard designs, playsheds ranged in size relative to student numbers. One year after its construction, the Allan State School playshed was enclosed to protect the children from the strong westerly winds in the winter months.

In 1956 electricity was installed in the school building and the residence. In 1960 alterations were made to the residence when the front verandah was enclosed, providing an extra two rooms. In 2017 this was reopened and elements including the balustrade and verandah posts were reconstructed. Other than that, very little change has occurred.

By the 1960s enrolment numbers had dropped to fewer than 26 pupils and in 1966 there were only 11 students attending. The department reported that "consideration is at present being given to the possibility of the closure of the Allan State School as a result of transport of children to a Warwick school". In 1967 the school was closed and the following year the property was sold into private ownership and was subsequently established as a farm.

In 2017, the former Allan State School changed ownership and during that year, renovations were undertaken to the Suter teacher's residence. These renovations included a gable-roofed extension to the southeast of the rear annexe, and an addition to the northwest side of the building. The bathroom was converted into a hallway, and the kitchen to a bedroom; and a new kitchen and pantry was installed. The dividing wall between the 1886 addition's rooms was removed, with bulkhead retained. Most wall and ceiling linings were plastered, except for a beaded board ceiling to the 1886 addition's rooms. A c. 1952 enclosure of the front verandah was re-opened, and the verandah was largely reconstructed to the early detailing. The following year, in 2018, the Suter teaching building was re-levelled, with original timber stumps retained where viable.

In 2019 there were only three Suter-designed timber teaching buildings entered in the Queensland Heritage Register: Waterford State School, Mutdapilly State School and Morayfield State School. The teacher's residence is the only known surviving Suter-designed teacher's residence in Queensland.

The school site has changed little since the school was first established in the 1870s. In 2019 it remains in private ownership, the house is used as a private residence, and the teaching building is used as an office. The former school evokes a sense of the past and is a reminder of the way generations of Allan State School children went to school. Operating from 1872 to 1967, Allan State School, has played an important role in the Allan district. Generations of students have been taught there and many social events held at the school since its establishment.

State Library of Queensland holds Sandy Creek State School and Allan community records in their collection.

== Description ==
The former Allan State School occupies a 8,094 square metres (2.000 acres) largely flat site in the locality of Allan (formerly known as Sandy Creek), approximately 8.5 kilometres (5.3 mi) WNW of Warwick in the Darling Downs. Fronting and accessed by Sandy Creek Road to the southwest, the site is bounded on all other sides by agricultural properties. Now a residential property, the place retains a complex of former school buildings and structures, remnants of play equipment and spaces, and landscape elements.

The features of heritage significance within the complex are:

- a 1872 Suter teaching building, including 1886 addition of verandahs
- a 1872 Suter teacher's residence, including 1887 addition
- a 1954 playshed
- an early shed and enclosure
- landscape features and remnants of school play equipment including a swing set, netball hoop, tennis court, playing field, early fence posts, and a mature tree

Most of the buildings and structures are located at the southeast end of the site, with the playing field forming the western portion of the site and the shed and enclosure standing in the northwest corner. The Suter teaching building and the Suter teacher's residence are aligned parallel to and facing Sandy Creek Road to the southwest. North of the school buildings, the playshed stands adjacent to the former tennis court. The grounds are divided by fences into sections: the school to the east, the residence yard in the centre, and the playing field to the west.

=== Suter teaching building (1872, extended 1886) ===
The Suter teaching building is a highly-intact, lowset, timber classroom building (former), sheltered by a steeply pitched gable roof with a broken-back over front (southwest) and rear (northeast) verandahs. Accessed via central stairs, the verandahs are largely open, with the rear verandah semi-enclosed at each end.

The interior comprises a single classroom (former), accessed by central doors from the front and rear verandahs.

=== Suter teacher's residence (1872, extended 1886 and 2017) ===
The Suter teacher's residence is a lowset, timber residence that has an open verandah to the front (southwest), an annexe and a 2017 addition to the rear (northeast), and a mostly detached 2017 extension to the side (northwest). The building has a dual-gable roof, with a broken back over the front verandah, and perpendicular gables over the rear annexe and addition.

=== Playshed (1954) ===
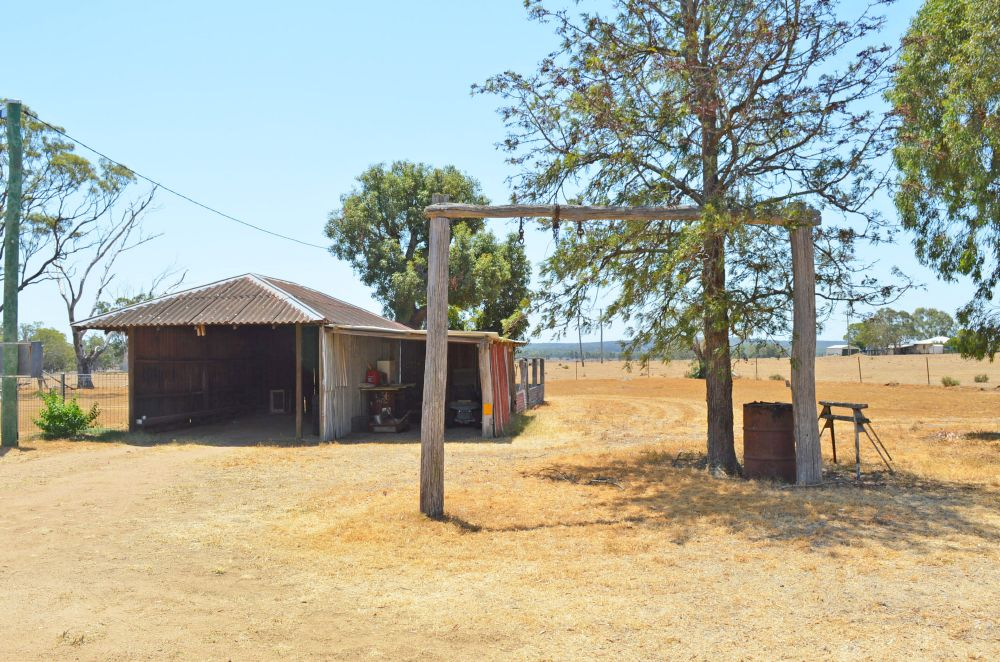
Playshed and swing, 2019

The playshed is a 6-post, timber-framed, rectangular sheltered play space. It has a corrugated cement sheet-clad hip roof, and the roof framing is exposed to the interior.

=== Landscape features and play equipment ===
The Suter teaching building and Suter teacher's residence are highly visible and prominent features of Sandy Creek Road. With vistas from the road across an open front lawn, the buildings read as a pair, set within a rural landscape.

The playing field, located directly south of the shed and enclosure, is an open grassed area, separated from the former school buildings by a fence.

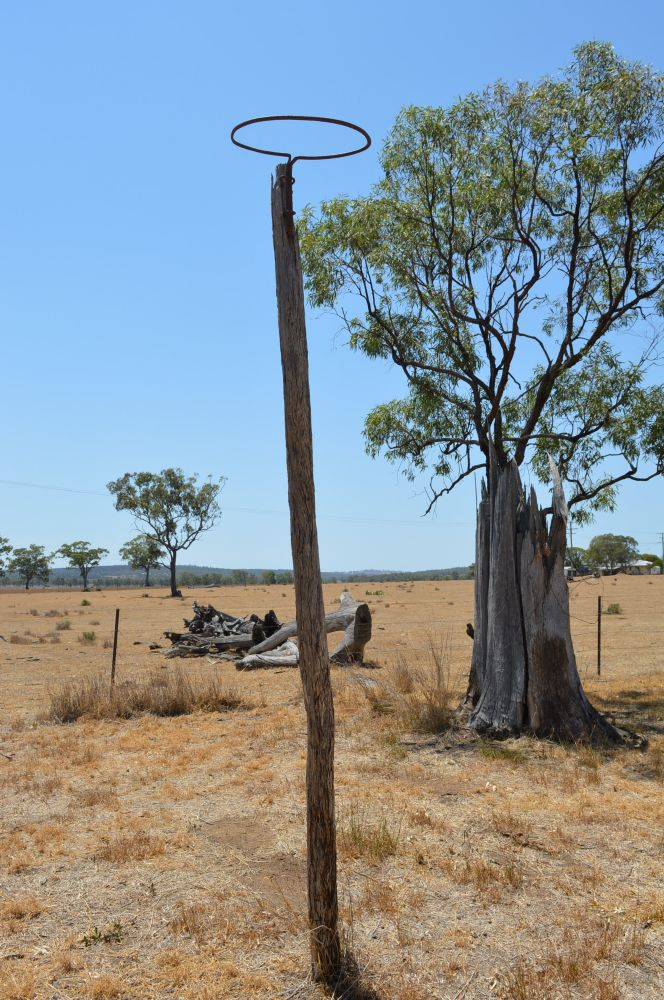
Netball hoop, 2019

An early netball hoop is located at the north end of the playing field. It comprises a roughly-hewn timber post, with a metal hoop fixed to the top.

The timber frame of an early swing is located between the Suter teaching building and playshed. The framing includes two tall, roughly-hewn timber posts connected with a timber beam. Some early metal fixings and chains are attached to the beam.

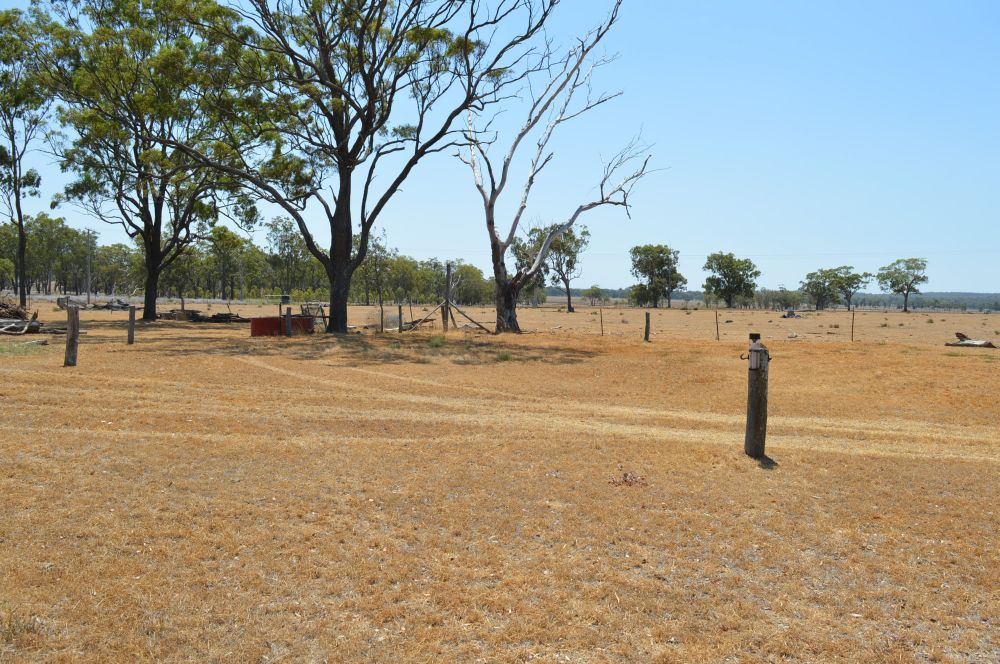
Tennis court posts, 2019

Remnants of the tennis court include two timber net posts, with metal hooks. The extent of the former tennis court is now grassed.

Four early timber posts along the east boundary mark the original extent of the grounds: two are located at the corners of the lot boundary, one is adjacent a chicken coop and one is near the swing set. Other early timber fence posts are along the playing field section of the Sandy Creek Road boundary. The two-rail timber fence with wire mesh along Sandy Creek Road has been reconstructed to match its c. 1929 design.

A commemorative stone (1992) is located near the entrance gate from Sandy Creek Road to the school yard, marking the 120th anniversary of the school, and its opening and closing dates.

A mature silky oak tree (Grevillea robusta) survives between the residence yard and playing field.

Sandy Creek State School and Allan community records have been placed in State Library of Queensland.

== Heritage listing ==
The former Allan State School was listed on the Queensland Heritage Register on 3 May 2019 having satisfied the following criteria.

The place is important in demonstrating the evolution or pattern of Queensland's history.

Allan State School (established in 1872 as Sandy Creek Provisional School) is important in demonstrating the evolution of state education, and its associated architecture, in Queensland. The place retains representative examples of government designs that were architectural responses to prevailing government educational philosophies and later became standard. These buildings are: a Suter teaching building (1872, extended 1886); a Suter teacher's residence (1872, extended 1886); and a playshed (1954).

The Suter teaching building and its extensions represent the early development of standard Queensland school classroom building types by the Department of Public Works architects, and the commencement of years of experimentation with light, classroom size and ventilation.

The Suter teacher's residence is important as early, representative evidence of the Queensland Government's policy to provide accommodation for married male teachers as an inducement to teach in rural areas and to provide a resident caretaker on the site.

The playshed, playing field and sporting facilities are representative of Queensland Government's recognition of the importance of play in the education of children.

Reserved for school purposes in 1872, the place demonstrates the establishment and development of closer settlement in the Warwick district, an early agricultural and pastoral area in Queensland.

The place demonstrates rare, uncommon or endangered aspects of Queensland's cultural heritage.

Highly intact, the timber Suter teaching building at Allan State School is rare as one of four known surviving intact examples of the approximately 65 buildings of this type constructed.

As a pair, the Suter teaching Building and Suter teacher's residence are rare as the only known surviving example of a Suter-designed timber school building and teacher's residence complex in Queensland, and as the earliest known surviving pair of a school building and teacher's residence built concurrently by the Queensland Government. Together the pair are exceptional, demonstrating a high degree of integrity through their retention of historical form, configuration and setting.

The place is important in demonstrating the principal characteristics of a particular class of cultural places.

The former Allan State School is important in demonstrating the principal characteristics of early Queensland state schools, including building designs by the Queensland Government, set in a generous site with play areas, sporting facilities, and a mature tree.

The Suter teaching building is an excellent, highly intact and rare example of its type, with typical early alterations for improved light and ventilation. It demonstrates the principal characteristics of a Suter teaching building, including: its lowset form with gable roof; single-skin, timber-framed construction with externally exposed studs and bracing; and single-room classroom space with narrow windows. The early alterations, including front and rear verandahs (1886), exterior cladding in timber weatherboards, and corrugated metal roof sheets, are typical modifications made to this building type following the introduction Suter's "improved plan" in 1873.

As the only known example of its type surviving in Queensland, the Suter teacher's residence is a rare example of its type, with typical and early alterations. The building demonstrates the principal characteristics of a Suter teacher's residence, through its: lowset form; interior layout comprising a core of sleeping and living spaces, with a rear kitchen annexe; and coved ceilings to interior rooms. Early modifications include: the 1886 extension for increased accommodation; weatherboard and chamferboard exterior cladding; and corrugated metal roof sheets.

The playshed is a good, intact example of a standard 6-post Department of Public Works-designed playshed. It demonstrates the principal characteristics of its type through its hipped roof with exposed timber framing; timber posts and braces; timber perimeter seats; and partially enclosed sides.

The place is important because of its aesthetic significance.

As a cohesive pair of timber buildings from the 19th century, the former Allan State School is important for its contribution to the locality and its evocative qualities.

Set back from and aligned with the adjacent road, the Suter teaching building and Suter teacher's residence possess an ordered simplicity and unified composition of scale, form and materiality; which are complemented by the rural landscape setting.

The former school buildings, largely unchanged from their 19th century form and preserved in their original configuration and setting, evoke a sense of nostalgia for the simplicity of Queensland's rural schooling experience in the past.

The place has a strong or special association with a particular community or cultural group for social, cultural or spiritual reasons.

The former Allan State School has a strong and ongoing association with past pupils, parents, staff members, and the surrounding community through sustained use from its establishment in 1872 until its closing in 1967. The place is important for its contribution to the educational development of the Sandy Creek / Allan district, with generations of children taught at the school. It has served as a prominent community focal point and gathering place for social events, with widespread community support.
