= Palgrave, Queensland =

Palgrave
- Suburb
- Interactive map of Palgrave
- Coordinates: 28.3636°S 151.7766°E
- Country: Australia
- State: Queensland
- LGA: Southern Downs Region
- Location: 33.2 km (20.6 mi) WSW of Warwick; 63.4 km (39.4 mi) N of Stanthorpe; 108 km (67 mi) S of Toowoomba; 194 km (121 mi) SW of Brisbane

Government
  - State electorate: Southern Downs
  - Federal division: Maranoa

Area
  - Total: 207.4 km^{2} (80.1 sq mi)
- Elevation: 480 to 810 m (1,570 to 2,660 ft)

Population
  - Total: 35 (2021 census)
  - Density: 0.1688/km^{2} (0.437/sq mi)
- Time zone: UTC+10:00 (AEST)
- Postcode: 4374
Suburbs around Palgrave
Greymare	Rodgers Creek	Leslie Dam
Cement Mills	Palgrave	The Glen
Goldfields	Passchendaele	Dalveen

Palgrave is a rural locality in the Southern Downs Region, Queensland, Australia. In the 2021 census, Palgrave had a population of 35 people.

== Geography ==
The Herries Range forms the south-western boundary of the locality. Sandy Creek rises on the slopes of the range and then flows northward through the locality exiting to the north-east (the locality of Leslie Dam) where it is impounded by Leslie Dam to create Lake Leslie.

The Durakai State Forest is in the west of the locality. Apart from that protected area, the land use is predominantly grazing on native vegetation with some crop growing.

== History ==
The locality takes its name from the parish name, which in turn is thought to be named after an officer of the Aberdeen Company operating several pastoral runs in the area or after a senior public servant.

Rookwood Provisional School opened circa 1888. On 1 January 1909, it became Rookwood State School. It closed circa 1929. The school presumably takes its name from the adjacent Rookwood (also written as Rook Wood) pastoral station. It was located on a 5-acre (2.0 ha) site in a bend of Sandy Creek (approx 28.27374°S 151.84877°E). This location is now the place where Sandy Creek flows into Lake Leslie, created by the Leslie Dam which did not exist during the school's lifetime.

In October 2023, a light kit-built aircraft crashed in Palgrave, killing the pilot, and starting a grass fire.

== Demographics ==
In the 2016 census, Palgrave had a population of 17 people.

In the 2021 census, Palgrave had a population of 35 people.

== Education ==
There are no schools in Palgrave. The nearest government primary schools are:

- Wheatvale State School in Wheatvale to the north
- Warwick West State School in Warwick to the north-east
- Pozieres State School in Pozieres to the south

The nearest government secondary schools are:

- Warwick State High School in Warwick to the north-east
- Stanthorpe State High School in Stanthorpe to the south
