= Allan, Queensland =

Allan
- Suburb
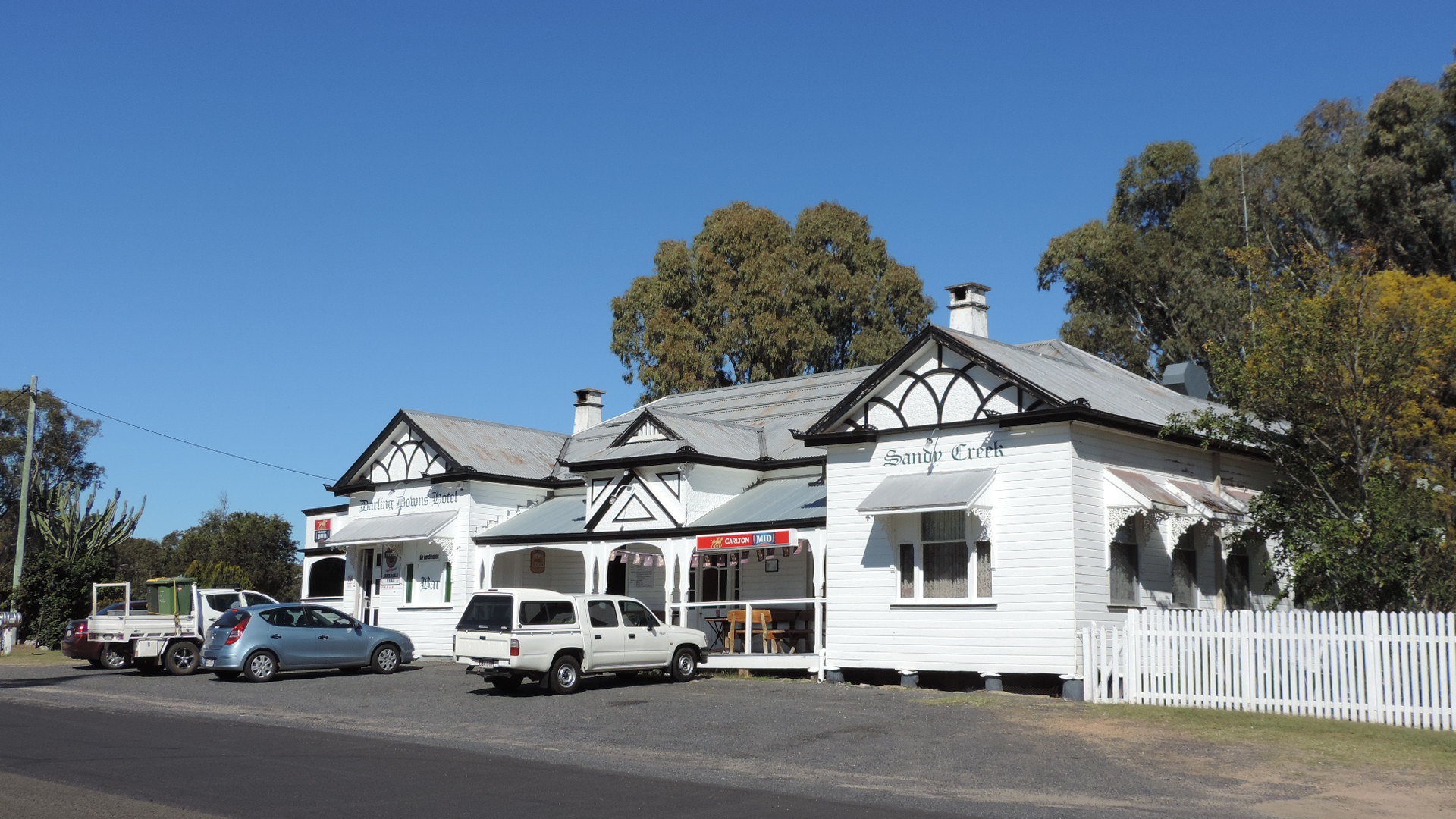
- Darling Downs Hotel erected 1920s

- Interactive map of Allan
- Coordinates: 28.1972°S 151.9502°E
- Country: Australia
- State: Queensland
- LGA: Southern Downs Region
- Location: 10.5 km (6.5 mi) WNW of Warwick; 78.8 km (49.0 mi) S of Toowoomba; 126 km (78 mi) SW of Ipswich; 166 km (103 mi) SW of Brisbane

Government
  - State electorate: Southern Downs
  - Federal division: Maranoa

Area
  - Total: 8.7 km^{2} (3.4 sq mi)

Population
  - Total: 91 (2021 census)
  - Density: 10.46/km^{2} (27.09/sq mi)
- Time zone: UTC+10:00 (AEST)
- Postcode: 4370
Suburbs around Allan
Leslie	Toolburra	Rosehill
Leslie Dam	Allan	Rosehill
Leslie Dam	Rosenthal Heights	Rosenthal Heights

Allan is a rural locality in the Southern Downs Region, Queensland, Australia. It was formerly known as Sandy Creek. In the 2021 census, Allan had a population of 91 people.

== Geography ==
The Condamine River forms the north-eastern boundary of the locality, while Sandy Creek flows through the locality from Leslie Dam (the locality) to the west towards Leslie to the north-west (eventually becoming a tributary of the Condamine River.

The Cunningham Highway passes through the locality from the south-east (Rosenthal Heights) towards the west (Leslie Dam). The South Western railway line runs roughly parallel to the south of the highway; there is no railway station within the locality. Major arterial roads in the locality are Sandy Creek Road which runs from the highway north-west to Leslie. The Leslie Dam Road runs south from the highway towards the Leslie Dam.

The predominant land is agriculture, both cropping and grazing.

== History ==
The locality is probably named after William Allan, an early settler, when the railway station was opened in 1904. Another theory is that it is named after botanist and explorer Allan Cunningham. The district was formerly known as Sandy Creek after the local creek.

A number of hotels were built at Sandy Creek in 1866. Adam Smith built the Darling Downs Hotel (locally known as the Sandy Creek Pub) in 1875. It operated as a coach stop for changing horses from 1880 until the railway opened in 1904. In the 1920s, the old Darling Downs Hotel was replaced with the current building.

Sandy Creek Provisional School on 13 May 1872. The school and residence were built by W. Wallace and H. Marshall for £304/10/0. In 1929, it became Allan State School. It closed in December 1967.

St Matthew's Anglican Church was opened on 17 November 1901. It closed in 1969 and the church building was relocated to the Slade School in Warwick.

The South Western railway opened from Warwick to Thane on 1 July 1904 with Allan railway station (28.1987°S 151.9497°E) serving the local area. As at December 2019, Allan railway station is designated as an abandoned railway station.

== Demographics ==
In the 2016 census, Allan had a population of 87 people.

In the 2021 census, Allan had a population of 91 people.

== Heritage listings ==
Allan has the following heritage sites:

- Allan State School (formerly Sandy Creek School), 280 Sandy Creek Road (28.1866°S 151.9526°E)
- Darling Downs Hotel (Sandy Creek Pub), 345 Sandy Creek Road (28.1837°S 151.9467°E)

== Education ==
There are no schools in Allan. The nearest government primary schools are Wheatvale State School in Wheatvale to the north-west and Warwick West State School in Warwick to the south-east. The nearest government secondary school is Warwick State High School in Warwick to the east.

== Attractions ==
The Sandy Creek Raceway of the Warwick Kart Club is at 335 Sandy Creek Road (28.1846°S 151.9480°E).
