= Leslie Dam, Queensland =

Leslie Dam
- Suburb
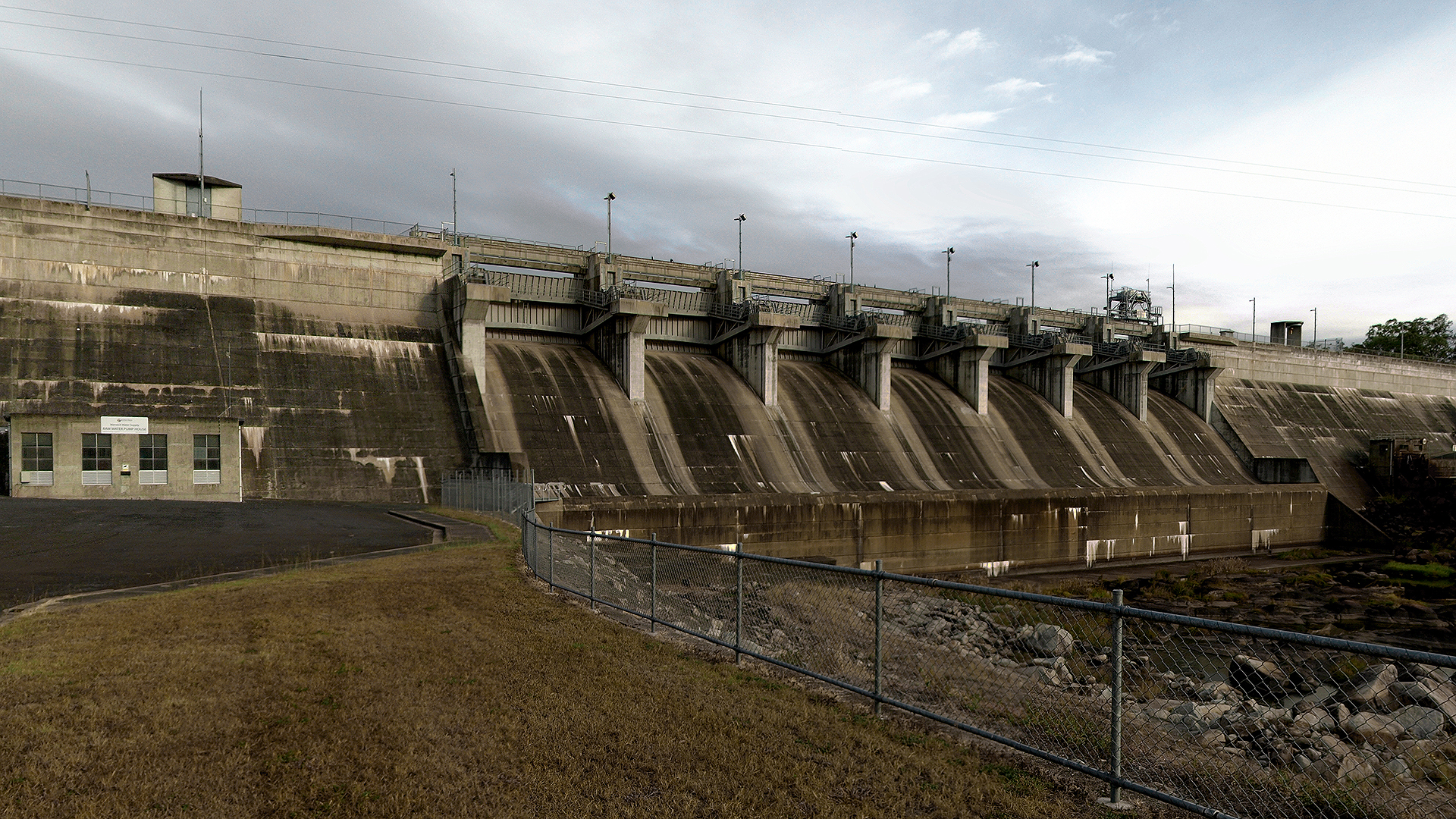
- Leslie Dam Spillway, 2018

- Interactive map of Leslie Dam
- Coordinates: 28.2511°S 151.8961°E
- Country: Australia
- State: Queensland
- LGA: Southern Downs Region
- Location: 14.6 km (9.1 mi) W of Warwick; 87.5 km (54.4 mi) S of Toowoomba; 172 km (107 mi) S of Brisbane

Government
  - State electorate: Southern Downs
  - Federal division: Maranoa

Area
  - Total: 106.5 km^{2} (41.1 sq mi)

Population
  - Total: 118 (2021 census)
  - Density: 1.108/km^{2} (2.870/sq mi)
- Time zone: UTC+10:00 (AEST)
- Postcode: 4370
Suburbs around Leslie Dam
Wheatvale	Leslie	Allan
Rodgers Creek	Leslie Dam	Rosenthal Heights
Palgrave	The Glen	Rosenthal Heights

Leslie Dam is a locality in the Southern Downs Region, Queensland, Australia. In the 2021 census, Leslie Dam had a population of 118 people.

== Geography ==
The locality is on the Darling Downs, an area of extensive agriculture. The north-west of the locality features a mountain range with unnamed peaks rising to 670 metres (2,200 ft). In the north-east of the locality is Mount Steele (28.2142°S 151.9346°E) at 568 metres (1,864 ft). The southern and central part of the locality are at lower elevations of under 500 metres (1,600 ft) while the very northernmost part of the locality falls away to 440 metres (1,440 ft).

Due to this geography, Sandy Creek and its tributaries flow from the south of the locality merging into a single stream through the gap between the mountains of the north-east and Mount Steele and below to the northernmost part of the locality. Leslie Dam is built across that gap (28.21722°S 151.91833°E), forming Lake Leslie (28.2367°S 151.9061°E) as a water reservoir.

Apart from the dam, the land use is predominantly grazing on native vegetation.

== History ==
The dam was completed in December 1965. It was built for water storage and not flood mitigation.

The locality takes its name from the dam, which in turn was named after the Leslie family, who were pioneer pastoralists on the Darling Downs.

== Demographics ==
In the 2016 census, Leslie Dam had a population of 163 people.

In the 2021 census, Leslie Dam had a population of 118 people.

== Education ==
There are no schools in the locality. The nearest government primary schools are Wheatvale State School in neighbouring Wheatvale to the north-west and Warwick West State School in Warwick to the east. The nearest government secondary school is Warwick State High School, also in Warwick.

== Amenities ==
Lake Leslie provides recreational opportunities for boating, fishing and camping.

There are three boat ramps on the eastern bank of the dam (28.22419°S 151.92127°E). They are managed by the Southern Downs Regional Council.
