= Leslie, Queensland =

Leslie
- Suburb
- Interactive map of Leslie
- Coordinates: 28.1725°S 151.9166°E
- Country: Australia
- State: Queensland
- LGA: Southern Downs Region
- Location: 13.3 km (8.3 mi) WNW of Warwick; 81.2 km (50.5 mi) S of Toowoomba; 168 km (104 mi) SW of Brisbane

Government
  - State electorate: Southern Downs
  - Federal division: Maranoa

Area
  - Total: 10.1 km^{2} (3.9 sq mi)

Population
  - Total: 12 (2021 census)
  - Density: 1.19/km^{2} (3.08/sq mi)
- Time zone: UTC+10:00 (AEST)
- Postcode: 4370
Suburbs around Leslie
Massie	Massie	Massie
Wheatvale	Leslie	Toolburra
Leslie Dam	Leslie Dam	Allan

Leslie is a rural locality in the Southern Downs Region, Queensland, Australia. In the 2021 census, Leslie had a population of 12 people.

== Geography ==
The Condamine River forms the northern boundary of the locality and the Cunningham Highway forms most of the southern boundary.

The South Western railway line enters the locality from the south (Leslie Dam) and exits to the west (Wheatvale). Historically, the locality was served by the now-abandoned Leslie railway station (28.1755°S 151.9221°E).

The land use is crop growing in the east of the locality with grazing on native vegetation in the centre and west of the locality.

== History ==
The locality was officially named and bounded on 14 September 2001. The name comes from the former Leslie railway station which was named after Patrick Leslie, a pioneer pastoralist on the Darling Downs.

== Demographics ==
In the 2016 census, Leslie had a population of 12 people.

In the 2021 census, Leslie had a population of 12 people.

== Education ==
There are no schools in Leslie. The nearest government primary school is Wheatvale State School in neighbouring Wheatvale to the west. The nearest government secondary school is Warwick State High School in Warwick to the south-east.
