= Toolburra, Queensland =

Toolburra
- Suburb
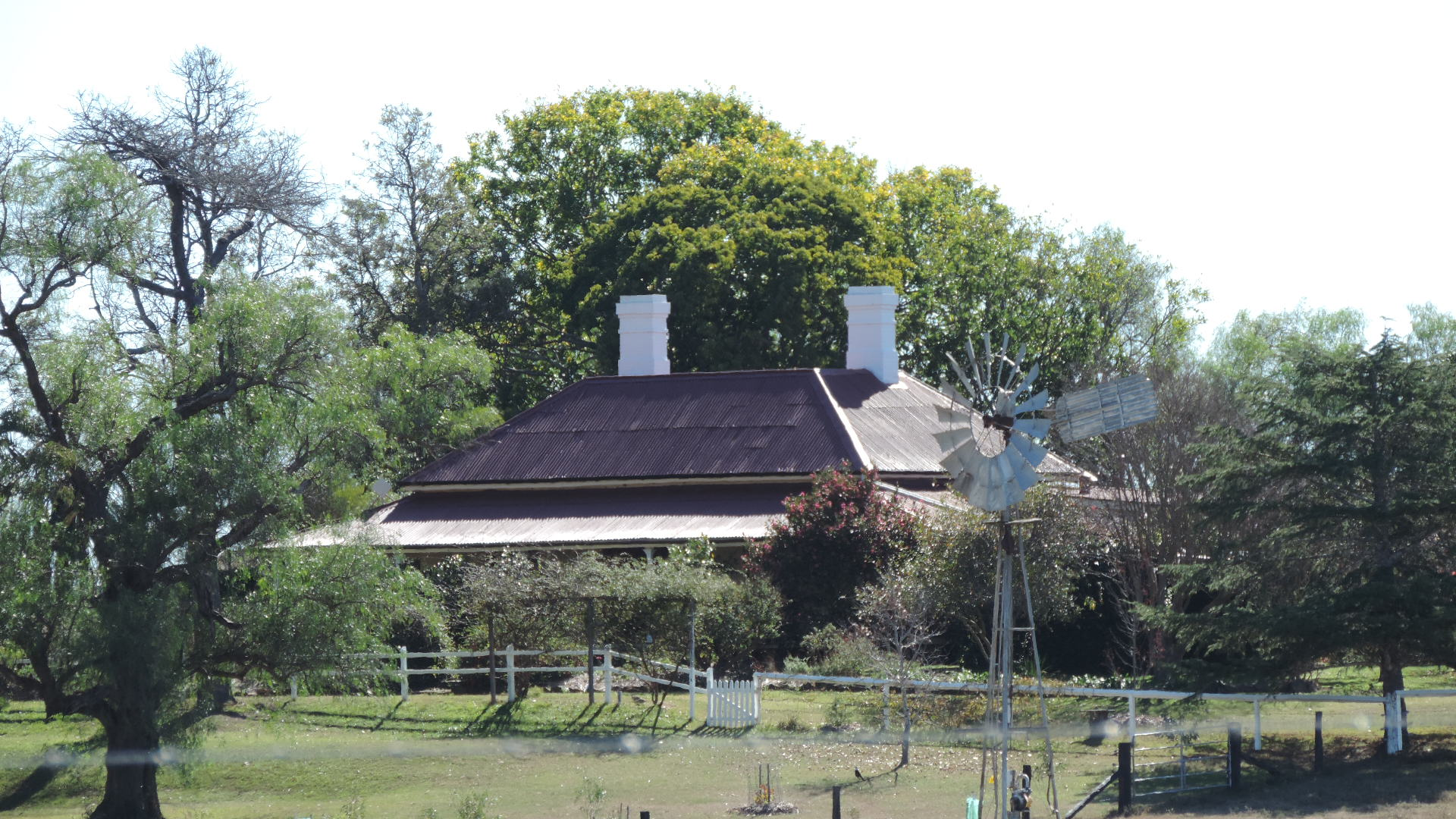
- Assmanshausen Winery residence, as seen from Sandy Creek Road, Toolburra, 2015

- Interactive map of Toolburra
- Coordinates: 28.1658°S 151.9649°E
- Country: Australia
- State: Queensland
- LGA: Southern Downs Region
- Location: 11.1 km (6.9 mi) NW of Warwick; 75.2 km (46.7 mi) S of Toowoomba; 123 km (76 mi) SW of Ipswich; 162 km (101 mi) SW of Brisbane

Government
  - State electorate: Southern Downs
  - Federal division: Maranoa

Area
  - Total: 11.2 km^{2} (4.3 sq mi)

Population
  - Total: 56 (2021 census)
  - Density: 5.00/km^{2} (12.95/sq mi)
- Time zone: UTC+10:00 (AEST)
- Postcode: 4370
Suburbs around Toolburra
Massie	Massie	Willowvale
Leslie	Toolburra	Rosehill
Leslie	Allan	Rosehill

Toolburra is a rural locality in the Southern Downs Region, Queensland, Australia. In the 2021 census, Toolburra had a population of 56 people.

== Geography ==
The Condamine River passes through the locality and forms part of its boundaries on the north-west and south-east. The river's confluence with tributary Splityard Creek occurs in the centre of the locality.

The Warwick-Allora Road passes through the locality from the south-east to the north-west forming part of the south-east and north-west boundaries of the locality.

The Southern railway line runs parallel and slightly to the north of the Warwick-Allora Road, with Toolburra railway station (28.1623°S 151.9668°E) serving the locality. However, there are currently no passenger services operating on this line.

Toolburra is an agricultural locality with little urban development. The land use is predominantly crop growing in the south-west of the locality and grazing on native vegetation in the north-east of the locality.

== History ==
The locality name Toolburra is taken from an 1840 pastoral run, and is believed to be a word from the Gidabal language, which means either tree people, territory marked by a clump of trees or spears being thrown.

== Demographics ==
In the 2016 census, Toolburra had a population of 42 people.

In the 2021 census, Toolburra had a population of 56 people.

== Heritage listings ==
Heritage-listed sites in Toolburra include:

- Assmanshausen Winery, Serisier Road

== Education ==
There are no schools in Tooburra. The nearest government primary schools are Glennie Heights State School in Warwick to the south-east and Wheatvale State School in Wheatvale to the west. The nearest government secondary school is Warwick State High School, also in Warwick. There are also a number of non-government schools in Warwick.
