= Womina, Queensland =

Womina
- Suburb
- Interactive map of Womina
- Coordinates: 28.18°S 152.0416°E
- Country: Australia
- State: Queensland
- LGA: Southern Downs Region
- Location: 5.0 km (3.1 mi) N of Warwick; 82.6 km (51.3 mi) S of Toowoomba; 209 km (130 mi) SW of Brisbane

Government
  - State electorate: Southern Downs
  - Federal division: Maranoa

Area
  - Total: 8.6 km^{2} (3.3 sq mi)

Population
  - Total: 207 (2021 census)
  - Density: 24.07/km^{2} (62.3/sq mi)
- Time zone: UTC+10:00 (AEST)
- Postcode: 4370
Suburbs around Womina
Willowvale	Willowvale	Sladevale
Rosehill	Womina	Sladevale
Warwick	Warwick	Sladevale

Womina is a rural locality in the Southern Downs Region, Queensland, Australia. In the 2021 census, Womina had a population of 207 people.

== Geography ==
Womaina is immediately north of the town of Warwick. The Cunningham Highway enters the locality from the east (Sladevale) and forms the eastern boundary of the locality; it exits to the south (Warwick).

The terrain varies from 460 to 590 metres (1,510 to 1,940 ft) above sea level with the land in the south of the locality being lower and the land in the north higher. The land use is mixed with some residential development (both suburban and rural residential) in the south of the locality (an extension of the Warwick suburban area), some crop growing, and some grazing on native vegetation.

== History ==
Opened on Saturday 30 September 1911, the Maryvale railway line branched from the Southern main line at Killarney Junction (now named Mill Hill) and stretched about 30 kilometres to Maryvale via Womina, Sladevale, Campbell's Plains, Freestone, Clintonvale and Gladfield. It was anticipated to be a segment of the Via Recta railway, but that project was never completed. Womina was served by the Womina railway station on the north-western corner of the Cunningham Highway and Womina Willowvale Road (approx 28.19056°S 152.04557°E). The line closed on 1 November 1964.

The locality was officially named and bounded on 5 September 2003. It takes its name from a former railway station name, which is Aboriginal word meaning "one".

== Demographics ==
In the 2016 census, Womina had a population of 234 people.

In the 2021 census, Womina had a population of 207 people.

== Education ==
There are no schools in Womina. The nearest government primary school is Glennie Heights State School in neighbouring Warwick to the south. The nearest government secondary school is Warwick State High School in Warwick. There are also non-government schools in Warwick.
