= Rosenthal Heights, Queensland =

Rosenthal Heights
- Suburb
- Interactive map of Rosenthal Heights
- Coordinates: 28.2533°S 151.97°E
- Country: Australia
- State: Queensland
- LGA: Southern Downs Region
- Location: 5.9 km (3.7 mi) W of Warwick; 83 km (52 mi) S of Toowoomba; 124 km (77 mi) SW of Ipswich; 163 km (101 mi) SW of Brisbane

Government
  - State electorate: Southern Downs
  - Federal division: Maranoa

Area
  - Total: 70.6 km^{2} (27.3 sq mi)

Population
  - Total: 2,664 (2021 census)
  - Density: 37.73/km^{2} (97.73/sq mi)
- Time zone: UTC+10:00 (AEST)
- Postcode: 4370
Suburbs around Rosenthal Heights
Allan	Rosehill	Warwick
Leslie Dam	Rosenthal Heights	Morgan Park
Leslie Dam	The Glen	Silverwood

Rosenthal Heights is a mixed-use locality in the Southern Downs Region, Queensland, Australia. In the 2021 census, Rosenthal Heights had a population of 2,664 people.

== Geography ==
The locality is on the south-western outskirts of the town of Warwick.

The Cunningham Highway enters the locality from the north-east (Warwick) and exits to the north-west (Allan). The South Western railway line enters the location from the north-east (Warwick) to the south of the highway, forms part of the locality's north-eastern boundary, before exiting to the north-west (Allan); no railway stations serve the locality.

The New England Highway enters the location from the north-east (Warwick), runs south-west through the locality, forming part of the locality's south-western boundary before exiting to the south-west (Leslie Dam / The Glen).

The elevation ranges from 440 to 620 metres (1,440 to 2,030 ft) above sea level with one named peak, Pine Rock in the west of the locality (28.2522°S 151.9483°E) at 607 metres (1,991 ft).

The land nearest Warwick is mostly suburban housing with rural residential housing beyond that. Those parts of the locality most distant from Warwick are used for farming, predominantly grazing on native vegetation with some crop growing.

== History ==
The locality takes its name from the parish, which in turn derived its name from a pastoral run name used by wool grower Frederick John Bracker in the early 1840s, from the German rosen meaning roses and thal meaning valley or glen.

In 1877, 27,800 acres (11,300 ha) of land was resumed from the Rosenthal pastoral run to establish smaller farms. The land was offered for selection on 19 April 1877.

Inverleigh State School opened on 6 October 1921. It was officially opened on Saturday 15 October 1921 by George Barnes, the Member of the Queensland Legislative Assembly for Warwick. The school closed on 21 July 1942. It was on a 5-acre (2.0 ha) site at 508 Lyndhurst Lane (north-east corner of Inverleigh Road, 28.24801°S 151.98185°E).

Rosenthal Lower Provisional School opened circa 1879. In 1889, it was renamed Rosenthal Provisional School It closed in 1892. It reopened in 1908 as Rosenthal Provisional School and become Rosenthal State School on 1 January 1909. It closed in 1942. It was at 37 Smelter Road (28.25485°S 152.01144°E).

== Demographics ==
In the 2016 census, Rosenthal Heights had a population of 2,259 people.

In the 2021 census, Rosenthal Heights had a population of 2,664 people.

== Education ==
There are no schools in Rosenthal Heights. The nearest government primary school is Warwick West State School in neighbouring Warwick to the north-east. The nearest government secondary school is Warwick State High School, also in Warwick. There are also private schools in Warwick.
