= Deuchar, Queensland =

Deuchar
- Suburb
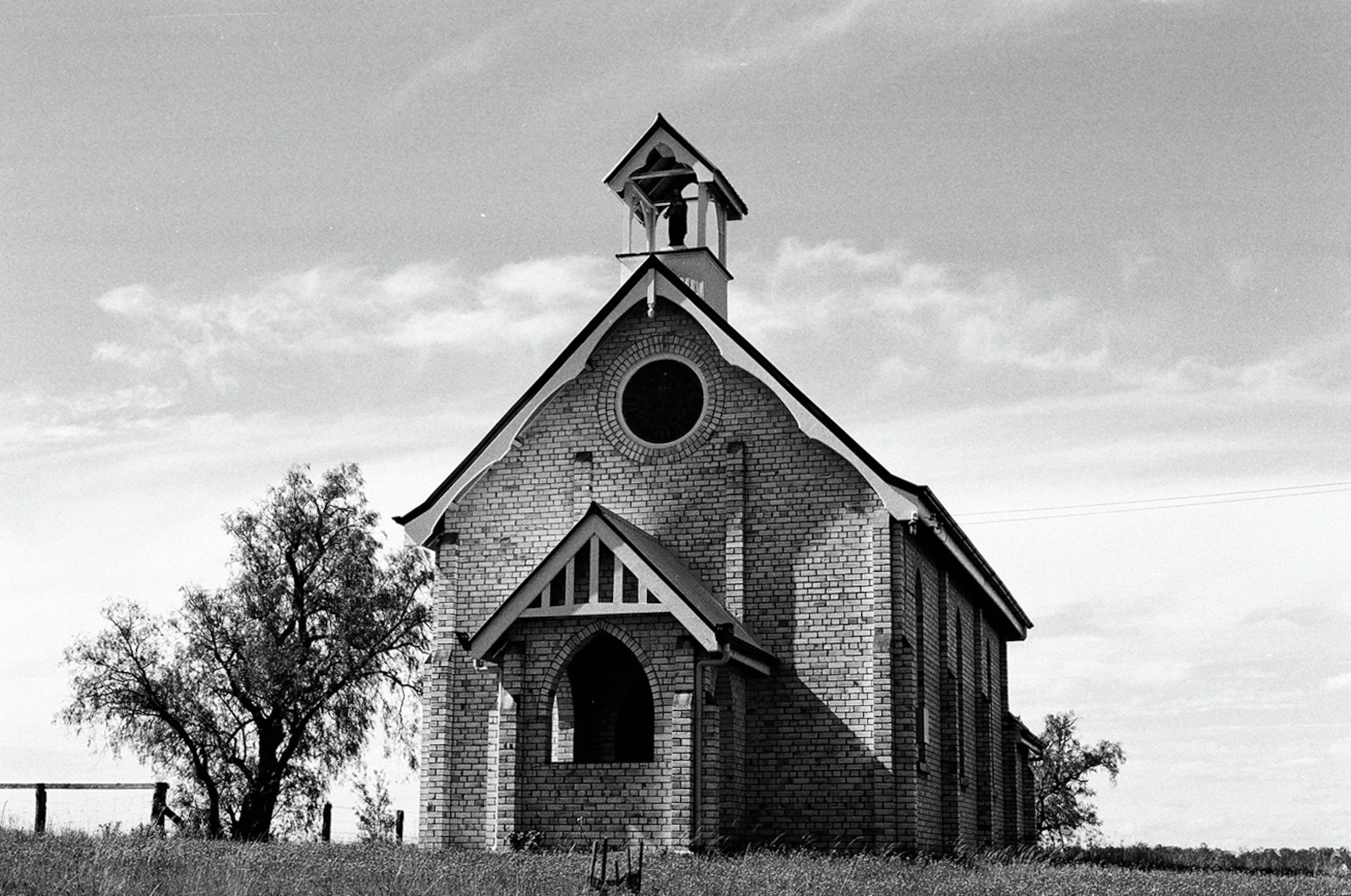
- Sacred Heart Catholic Church, 1996

- Interactive map of Deuchar
- Coordinates: 28.0986°S 151.9472°E
- Country: Australia
- State: Queensland
- LGA: Southern Downs Region
- Location: 17.5 km (10.9 mi) NNW of Warwick; 67.4 km (41.9 mi) S of Toowoomba; 159 km (99 mi) WSW of Brisbane

Government
  - State electorate: Southern Downs
  - Federal division: Maranoa

Area
  - Total: 39.5 km^{2} (15.3 sq mi)

Population
  - Total: 327 (2021 census)
  - Density: 8.278/km^{2} (21.44/sq mi)
- Time zone: UTC+10:00 (AEST)
- Postcode: 4362
Suburbs around Deuchar
Talgai	Hendon	Mount Marshall
Bony Mountain	Deuchar	Willowvale
Massie	Massie	Willowvale

Deuchar is a rural locality in the Southern Downs Region, Queensland, Australia. In the 2021 census, Deuchar had a population of 327 people.

== Geography ==
The Southern railway line enters the suburb from the north (Hendon) and exits to the south (Massie). The Warwick Allora Road also enters the locality from the north (Hendon, but to the east of the railway) and exits to the south (Massie, adjacent to the railway).

The land use is a mix of grazing on native vegetation and crop growing. The crops are mostly grown in the east of the locality.

== History ==
The locality is named after pioneer stock breeder John Deuchar who leased the Canal Creek pastoral run, managed the Rosenthal run, and was co-owner of Glengallan run from 1855 to 1870.

Deuchar Provisional School opened on 14 March 1904. On 1 January 1909, it became Deuchar State School. It was closed in 1921 due to low student numbers, but reopened in 1924. It closed permanently on 11 August 1967. It was at 98 Millar Lane, on the south-east corner of Deuchar Bony Mountain Road, now within the neighbouring locality of Massie (28.11510°S 151.94239°E).

Sacred Heart Catholic Church was built from brick on 3 acres (1.2 ha) of land donated by D. Dwan. It was designed by Coutler & Thompson. It was opened on Sunday 23 March 1919 by Archbishop James Duhig in the presence of nearly 500 people. It was on the north-west corner of Deuchar - Bony Mountain Road and Warwick Allora Road (28.115287°S 151.9517°E). Following some years of declining attendance, the church was closed and sold in June 2021. As at March 2024, the church building is still extant.

Deuchar railway station is an abandoned railway station on the Southern railway line (28.1086°S 151.9610°E). The station closed in 1989.

== Demographics ==
In the 2016 census, Deuchar had a population of 295 people.

In the 2021 census, Deuchar had a population of 327 people.

== Economy ==
There are a number of homesteads in the locality, including:

- Ellendee (28.0986°S 151.9582°E)
- Kirkliston (28.0923°S 151.9559°E)
- Kulai (28.1071°S 151.9251°E)
- Leeson (28.0819°S 151.9099°E)
- Lyndale Dexter Stud (28.1106°S 151.9269°E)
- Peppers (28.1052°S 151.9701°E)
- Ray-Van (28.0823°S 151.9318°E)
- Rempi (28.0888°S 151.9318°E)
- Rosenhoff (28.1052°S 151.9259°E)
- Stilla Himmel (28.0955°S 151.9334°E)
- Timburra (28.1002°S 151.9286°E)
- Tunnimarra (28.0937°S 151.9272°E)
- Virginia Farms (28.0980°S 151.9902°E)
- Wallingden (28.0953°S 151.9642°E)
- Warrawee (28.1076°S 151.9824°E)
- Warwick Farm (28.0853°S 151.9324°E)
- Wyoming (28.0905°S 151.9223°E)

== Education ==
There are no schools in Deuchar. The nearest government primary schools are Allora State School in Allora to the north-east and Wheatvale State School in Wheatvale to the south-west. The nearest government secondary schools are Allora State School (to Year 10) in Allora, Clifton State High School (to Year 12) in Clifton to the north, and Warwick State High School (to Year 12) in Warwick to the south-east.

== Amenities ==
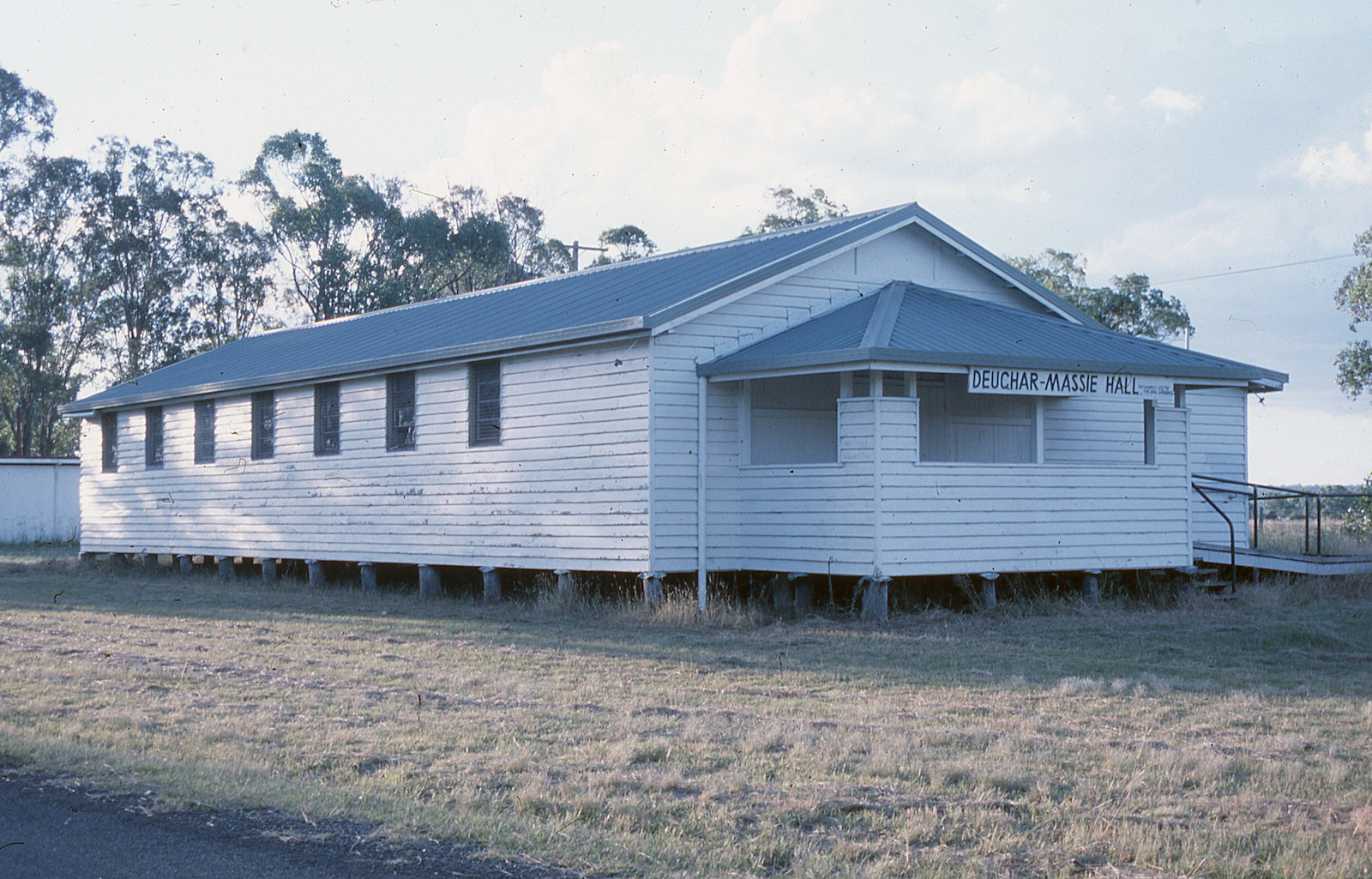
Deuchar-Massie Hall, 1997

Deuchar-Massie Hall is a public hall at 12 Massie Bony Mountain Road (corner of Massie Hall Road, 28.1490°S 151.9547°E) in neighbouring Massie to the south.
