= Willowvale, Queensland =

Willowvale
- Suburb
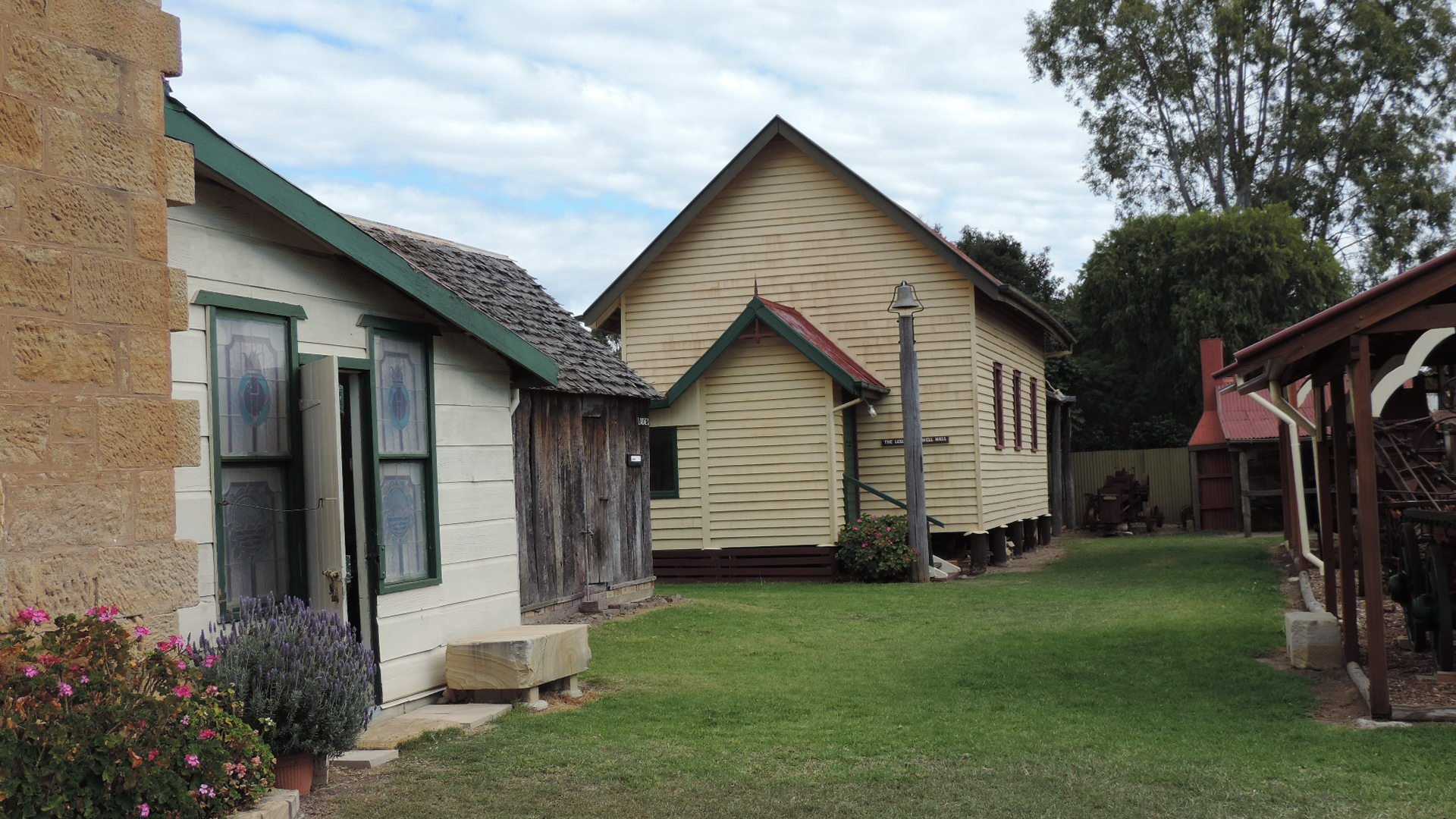
- Willowvale Presbyterian church, now relocated to Pringle Cottage Museum, Warwick, 2015

- Interactive map of Willowvale
- Coordinates: 28.13°S 152.0263°E
- Country: Australia
- State: Queensland
- LGA: Southern Downs Region
- Location: 13.1 km (8.1 mi) NNE of Warwick; 15.9 km (9.9 mi) SE of Allora; 74.2 km (46.1 mi) S of Toowoomba; 148 km (92 mi) SW of Brisbane

Government
  - State electorate: Southern Downs
  - Federal division: Maranoa

Area
  - Total: 47.3 km^{2} (18.3 sq mi)

Population
  - Total: 108 (2021 census)
  - Density: 2.283/km^{2} (5.91/sq mi)
- Time zone: UTC+10:00 (AEST)
- Postcode: 4370
Suburbs around Willowvale
Deuchar	Mount Marshall	Glengallan
Massie	Willowvale	Sladevale
Toolburra	Rosehill	Womina

Willowvale is a rural locality in the Southern Downs Region, Queensland, Australia. In the 2021 census, Willowvale had a population of 108 people.

== Geography ==
Willowvale is predominantly farm land with no urban development.

The Cunningham Highway forms the eastern boundary of the locality. Glengallan Creek flows from west to east through the northern part of the locality. Mount Juliet is located in the southern part of the locality.

== History ==
Grayson Provisional School opened in 1908. On 1 January 1909, it became Grayson State School. In 1912 it was renamed Willowvale State School. It closed in 1967. The school was at 361 Willowvale Road (on the south-west corner with Willowvale School Road, 28.1249°S 152.0313°E).

The Grayson / Glengallan Presbyterian Church was built on 0.5 acres (0.20 ha) of land opposite the Grayson School at 350 Willowvale Road (28.1244°S 152.0328°E). The land was donated by William Skerman and the church was erected using volunteer labour by local people. It officially opened on Sunday 19 September 1909. By 1913 it had become known as the Willowvale Presbyterian Church. In the 1950s it was relocated to Gillam Street in Glennie Heights (in the north of Warwick) to be the Glennie Heights Presbyterian Church. In 1972 it was relocated to the Pringle Cottage Museum operated by the Warwick & District Historical Society, where it was renamed Eastwell Hall after Leslie Burt Eastwell, a former president of the historical society and son of its founder.

== Demographics ==
In the 2011 census, Willowvale had a population of 286 people.

In the 2016 census, Willowvale had a population of 94 people.

In the 2021 census, Willowvale had a population of 108 people.

== Education ==
There are no schools in Willowvale. The nearest government primary schools are Glennie Heights State School in Warwick to the south, Freestone State School in Freestone to the east, and Allora State School in Allora to the north. The nearest government secondary schools are Warwick State High School (to Year 12) in Warwick and Allora State School (to Year 10).
