= Rosehill, Queensland =

Rosehill
- Suburb
- Interactive map of Rosehill
- Coordinates: 28.1836°S 151.9955°E
- Country: Australia
- State: Queensland
- LGA: Southern Downs Region
- Location: 5.8 km (3.6 mi) NW of Warwick; 78.4 km (48.7 mi) S of Toowoomba; 162 km (101 mi) SW of Brisbane

Government
  - State electorate: Southern Downs
  - Federal division: Maranoa

Area
  - Total: 19.9 km^{2} (7.7 sq mi)

Population
  - Total: 134 (2021 census)
  - Density: 6.73/km^{2} (17.44/sq mi)
- Time zone: UTC+10:00 (AEST)
- Postcode: 4370
Suburbs around Rosehill
Toolburra	Massie	Willowvale
Allan	Rosehill	Womina
Rosenthal Heights	Warwick	Warwick

Rosehill is a rural locality in the Southern Downs Region, Queensland, Australia. In the 2021 census, Rosehill had a population of 134 people.

== Geography ==
The Condamine River forms the south-western and southern boundary of the locality.

The South Western railway line enters the locality from the south-east (Warwick) and exits to the north-west (Toolburra). The Warwick Allora Road (also known locally as Rosehill Road) enters the locality from the south-east (Warwick), immediately parallel and south of the railway line. Within Rosehilll, the road crosses the railway line and runs north of it, but then resumes an immediately parallel course with the railway line but to north, exiting with the railway to Toolburra.

Within the locality, the terrain to the south of the railway line is flatter land with access to the river, while the terrain to the north has more hills. This is reflected in the land use which is mostly crop-growing south of the railway line and grazing on native vegetation to the north.

== History ==
The locality takes its name from the former Rosehill railway station (previously known as Lyndhurst Road, then Lyndhurst, and renamed to Rosehill in September 1885). The name refers to a local big hill covered in rosemary bush. The station was established by 1876. It had closed by 1951, despite the protests of local farmers. The station was at on the southern side of the Warwick Allora Road (approx 28.18381°S 151.99080°E).

Rosehill Provisional School opened circa 1890 but closed circa 1899. On 21 January 1901 it reopened, becoming Rosehill State School on 1 January 1909. It closed in 1940, but reopened on 29 January 1952 as Rose Hill State School. It closed permanently on 31 December 1966. It was on the northern side of Warwick Allora Road (28.18265°S 151.98865°E).

== Demographics ==
In the 2016 census, Rosehill had a population of 126 people.

In the 2021 census, Rosehill had a population of 134 people.

== Economy ==
There are two homesteads in the area:

- Rosehill (28.1815°S 151.9843°E)
- Lyndhurst (28.1958°S 151.9953°E)

== Education ==
There are no schools in Rosehill. The nearest government primary schools are Glennie Heights State School in neighbouring Warwick to the south-east and Warwick West State School, also in Warwick but to the south. The nearest government secondary school is Warwick State High School, also in Warwick to the south-east.

== Amenities ==
Warwick Rifle Range is at 446 Rosehill Road (28.1817°S 152.0097°E). Warwick Pistol Club holds two club competitions each week. It is affiliated with the International Shooting Sport Federation.
