= The Glen, Queensland =

The Glen
- Suburb
- Interactive map of The Glen
- Coordinates: 28.3361°S 151.9169°E
- Country: Australia
- State: Queensland
- LGA: Southern Downs Region
- Location: 21.1 km (13.1 mi) SW of Warwick; 105 km (65 mi) S of Toowoomba; 140 km (87 mi) SW of Ipswich; 179 km (111 mi) SW of Brisbane

Government
  - State electorate: Southern Downs
  - Federal division: Maranoa

Area
  - Total: 114.1 km^{2} (44.1 sq mi)

Population
  - Total: 32 (2021 census)
  - Density: 0.280/km^{2} (0.726/sq mi)
- Time zone: UTC+10:00 (AEST)
- Postcode: 4370
Suburbs around The Glen
Leslie Dam	Rosenthal Heights	Rosenthal Heights
Palgrave	The Glen	Silverwood
Palgrave	Dalveen	Dalveen

The Glen is a rural locality in the Southern Downs Region, Queensland, Australia. In the 2021 census, The Glen had a population of 32 people.

== Geography ==
The New England Highway enters the locality from the north (Rosenthal Heights) and forms part of the northern boundary of the locality before going south through the locality, exiting to the south (Dalveen).

Braeside Quarry is in the south of the locality immediately east of the highway. Apart from the quarry, the land use in the locality is grazing on native vegetation with a small amount of crop growing.

== Demographics ==
In the 2016 census, The Glen had a population of 31 people.

In the 2021 census, The Glen had a population of 32 people.

== Education ==
There are no schools in The Glen. The nearest government primary schools are:

- Warwick West State School in Warwick to the north-east
- Murray's Bridge State School in Murrays Bridge to the east
- Dalveen State School in neighbouring Dalveen to the south-east
- Pozieres State School in Pozieres to the south

The nearest government secondary school is Warwick State High School, also in Warwick. There are also a number of non-government schools in Warwick.
