= Assmanshausen Winery =

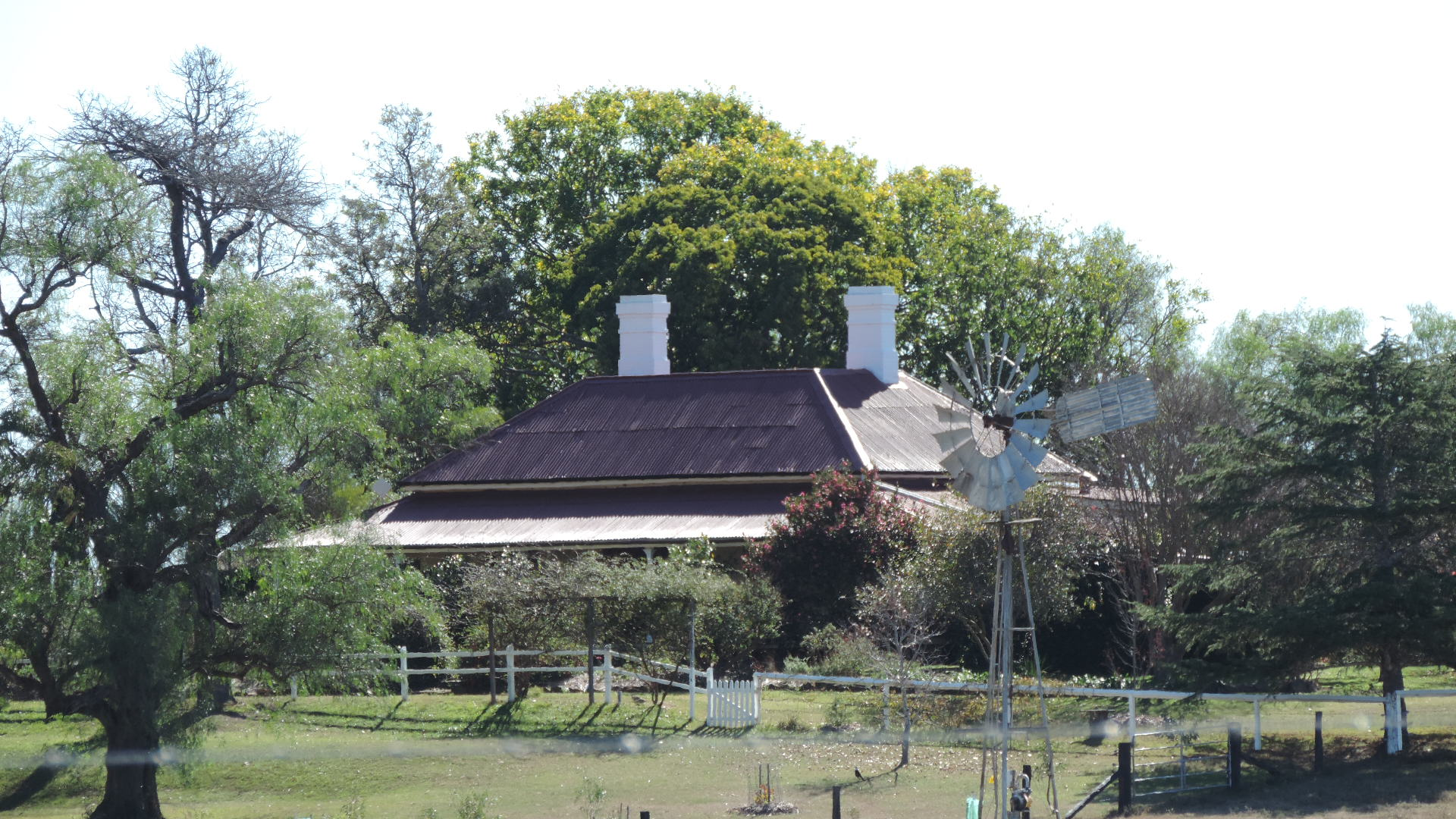
- Assmanshausen Winery residence, as seen from Sandy Creek Road, 2015

- Location within Queensland Location within Australia
- 28.175°S 151.939°E
- Location: Serisier Road, Toolburra, Southern Downs Region, Queensland, Australia

History
- Design period: 1870s - 1890s (late 19th century)
- Built: c. 1870 - c. 1881

Queensland Heritage Register
- Official name: Assmanshausen Winery and Residence (former), Toolburra Vineyards
- Type: state heritage (archaeological, built)
- Designated: 6 January 1999
- Reference no.: 601289
- Significant period: c. 1870-c. 1881 (fabric); 1864-1920, 1920-1940s (historical)
- Significant components: garden - bed/s, fence/wall - perimeter, laundry / wash house, residential accommodation - main house, winery, terracing, cellar, meat house, trees/plantings

Assmanshausen Winery is a heritage-listed former winery at Serisier Road, Toolburra, Southern Downs Region, Queensland, Australia. It was built from c. 1870 to c. 1881. It is also known as Toolburra Vineyards. It was added to the Queensland Heritage Register on 6 January 1999.

== History ==
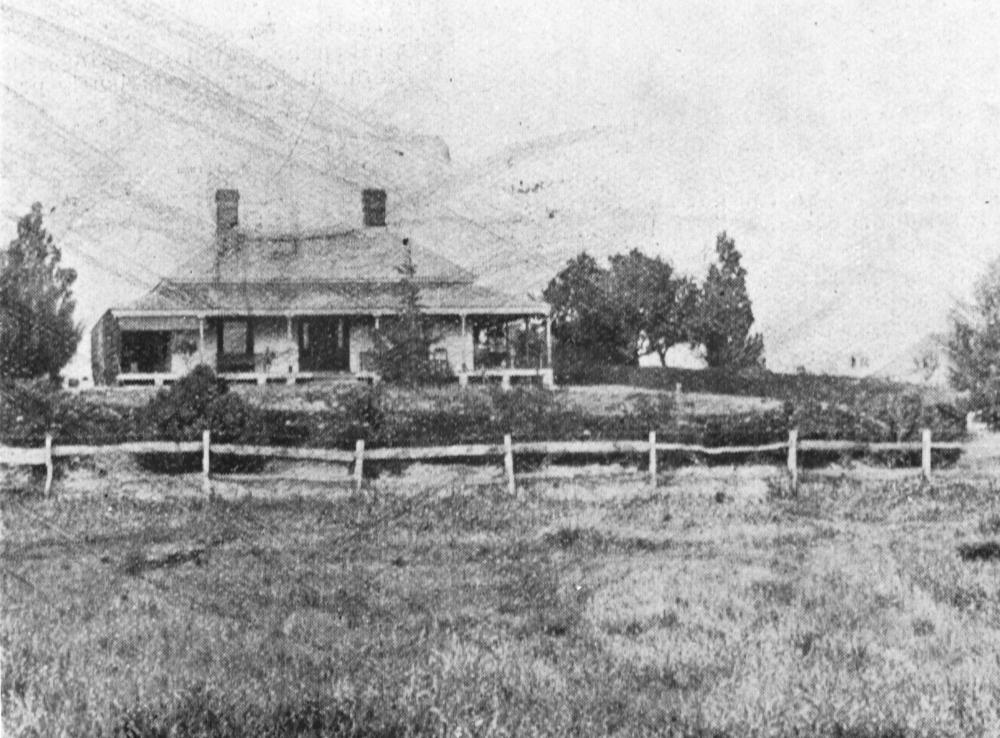
Jacob Kircher's Assmanshausen, 1901

Assmanshausen Vineyard at Sandy Creek, near Warwick was established in the 1860s by German immigrants Jacob and Elisabetha Kircher, who were also among the first in the district to establish commercial wine production on a substantial scale. In the late 19th century, Assmanshausen's award-winning wines were known throughout southern Queensland, and the winery was a popular attraction for visitors to the Warwick district.

Jacob and Elisabetha Kircher were early settlers on the southern Darling Downs, arriving at Moreton Bay in March 1855. Jacob gained employment as a gardener at Canning Downs Homestead near Warwick, when the principal stations on the southern Downs had extensive orchards and gardens. About 1857 the Kirchers left Canning Downs, Jacob working as a bushman on Rosenthal station and at various other activities, before taking up farming in the early 1860s. In December 1861 Kircher purchased adjoining portions 238 (45 acres (18 ha)) and 239 (45 acres (18 ha)), near Sandy Creek, about 7 miles (11 km) northwest of Warwick, for £81. The Kirchers were among the earliest farmers in the district. They fenced and cleared their land and experimented firstly with wheat, but after successive failures turned to vine growing, the first 1,000 vines being planted c. 1864. By 1870 they had established Assmanshausen Winery - named after a celebrated Assmannshausen wine-producing district on the Rhine.

Viticulture and wine production in the Warwick district was pioneered in the mid-19th century by principally German immigrants. By 1861, Germans formed 9.75% (217 persons) of the population of the towns of Warwick, Allora, Leyburn and the rural portion of the Warwick police district. Like the Kirchers, most were farmers sponsored in the 1850s by southern Darling Downs squatters. Most of those who pioneered the wine industry on the southern Downs took up selections on the Warwick Reserve or Warwick Agricultural Reserve in the 1860s. By the mid- 1870s a number of vineyards had been established along Sandy Creek, at Swan and Deuchar's Creek, and at the Jew's Retreat on Glengallan land. Only one vigneron relied solely on the vineyard as a source of income; most also grew wheat, maize and lucerne or had established orchards, and none of the vineyards exceeded 10 acres (4.0 ha). All made wine on the premises, and all had constructed cellars (some in stone, often two- storeyed and partly underground) in which the wine was both made and stored.

By 1876, Assmanshausen was the principal vineyard and winery in the Warwick district, with 10 acres (4.0 ha) under vines. Older plantings included both white (verdelho, muscadine and salvina) and red (black Spanish and Mataro) grapes, but more recent plantings were reds only: Mataro and Hermitage. Most of the vines were trellised, the newer ones planted about 6 by 6 feet (1.8 m × 1.8 m) apart, and Kircher had invented a horse-drawn cultivator which could weed and turn the soil close to the vines while the horse walked at a sufficient distance to prevent vine damage from the traces. Kircher was producing unfortified wines [dry wines made without the addition of cane sugar or spirits], and had already won prizes at the Warwick and Brisbane exhibitions. At this period the Assmanshausen winery comprised a dressed stone building of 3 flats: an underground cellar; a ground-level workroom; and a steeply pitched shingled roof containing an attic space. The attic was ventilated by 12 air shafts fitted with shutters on the inside, ensuring that the temperature in the attic was cooler than that of the ground floor. There were also 6 air shafts in the cellar. These shafts sloped through the stone walls to the surface of the ground. Kircher had devised his own system of wine production: the press was located in the ground floor workroom; from here the must (unfermented grape juice) was suction-pumped through pipes up to the attic, where it was fermented in 500 and 300 imperial gallons (1,400 L; 360 US gal) vats before being fed through more pipes to the underground cellar, where it matured in wooden butts.

In the 1870s, grape growing and wine production in the Warwick district emerged as an important economic activity. Warwick vignerons had reached a stage whereby they could hold much of their produce until it had mellowed and ripened with age, and the reputation of Assmanshausen wines in particular was growing. By 1881, Kircher had installed modern screw presses at Assmanshausen and his winery was described as one of the best in Queensland. At this period the presses were located in the attic, the must then gravity-fed down pipes to the ground floor where it was fermented in vats, before being piped to the underground stone cellar to mature. A timber, ground- level extension to the cellar may have been constructed by this time. Kircher had 11 acres (4.5 ha) under vines around his house, and a 5-acre (2.0 ha) vineyard about 0.5 miles (0.80 km) distant. He was also farming his land, with a 10-acre (4.0 ha) paddock under oats and 500 merino sheep. The Kirchers' residence (unlikely to be their first house on the property) was impressive also - described by one reporter in 1881 as "the neatest, best finished, and most comfortable dwelling I have ever seen among Queensland farmers or selectors ...", and in an 1887 report as "one of the most perfect in the colonies".

Assmanshausen figured prominently in the 1889 report on viticulture and wine-making in the southern districts of Queensland, prepared by the Under Secretary for Agriculture, Peter McLean, who visited the Warwick district in late 1888 or early 1889. Assmanshausen was then one of the oldest vineyards in the district, and Kircher, with wine exports to Scotland, was the only Queensland wine-maker then exporting to Britain or Europe.

By March 1901, the Assmanshausen vineyard still comprised just 10 acres (4.0 ha), but Kircher was devoting most of his time to wine production as distinct from general farming. The cellar was considered still one of the finest in the State, carrying on average about 18,000 imperial gallons (82,000 L; 22,000 US gal) of wine, with annual output averaging 4,500 imperial gallons (20,000 L; 5,400 US gal). Assmanshausen wine was seldom sold until it had aged 7 or 8 years, and was in demand throughout southern Queensland. Kircher had secured about 60 prizes and certificates for his wines, some awarded for exhibits sent interstate and to Britain and Europe. Both the winery and the vineyard were managed by Jacob Christian Barth, son of the Kirchers' adopted daughter, Mary Rickert of Warwick.

In March 1902, Assmanshausen Farm, Vineyard and Winery was advertised for sale. The property still comprised 90 acres (36 ha) of first-class agricultural land, 10 of which were under vines, and contained a substantial 8-roomed timber residence and a winery comprising a 3-floored stone cellar, attached to which was a timber and iron cellar. It failed to sell at this time, and following the death of Jacob Kircher on 30 April 1903, the property passed to a trustee, the Kirchers having no children. Following Mrs Kircher's death in 1912, title passed in 1915 to an American nephew, Michael Kircher, who had been managing the winery since c. 1902, prior to Jacob's death. In the early 20th century, following the federation of the Australian colonies and the removal of interstate tariffs, Queensland wine production declined in the face of strong competition from more established wine producers in South Australia and New South Wales. Henri Macquarie Serisier of New South Wales was associated with Assmanshausen from c. 1915, and in 1920 purchased the vineyard and winery from Michael Kircher for £2,200. Serisier was the son of Jean Emile Serisier, a successful Dubbo (New South Wales) vigneron, and had both Australian and European experience of viticulture and wine- making. He changed the famous Assmanshausen name to Toolburra Vineyards, and undertook extensive new plantings, many of which were table grapes. By 1922 he had about 65 acres (26 ha) under grapes, and was expecting to produce about 20,000 imperial gallons (91,000 L; 24,000 US gal) of wine that season - principally ports, muscat, madeira, sweet sherry, claret and hock.

HM Serisier remained at Toolburra Vineyards until a few years before his death in 1942, but in 1932 transferred the property to his son, Kelvin Eugene. KE Serisier sustained Toolburra Vineyards throughout the 1930s, but with the onset of the Second World War, when he joined the RAAF, the vineyard fell into decline and the winery ceased production in the early 1940s. At some period after the closure of the winery, the timber extension, and the shingled roof with its attic space, were demolished. The property remained with the Serisier family until 1980.

== Description ==
The former Assmanshausen Winery and Residence are situated on a low ridge just north of the intersection of Sandy Creek and Serisier Roads about 11 kilometres (6.8 mi) northwest of Warwick. The Sandy Creek district retains its rural character.

=== Winery ===
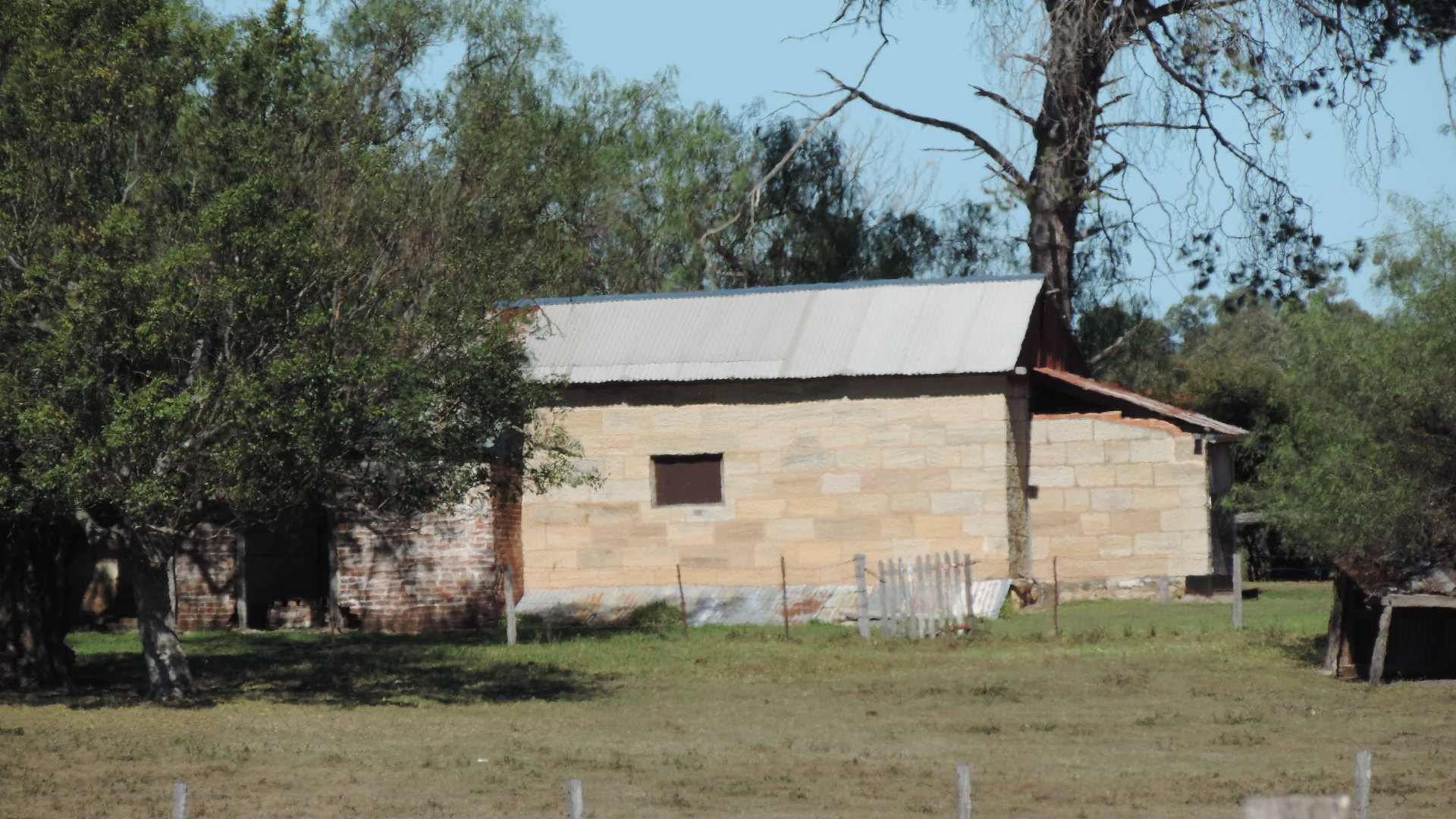
Winery, as seen from Serisier Road, 2015

The winery is situated a little to the northeast of the residence, on the same low ridge. It is a rectangular structure of dressed local sandstone, aligned lengthwise on an east–west axis, comprising a ground-level workroom and a deep cellar. It has a low-pitched roof of galvanised iron, replacing an earlier steeply pitched shingled roof, evidence of which can be seen in markings and cuttings on surviving beams and plates. Along the southern side is a skillion-roofed, open- sided extension with timber posts, in the place of the former roof overhang. At the western end is a small sandstone extension with a separate skillion roof and a large timber door, set one course above ground level. The extension gives access to both levels of the winery - up one more course to the workroom and down a steep timber stair to the cellar. At the eastern end of the workroom are large, timber double doors, again set above ground level. On the northern side of the building is a small, skillion-roofed later extension in brick. There are small, formerly shuttered windows along the northern and southern sides of the building, for ventilation rather than light. One of these on the northern side has been converted into a doorway, to provide access from the workroom to the brick extension.

Internally, the structure retains much of the original timbering, including heavy, square-hewn timber beams and posts. The wide timber boards of the workroom floor form the ceiling of the cellar. At the western end, the floor joists are early split logs; those at the eastern end of the building are later milled timber. There is an opening in the workroom floor midway along the southern side, sufficiently large to enable barrels or butts to be lowered into the cellar below. The workroom roof structure is of much later milled timber, and is unlined.

The cellar is accessed from the stair at the western end of the building. It has an earth floor, with a number of depressions possibly indicating where the barrel racks were positioned. There are 6 air shafts built into the walls of the cellar - two each in the northern, southern and eastern walls. These slope upwards to just above ground level, and help regulate the temperature to a constant c50? Fahrenheit.

The workroom is utilised as a storage shed but the cellar is vacant. No equipment associated with wine production remains in the building. None of the vineyard, which was planted along the ridge close to the winery, survives. However, considerable potential exists to search for archaeological evidence of the verandahs which formerly surrounded the stone structure, and of the late 19th century timber extension to the eastern end of the winery.

=== Residence ===
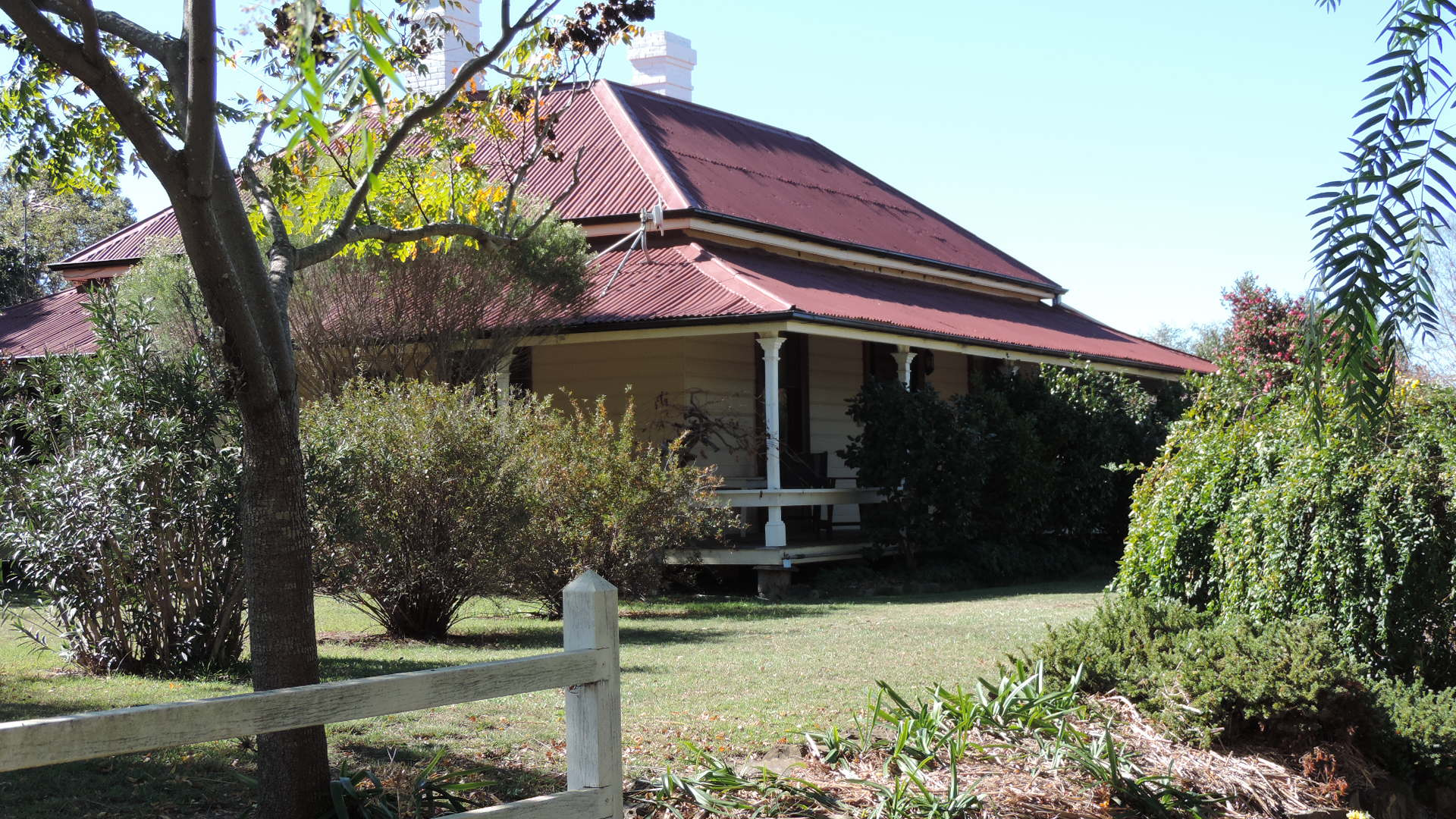
Assmanshausen Winery residence, as seen from Serisier Road, Toolburra, 2015

The house is situated close to Serisier Rd, but facing south toward Sandy Creek Road, in grounds containing mature trees and shrubs [including conifers and pepperinas (Schinus molle)], and early terracing. The residence is of timber construction, with a double hipped roof of galvanised iron, and rests on low timber stumps. The timber frame is clad externally with 8" pine chamferboards. The core of the house is surrounded by deep verandahs, which have been enclosed across the back (north) and at the northern ends of the side verandahs. These have roofs separate to the main roof, and where un- enclosed, are supported by chamfered timber posts with timber capitals. Along the front and western verandah low benches have been constructed between the verandah posts. There is no evidence of an earlier balustrade. Steps lead from the front [south] verandah to a garden terrace with flagstone path and early stone-edged flower beds.

The core comprises four rooms and a generous entrance vestibule, accessed from a central front entrance. To each side of the vestibule is a bedroom with large, double-hung sash windows opening onto the front and side verandahs, and beyond the vestibule is the parlour. Opening off the parlour, to the east, is the dining room. These rooms have particularly fine cedar joinery, including door and window architraves, cornices, skirting boards, a decorative timber arch between vestibule and parlour, and elegant timber fireplace surrounds. There are two double chimneys and a fireplace in each of the four main rooms, with original plaster to the chimneys. Throughout, the original pine lining to walls and ceilings - 8" deep, beaded tongue and groove boarding, horizontally laid on the walls - has been masked by later masonite sheeting with timber cover strips and wallpaper. Lights above some of the doors have early decorative wax paper. Several of the rooms have early decorative pressed metal cornices or pelmets above the windows.

French doors open off the western end of the parlour onto the verandah, which has been enclosed to make a small room. The rear verandah has been enclosed and extended to house a modern kitchen and living room, replacing an earlier rear kitchen wing and a bedroom wing. The rear extension is accessed from the core via the original central back door out of the parlour and the original doorway from the dining room. Another door opening from the parlour to the former rear verandah has been sheeted over. The northern end of the eastern verandah has been similarly enclosed and extended, to house a guest bedroom, bathroom, and laundry, and to provide walk-in closet space for the front bedroom on the east side. A side door from the dining room now opens into this enclosed verandah space.

The grounds at the rear of the house contain mature trees and shrubs and several timber structures associated with the homestead, including a meat-house and wash-house. The house block is defined by fencing - a three-railed timber fence, painted white, along the western boundary addressing Serisier Road; a similar two-railed fence along the southern boundary; and wire fencing along the eastern and northern boundaries. Two large pine trees, important to the garden setting of the residence, lie just outside the southern fence.

== Heritage listing ==
The former Assmanshausen Winery was listed on the Queensland Heritage Register on 6 January 1999 having satisfied the following criteria.

The place is important in demonstrating the evolution or pattern of Queensland's history.

The former Assmanshausen Winery (c. 1870) is important for its association with, and as a role model for, and as surviving evidence of, one of the earliest economic activities on the southern Darling Downs - the establishment of vineyards and wineries. The finely finished house (extant by 1881) illustrates the success of the winery, and the desire of its immigrant owners to establish themselves in their adopted country.

The place demonstrates rare, uncommon or endangered aspects of Queensland's cultural heritage.

Despite the loss of the upper level, the sandstone winery survives as a rare and important example of its type.

The place has potential to yield information that will contribute to an understanding of Queensland's history.

The place also has the potential to reveal, through archaeological investigation, further information about the nature of the structure, and to contribute to our understanding of wineries and wine-making in Queensland.

The place is important in demonstrating the principal characteristics of a particular class of cultural places.

It retains much early fabric (including the dressed sandstone and heavy adzed beams and posts), and design elements (including the underground sandstone cellar, air shafts and small shuttered windows in the upper level), which contribute to our understanding of the construction and functioning of a 19th-century Queensland winery. The addressing of temperature control through design and materials is particularly interesting. Despite the loss of the kitchen and bedroom wings at the rear, the residence core remains important in illustrating the principal characteristics of a well-detailed farmhouse, in which the quality of finish is well above the usual. The house retains its early form and most of the original fabric, including particularly fine cedar joinery and fireplace surrounds, and early pressed metal cornices above the windows.

The place is important because of its aesthetic significance.

Both the winery and the residence have considerable aesthetic appeal. The house, with its early form, wide verandahs, red roof and white chimneys, set amid a garden of mature trees and shrubs, is a local landmark. The winery has an aesthetic appeal engendered by the rusticity of the fabric, the atmospheric underground cellar, and the pleasant rural setting.

The place has a strong or special association with a particular community or cultural group for social, cultural or spiritual reasons.

Assmanshausen Winery has strong social significance - it was a popular tourist attraction in its time, and the names Assmanshausen and Toolburra Vineyards are well known in Warwick history.

The place has a special association with the life or work of a particular person, group or organisation of importance in Queensland's history.

The place is important for its strong association with Jacob Kircher's significant contribution to the development of the wine industry in southern Queensland, from the 1860s until his death in 1903, and illustrates the important contribution of early German immigrants to the evolution and development of Queensland.
