= Leslie Dam =

Dam in Queensland, Australia

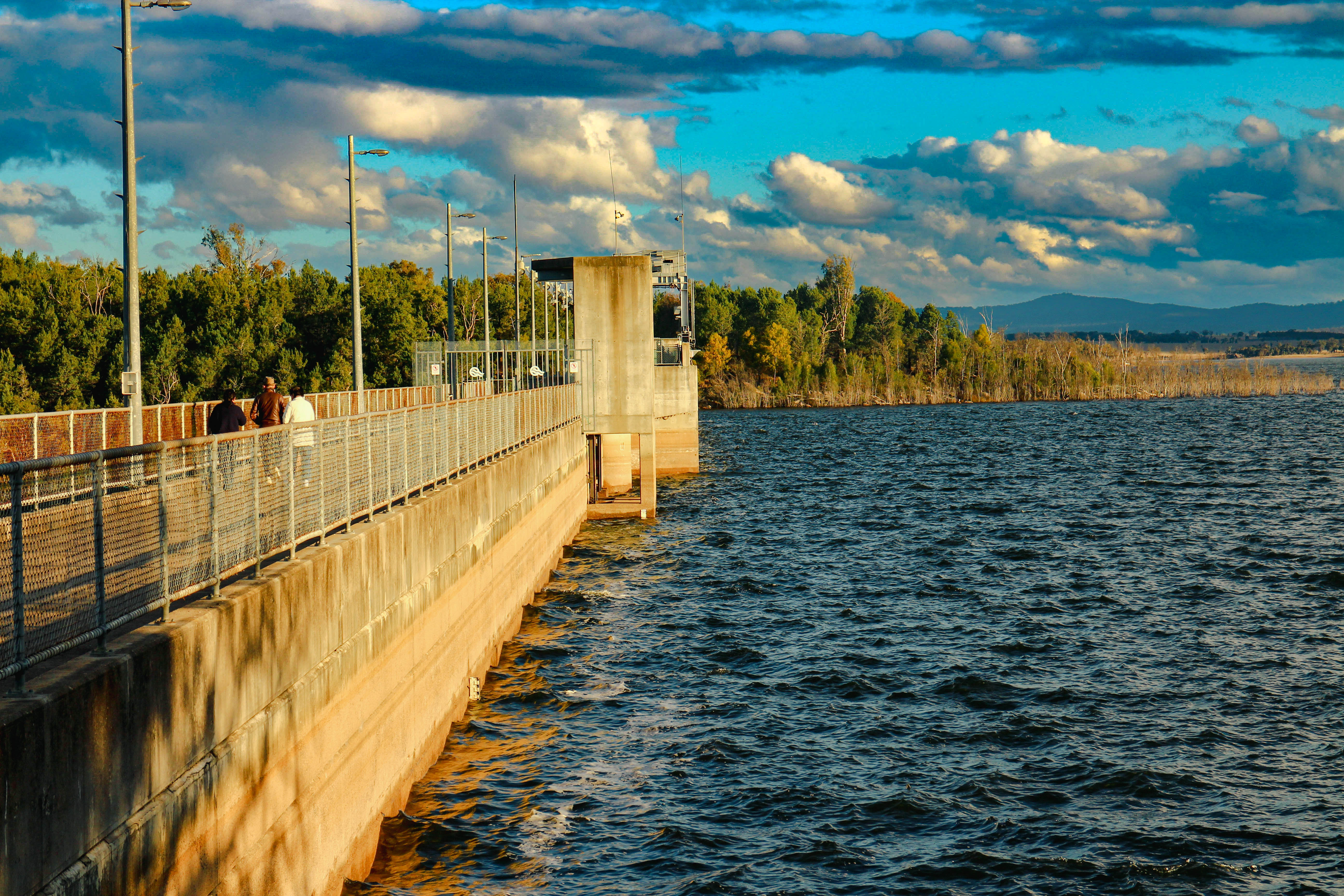
- The dam in 2025

- Location of the dam in Queensland
- Interactive map of Leslie Dam
- Country: Australia
- Location: Leslie Dam, near Warwick, Southern Downs Region, Queensland
- Coordinates: 28°13′02″S 151°55′05″E
- Purpose: Irrigation; Potable water supply; Recreation
- Status: Operational
- Opening date: 1965
- Built by: Water Resources Commission
- Operator: SunWater

Dam and spillways
- Type of dam: Gravity dam
- Impounds: Sandy Creek
- Height (foundation): 33 m (108 ft)
- Height (thalweg): 5.5 m (18 ft)
- Length: 384–424 m (1,260–1,391 ft)
- Elevation at crest: 473.63 m (1,553.9 ft) AHD
- Width (crest): 109.118 m (358.00 ft)
- Dam volume: 114×10^{3} m^{3} (4.0×10^{6} cu ft)
- Spillways: 7
- Spillway type: Radial gates (since 1986)
- Spillway capacity: 5,960 m^{3}/s (210,000 cu ft/s)

Reservoir
- Creates: Lake Leslie
- Total capacity: 106,250 ML (86,140 acre⋅ft)
- Catchment area: 603 km^{2} (233 sq mi)
- Surface area: 1,288 ha (3,180 acres)
- Maximum water depth: 28.9 m (95 ft)
- Normal elevation: 466 m (1,529 ft) AHD

The Leslie Dam is a concrete gravity dam across Sandy Creek, a tributary of the Condamine River, in the epyonomous settlement of Leslie Dam, near Warwick, in the Southern Downs Region of Queensland, Australia. Completed in 1965 to form Lake Leslie, the reservoir provides irrigation to approximately 124 square kilometres (48 sq mi) of farm land in the region, and supplies potable water to Warwick and surrounding settlements.

Operated by SunWater, the dam was named after Patrick Leslie (1815–1881), an early settler in the region and the first person to buy land in Warwick.

== Overview ==
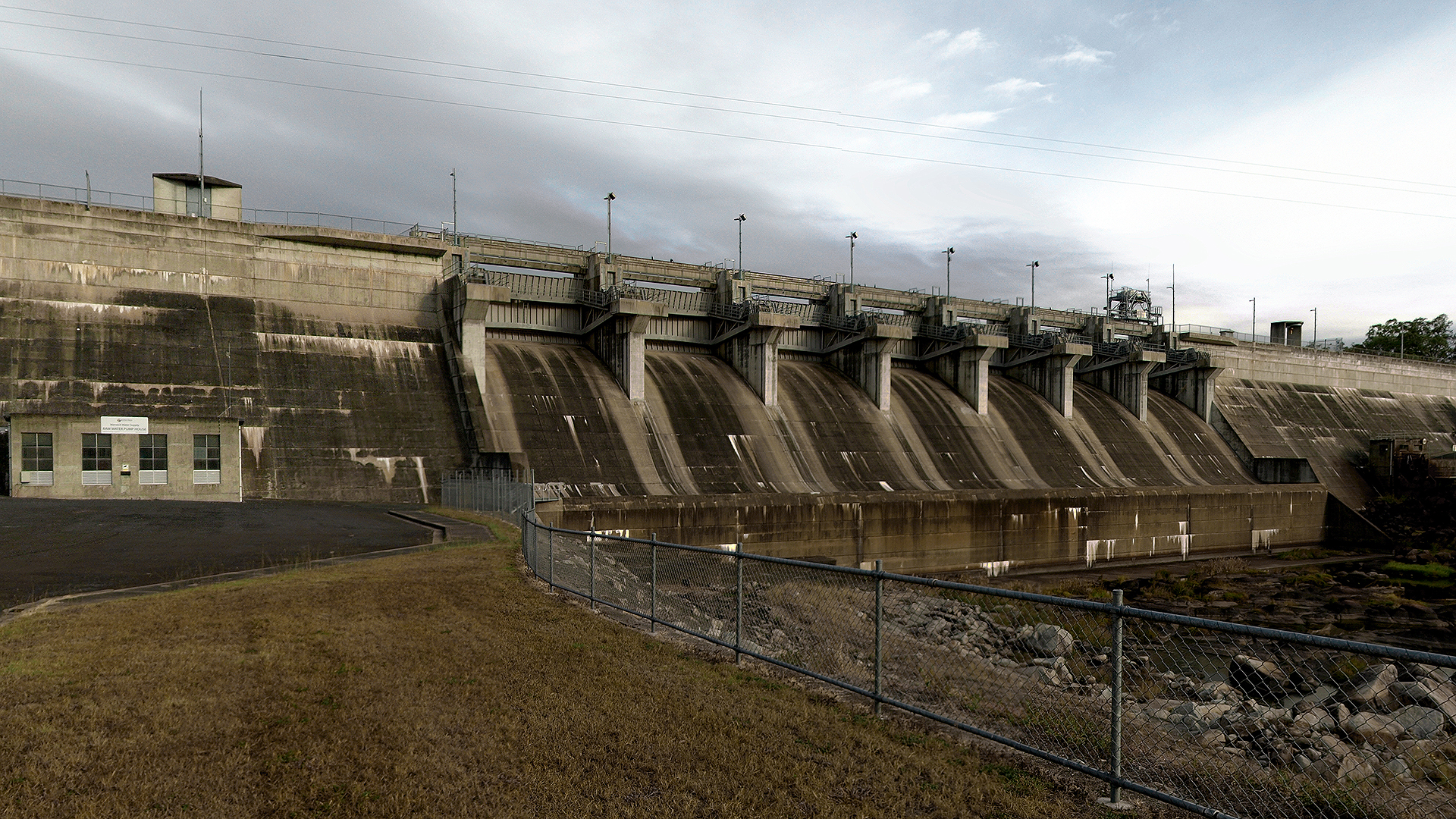
Spillway, 2018

The dam wall is 33 metres (108 ft) high and in the range of 384 to 424 metres (1,260 to 1,391 ft) long. (Note: Data varies between Australian National Committee on Large Dams and the SunWater-prepared Emergency Action Plan.) The resultant reservoir has a capacity of 106,250 megalitres (86,140 acre⋅ft) when full, and covers 1,288 hectares (3,180 acres), drawing from a catchment area of 603 square kilometres (233 sq mi).

The initial construction was completed in October 1965 and created a reservoir with 47,119 megalitres (38,200 acre⋅ft) of water storage capacity. In 1986, the dam wall was raised by 3 metres (9.8 ft) and seven controlled hydraulic-operated radial gates were added to the spillway in a project completed by Hornibrook, each 12.74 metres (41.8 ft) wide and 6.64 metres (21.8 ft) high. The improvements resulted in more-than doubling the capacity of the reservoir to 106,250 megalitres (86,140 acre⋅ft).

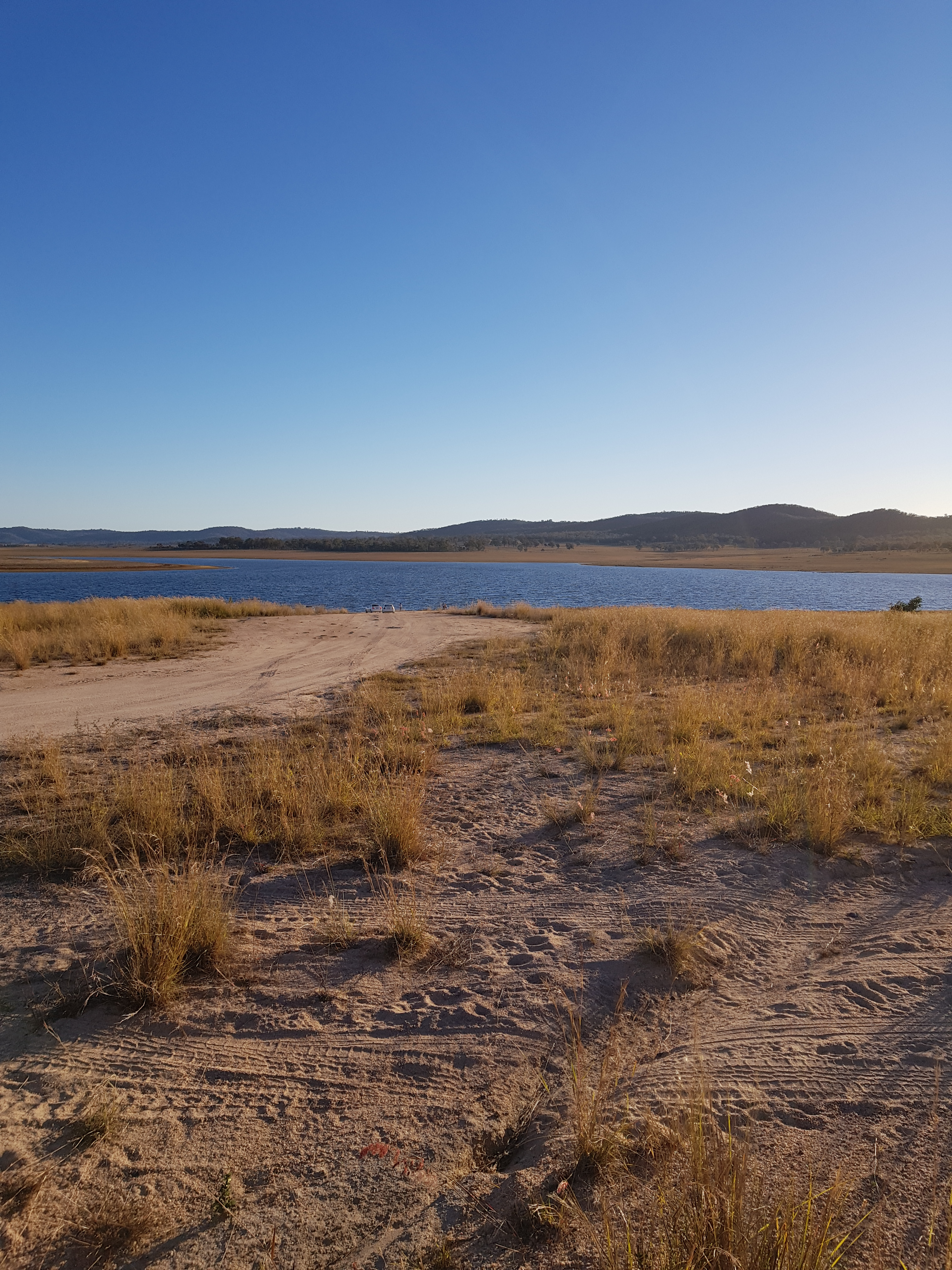
Drought at the dam, 2019

The dam's highest level was reached on 12 September 1988 when waters in the dam peaked at 20 centimetres (7.9 in) above the spillway. The next highest level was 13 centimetres (5.1 in) above the spillway on 28 May 1990. On 11 February 1995, the dam reached its lowest level ever of 3% capacity.

The Leslie Dam as part of spillway capacity upgrade program commenced in 2008 by SunWater to ensure a consistently high level of safety for the dams under their control.

On 5 January 2011, the dam spilled for the first time in more than two decades and all seven floodgates were opened. Downstream of the dam, the Sandy Creek was flooded and the Cunningham Highway was forced to close. Warwick's mayor, Ron Bellingham, called on SunWater to reduce the flow of water from the dam, that was put into effect the following day.

== Recreation ==
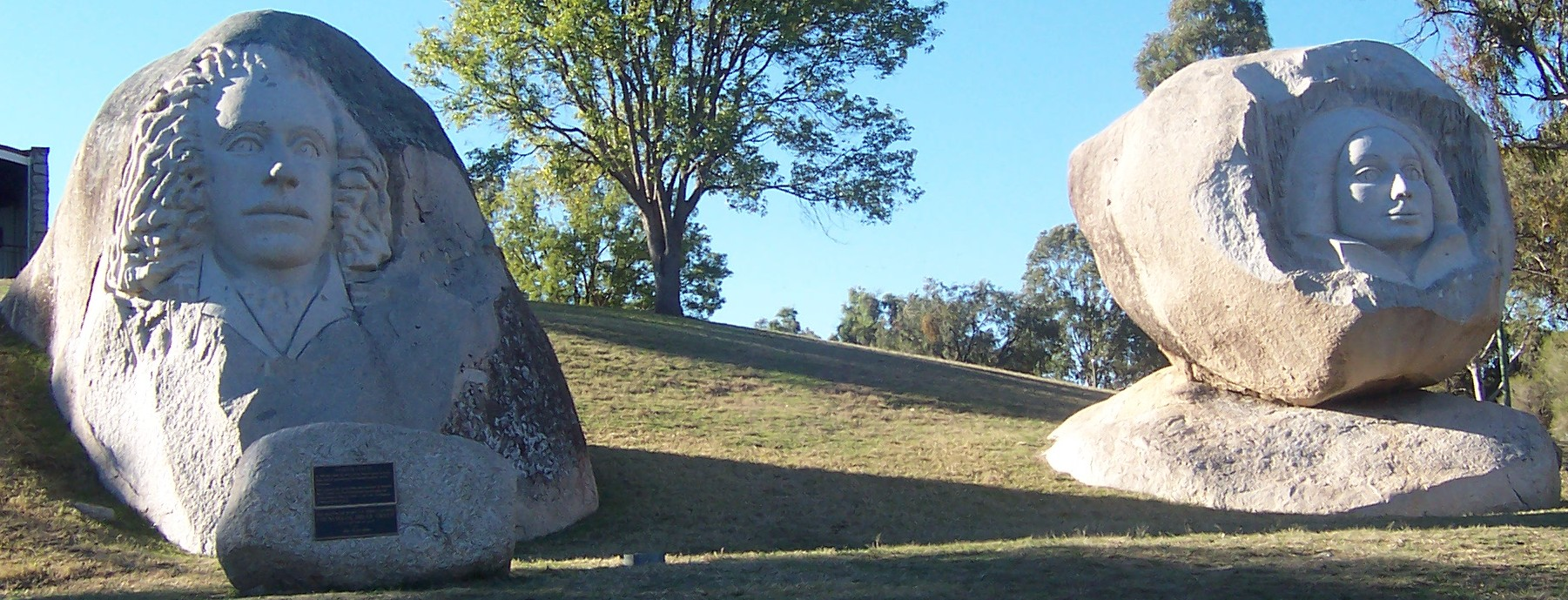
Sculptures of Patrick and Kate Leslie, 2006

On 21 October 2001, sculpltures of Patrick Leslie and his wife, Kate, were unveiled as part of the Centenary of Federation Celebrations and as a tribute to pioneering women. The sculptures are located near the dam wall.

Freshwater fishing and water sports facilities are available on the reservoir. A Stocked Impoundment Permit is required to fish in the dam.

An upgrade of recreation facilities at Leslie Dam was announced in 2022 and completed in 2024.
