= Dalveen Tunnel =

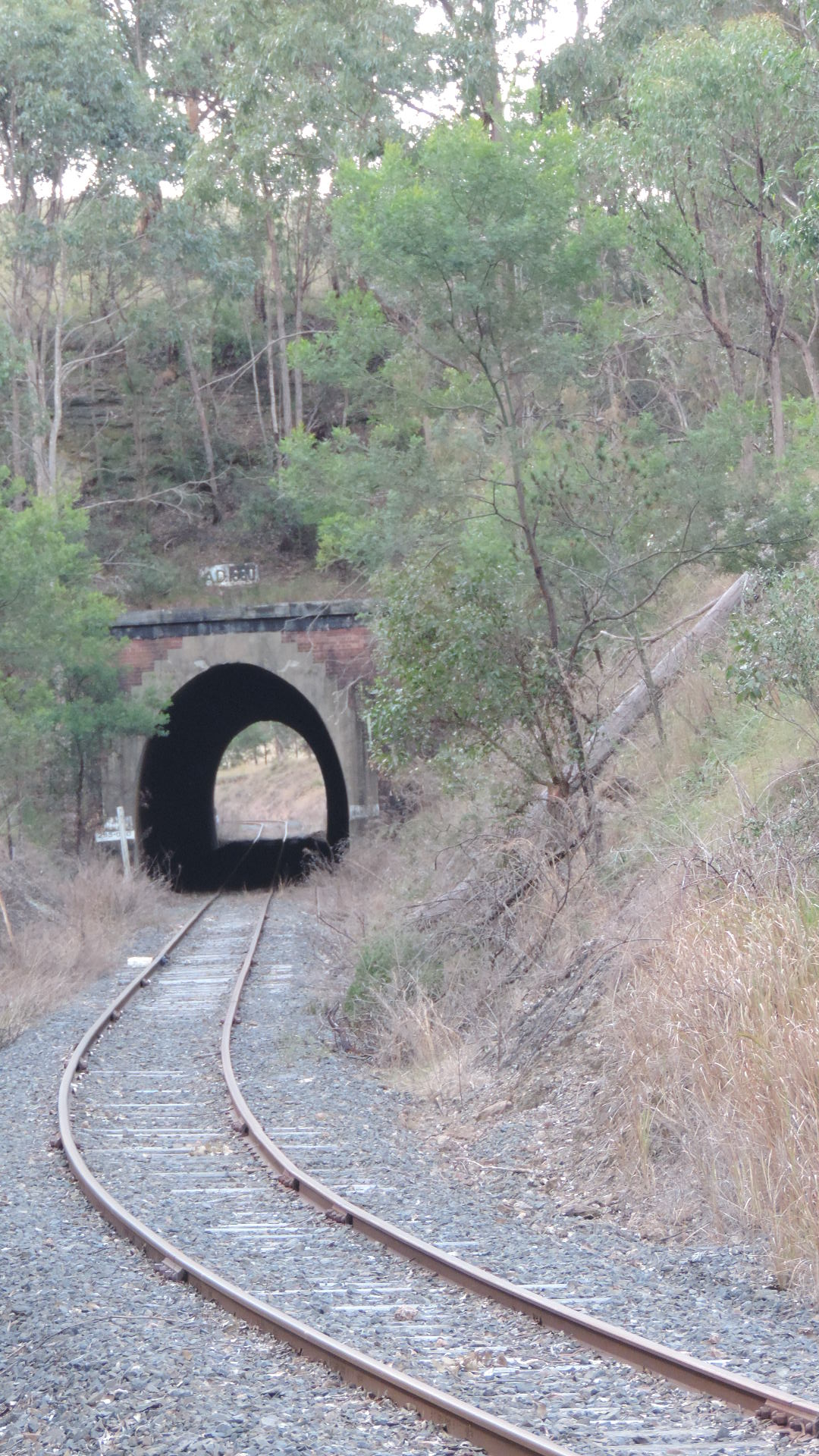
- Dalveen Tunnel on the Southern railway line, 2015

- Location within Queensland Location within Australia
- 28.4889°S 151.9803°E
- Location: Warwick to Wallangarra railway line, Dalveen, Southern Downs Region, Queensland, Australia

History
- Design period: 1870s - 1890s (late 19th century)
- Built: 1878 - 1880

Queensland Heritage Register
- Official name: Dalveen Tunnel
- Type: state heritage (built)
- Designated: 28 July 2000
- Reference no.: 601519
- Significant period: 1870s, 1880s (fabric)
- Significant components: tunnel - railway, cutting - railway
- Builders: J Garget

Dalveen Tunnel is a heritage-listed tunnel on the Warwick to Wallangarra railway line, Dalveen, Southern Downs Region, Queensland, Australia. It was built from 1878 to 1880 by J Garget. It was added to the Queensland Heritage Register on 28 July 2000.

== History ==
The exploitation of the mineral resources of Queensland was recognised by political interests in Queensland as being closely linked with the development of a railway system from the period of the late 1860s and early 1870s. This connection between political decisions and economic development was further linked and with the decision taken in 1877 to construct mineral railways running from Townsville to Charters Towers (Great Northern Railway), Bundaberg to Mount Perry (Mount Perry railway line) and Maryborough to Gympie (North Coast railway line). The extension of the Southern & Western Railway from Warwick to Stanthorpe was approved along with extensions to Roma and Emerald on the same day in Parliament, 30 August 1877. The decision to construct separate railway systems with no connection to other parts of the Queensland Railway system was to result in a proliferation of separate railways throughout Queensland, (up to eleven by 1891). The system would not be unified until 1924 with the opening of the North Coast Line between Brisbane and Cairns.

The agitation for the construction of a railway from the town of Warwick to the mining centre of Stanthorpe was a major political and social rallying point for the population of the southern tablelands. The booming tin mining area around Stanthorpe provided the impetus for the extension of the railway south from Warwick. The railway had opened to Warwick on 9 January 1871. In 1873 a survey from Warwick to Stanthorpe was begun and the 41.5-mile (66.8 km) route to Stanthorpe was mapped. However this survey included two costly tunnels- one 29 chains (1,900 ft; 580 m) in length to save a 1.75-mile (2.82 km) detour and a 13-chain-long (260 m) tunnel to save 2.5 miles (4.0 km). The permanent survey was then pressed forward, but the line that was surveyed passed through the centre of Warwick, and as a result meant expensive earthworks in the centre of the town.

A permanent survey was completed in 1876 to the 85-mile (137 km) mark, which was 27 miles (43 km) from Warwick. On this survey there were several deviations made to shorten the overall distance of the line. In 1878 the working plans for the section from Warwick to Stanthorpe were finally prepared. Tenders were called for on the 1st and 2nd sections Warwick - Stanthorpe at the end of January 1878. Section one ran to a point 20 miles 28.19 chains (32.754 km) south of Warwick, whilst Section two ran 20 miles 41.60 chains (33.024 km) to Stanthorpe.

Section 1 was awarded to J&A Overend and Co. for £178784 and J. Garget on Section 2 for £105983 . Construction was described in the Commissioners report as follows:

Section 2- as 1st tenders were considered too high, fresh tenders were called and the contract given to Garget. Clearing of the right of way began in November 1878, as well as some cuttings were begun.

The Dalveen tunnel was constructed to pierce a spur of the Silverwood Range. It was one of the major works on the second contract of the line to Stanthorpe. By the end of 1879 it was noted that:

The heading of No. 2 tunnel at 84 miles 20 chains was excavated to about one-third of the total length, and a large number of bricks had been prepared in readiness for the lining.

Section Two of the contract did not involve the difficulties that were encountered on the works around the Cherry Gully tunnel. was a case where the going was much easier. In common with railway construction of the time a camp would have been situated nearby to act as labour base for its workings. On Section Two some 325 men were employed at this time. In 1880 Minister for Works, John Macrossan visited the railway works and made an inspection as far as Garget's Camp. The Stanthorpe Border Post and Stannum Miner reported on his visit:

The construction camps were temporary townships, and were supplied with drinking establishments, sometimes a school, contractor stores even places of worship. Some of the hotels were recorded by local correspondents and give an idea of some of the places. Edmund Power had a drinking establishment on the Second Section at Telegraph Road crossing, and also John Commerford opened the North Australian Hotel, Main Camp, at the New Tunnel on the 2nd section.

Life in the camps could be a perilous affair at times, especially where hot tempers were concerned. A dispute over the return of the loan of a few shillings lead to the shooting of John O'Neil a sub-contractor on Section Two. The individual who shot O'Neil, Felix was a Frenchman. The Stanthorpe Border Post noted that O'Neil died in agony nearly six hours after the shooting. Felix made no attempt to escape. Rather he was caught by O'Neil's mates, after Felix had a leisurely breakfast, and was preparing to ride to Stanthorpe.

The Commissioner's Report for 1880 noted that the excavation and lining of No.2 tunnel had been completed and that only track laying remained to be done. On Section Two progress was much faster, and the Commissioners Report noted that only platelaying and Ballasting required completion. The line from Cherry Gully through to Stanthorpe was opened throughout on 1 May 1881, and was taken over by the railways on 1 November 1881. It was noted that the tunnel (on Section Two) was a work to be proud of, perfectly straight, true curves of arch, bright red brick and pure whiteness of stone facing, the whole of the tunnel being on a 1 in 50 grade. The works were acknowledged as being of great credit to all concerned.

== Description ==
The Dalveen tunnel is situated at 183 miles (295 km) from Roma Street railway station on the Southern Line between Warwick and Wallangarra. The tunnel is of semi-elliptical cross-section, and is brick lines with brick arches and brick portals featuring sandstone quoins. The southern portal (Dalveen portal) features a date of 1880.

== Heritage listing ==
Dalveen Tunnel was listed on the Queensland Heritage Register on 28 July 2000 having satisfied the following criteria.

The place is important in demonstrating the evolution or pattern of Queensland's history.

The Warwick-Stanthorpe railway was one of several major railway lines approved by the Queensland Parliament in 1877, to access mineral fields throughout Queensland, but particularly of the Stannum district. The tunnel allows for an interpretation of the construction techniques of the latter part of the nineteenth century, especially with the use of drilling equipment, and the experimental use of concrete, in a railway context. As part of the development of the Southern line, and the eventual inter-colonial connection with New South Wales at Wallangarra, the tunnel was one of the major engineering works undertaken on what was in the period of 1889–1930 Queensland's busiest mainline. Its survival and ongoing use allows for the interpretation of the importance of the Queensland Railway network in the economic development of Queensland.

The place is important in demonstrating the principal characteristics of a particular class of cultural places.

The Dalveen Tunnel is important as a substantially intact example of innovative engineering technology used in association with railway construction.
