= Cherry Gully Tunnel =

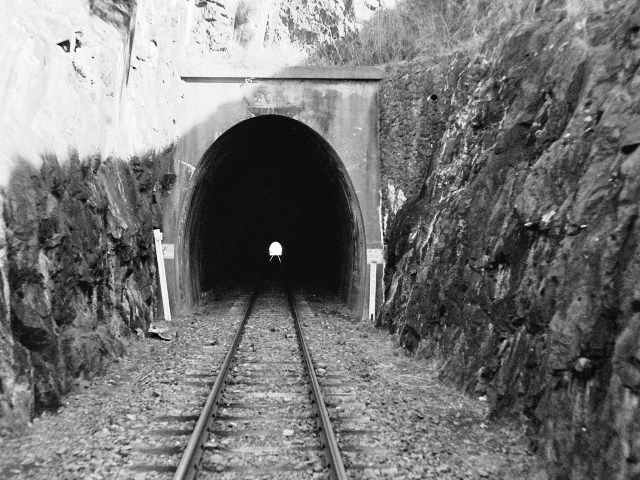
- Cherry Gully Tunnel

- Location within Queensland Location within Australia
- 28.4114°S 152.027°E
- Location: Warwick–Stanthorpe Line, Silverwood, Southern Downs Region, Queensland, Australia

History
- Design period: 1870s–1890s (late 19th century)
- Built: 1878–1880

Queensland Heritage Register
- Official name: Cherry Gully Tunnel, Gorge Tunnel
- Type: state heritage (built)
- Designated: 28 July 2000
- Reference no.: 601517
- Significant period: 1870s, 1880s (fabric)
- Significant components: cutting – railway, tunnel – railway
- Builders: J & A Overend & Co

Cherry Gully Tunnel is a heritage-listed railway tunnel on the Warwick–Stanthorpe Line, Silverwood, Southern Downs Region, Queensland, Australia. It was built from 1878 to 1880 by J & A Overend & Co. It is also known as Gorge Tunnel and Big Tunnel. It was added to the Queensland Heritage Register on 28 July 2000.

== History ==
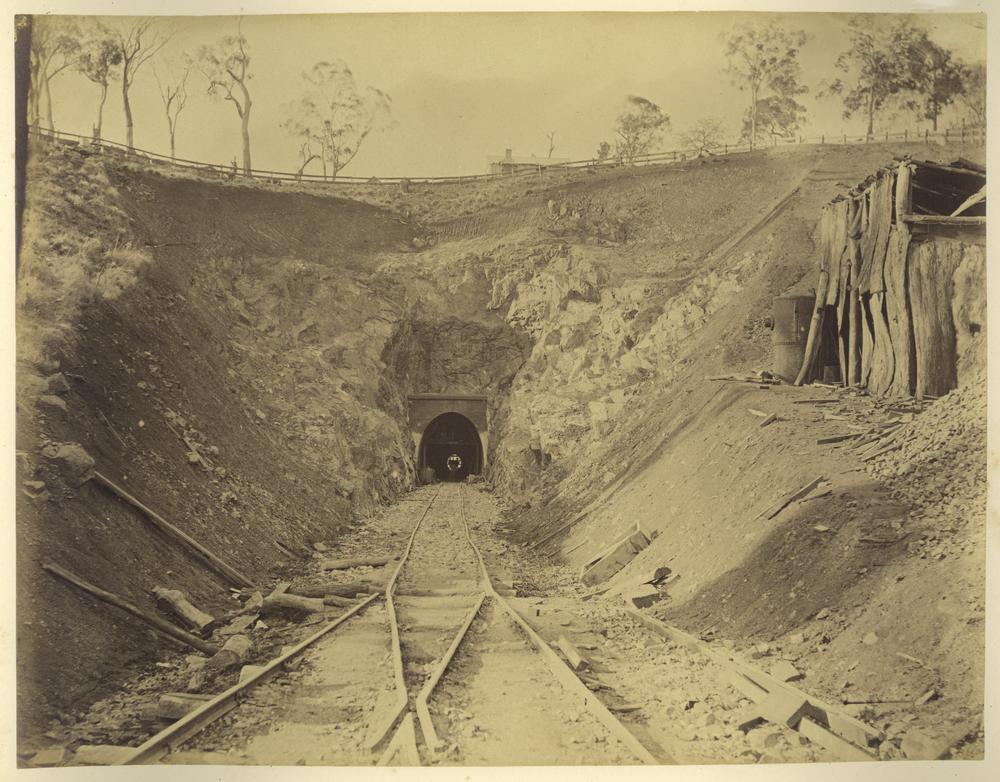
Cherry Gully Tunnel, 1882

The exploitation of the mineral resources of Queensland was recognised by political interests in Queensland as being closely linked with the development of a railway system from the period of the late 1860s and early 1870s. This connection between political decisions and economic development was further linked and with the decision taken in 1877 to construct mineral railways running from Townsville to Charters Towers, Bundaberg to Mount Perry and Maryborough to Gympie. The extension of the Southern & Western Railway from Warwick to Stanthorpe was approved along with extensions to Roma and Emerald on the same day in the Queensland Parliament, 30 August 1877. The decision to construct separate railway systems with no connection to other parts of the Queensland Railway system was to result in a proliferation of separate railways throughout Queensland, (up to eleven by 1891). The system would not be unified until 1924 with the opening of the North Coast Line between Brisbane and Cairns.

The agitation for the construction of a railway from the town of Warwick to the mining centre of Stanthorpe was a major political and social rallying point for the population of the southern tablelands. The booming tin mining area around Stanthorpe provided the impetus for the extension of the railway south from Warwick. The railway had opened to Warwick on 9 January 1871. In 1873 a survey from Warwick to Stanthorpe was begun and the 41.5 miles (66.8 km) to Stanthorpe was mapped. However this survey included two costly tunnels - one 29 chains (0.58 km) in length to save a 1.75-mile-long (2.82 km) detour and a 13-chain-long (0.26 km) tunnel to save 2.5 miles (4.0 km). The permanent survey was then pressed forward, but the line that was surveyed passed through the centre of Warwick, and as a result meant expensive earthworks in the centre of the town.

A permanent survey was completed in 1876 to the 85-mile (137 km) mark, which was 27 miles (43 km) from Warwick. On this survey there were several deviations made to shorten the overall distance of the line. In 1878 the working plans for the section from Warwick to Stanthorpe were finally prepared. Tenders were called for on the 1st and 2nd sections Warwick–Stanthorpe at the end of January 1878. Section one ran to a point 20 miles 28 1/4 chains (32.76 km) south of Warwick, whilst Section two ran 20 miles 41 1/2 chains (33.02 km) to Stanthorpe.

Section 1 was awarded to J&A Overend and Co. for £178,784 and J. Garget on Section 2 for £105,983. Construction was described in the Commissioners' Report as follows

Section 1- operations were begun May 1878 vigorously- all stone culverts and many of the concrete ones completed. Open cuttings near the tunnel were well advanced but delayed due to the very hard rock encountered. Spring and Mineral Creek bridges were delayed...an average of 784 men were employed.

By 1879 it was reported that good progress had been made on Section One, however delays were experienced due to the difficult nature of the rock at the tunnel site. On Section One the major work was the tunnel at Cherry Gully. This construction work known locally as the Big Tunnel.

Overend & Co established a major construction camp for the Cherry Gully tunnel at the works location. As mentioned previously the hard basaltic rock encountered caused great problems for the engineers and "navvies" on the line. The heading of the tunnel was not started until December 1878. To cope with these difficulties two shifts were started on the tunnelling effort.

In a new innovation for Queensland several kinds of drilling machines were experimented with but all failed. As a result of this hand drilling operations were resorted to. The use of rock drills in driving this tunnel may have been unsuccessful, however there is evidence of the use of rock drills in cuttings to the south of this tunnel as far as the head of Rosenthal Creek. The use of the rock drill is contemporary with the introduction of the Low patent rock drill into Victoria where it was used for driving the Mount Tarrengower tunnel at Maldon. Earthworks were also greater than expected due to the unstable nature of rock that was encountered.

In another innovation, and in an effort to effect savings during construction concrete was substituted as a building and lining material, instead of the more conventional brick. By reports from the contractor this was a success.

The 1879 Commissioners' Report noted:

All the stone culverts, and a large proportion of the culverts and drains in concrete have been completed. A considerable saving has been effected by the substitution of cement concrete for brickwork and masonry, both in culverts and bridges.

At the time of the Commissioners report the main works remaining were the bridges over the Condamine River, Spring Creek and the Tunnel. Section Two was a case where the going was much easier. No.2 tunnel was situated at 84 miles 20 chains (135.6 km), and in common with railway construction of the time a camp would have been situated nearby to act as labour base for its workings. On Section Two some 325 men were employed at this time.

In 1880 Minister for Works, John Macrossan visited the railway works and made an inspection as far as Garget's Camp. The Stanthorpe Border Post and Stannum Miner reported on his visit.

The construction camps were temporary townships, and were supplied with drinking establishments, sometimes a school, contractor stores even places of worship. In common with many railway communities, much of the construction workforce was drawn from Irish ancestry. Saint Patrick's Day provided a good opportunity for celebration.

Cherry Gully and Big Tunnel Races- this event, inaugurated in honour of the natal day of Ireland's patron saint, the immortal patriarch, came off, as announced on the Racecourse specially prepared between Cherry Gully and Big Tunnel, first section and despite divers obstacles... afforded a couple of days real fun for the "boyds" on the line and visitors from a distance.

In April the Stanthorpe Border Post reported that good progress had been made at the south end of the tunnel, despite the "formidable nature of the granite bars to be displaced". Garget & Co apparently were proceeding well with their construction effort despite the dangers during blasting operations.

The opening of the line through to Cherry Gully was accomplished about five weeks late, but considering the difficulties experienced was an excellent effort for all concerned. The difficulties of driving and lining the tunnel had meant that three shifts of workers were eventually required on the work. Yet, the work using concrete to line the tunnel apart from the brick crown was a first in Queensland, and in all probability Australia.

The Queensland Times reported in October 1880 that the line was expected to open to Cherry Gully on 1 December. At this time the first ballast train was reported to be making its way over the Mineral Creek bridge and all the way up to the tunnel. It was anticipated..."that within three weeks contractors will have finished one of the most difficult railways constructed in the colony".

To provide water for steam locomotives on the line between Warwick and Stanthorpe a concrete dam had been built across a large gully near "the big tunnel" in 1879, and is an early example of a concrete dam wall constructed for storage purposes. The dam had a storage capacity of 400,000 imperial gallons (1.8 ML). The water tank and pipe from the dam were gravity fed, as the dam was situated in an elevated position. The construction of a new water supply at Glen Niven in 1914 meant that the tank was no longer needed as a major watering location for locomotives. From 1950 it was only in use for emergency purposes.

The line from Cherry Gully through to Stanthorpe was opened throughout on 1 May 1881, and was taken over by the railways on 1 November 1881.

== Description ==
The centre of the Cherry Gully tunnel is situated 281 kilometres (175 mi) from Roma Street on the Southern Line between Warwick and Wallangarra. The straight tunnel is 272 metres (892 ft) long, semi-elliptical in section, and partially lined with concrete brick arches and features concrete portals.

== Heritage listing ==
Cherry Gully Tunnel was listed on the Queensland Heritage Register on 28 July 2000 having satisfied the following criteria.

The place is important in demonstrating the evolution or pattern of Queensland's history.

The Warwick-Stanthorpe railway was one of several major railway lines approved by the Queensland Parliament in 1877, to access mineral fields throughout Queensland, but particularly of the Stannum district. The tunnel allows for an interpretation of the construction techniques of the latter part of the nineteenth century, especially with the use of drilling equipment, and the experimental use of concrete, in a railway context. As part of the development of the Southern line, and the eventual inter-colonial connection with New South Wales at Wallangarra, the tunnel was one of the major engineering works undertaken on what was in the period of 1889–1930 Queensland's busiest mainline. Its survival and ongoing use allows for the interpretation of the importance of the Queensland Railway network in the economic development of Queensland.

The place is important in demonstrating the principal characteristics of a particular class of cultural places.

The Cherry Gully Tunnel is important as a substantially intact example of innovative engineering technology used in association with railway construction.
