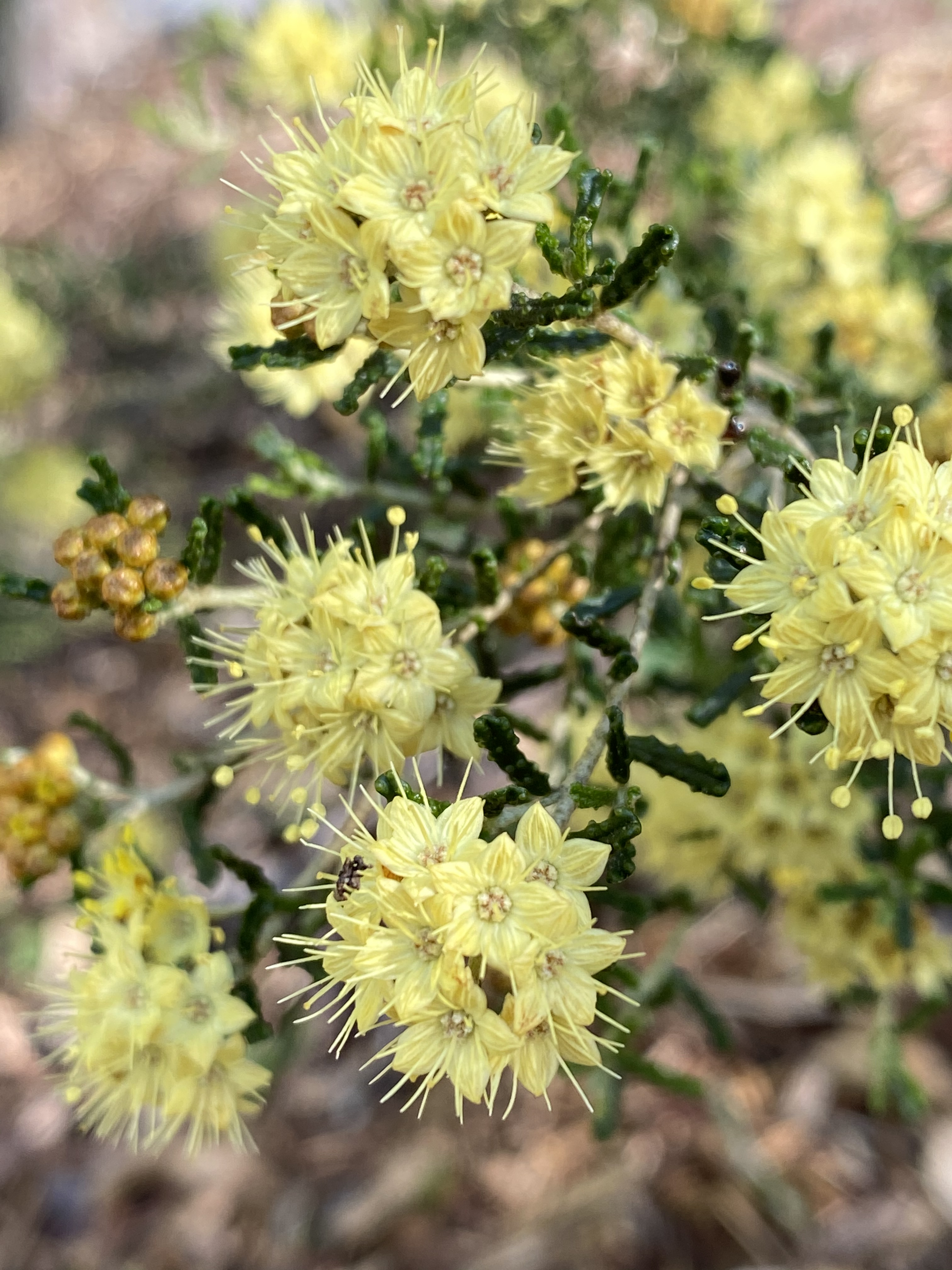
- Subspecies glandulosum in the ANBG

Scientific classification
- Kingdom: Plantae
- Clade: Tracheophytes
- Clade: Angiosperms
- Clade: Eudicots
- Clade: Rosids
- Order: Sapindales
- Family: Rutaceae
- Genus: Phebalium
- Species: P. glandulosum

Binomial name
- Phebalium glandulosum Hook.

Synonyms
- Eriostemon lepidotus var. glandulosus (Hook.) F.Muell. nom. inval., nom. nud.

= Phebalium glandulosum =

Desert phebalium

Species of plant

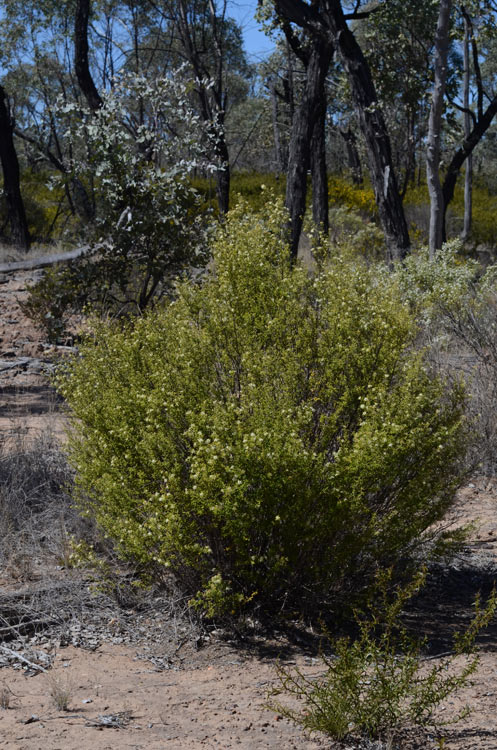
Habit in Carnarvon National Park

Phebalium glandulosum, commonly known as desert phebalium, is a species of shrub that is endemic to eastern Australia. It has glandular-warty stems covered with silvery to rust-coloured scales, wedge-shaped leaves that are scaly on the lower surface, and yellow flowers arranged in umbels on the ends of branchlets.

== Description ==
Phebalium glandulosum is a shrub that typically grows to a height of 0.5–2.5 m (1 ft 8 in – 8 ft 2 in). It has glandular-warty stems that are densely covered with silvery to rust-coloured scales. It has wedge-shaped leaves that are 3–30 mm (0.12–1.18 in) long and 1–5 mm (0.039–0.197 in) wide on a short petiole. Five to ten pale to bright yellow flowers are arranged in more or less sessile umbels on the ends of branchlets, each flower on a pedicel 2–7 mm (0.079–0.276 in) long. The calyx is hemispherical to top-shaped, 1–1.5 mm (0.039–0.059 in) long, glandular warty and covered with scales on the outside. The petals are 2.5–3 mm (0.098–0.118 in) long and overlap each other. Flowering occurs in spring and the follicles are erect and 3–4 mm (0.12–0.16 in) long.

== Taxonomy ==
The species was first formally described by English botanist William Jackson Hooker in Thomas Mitchell's Journal of an Expedition into the Interior of Tropical Australia in 1848.

In 1970, Peter G. Wilson described three subspecies of P. glandulosum in the journal Nuytsia, a further subspecies in 1998 in the same journal and in 2008 Robyn L. Giles described a further three in Australian Systematic Botany. The names of the six subspecies are accepted at the Australian Plant Census:

- P. glandulosum subsp. angustifolium Paul G.Wilson (N.S.W.)
- P. glandulosum subsp. eglandulosum (Blakely) Paul G.Wilson (Qld., N.S.W.)
- P. glandulosum Hook. subsp. glandulosum (Qld., N.S.W.)
- P. glandulosum subsp. macrocalyx R.L.Giles (S.A., Qld., N.S.W., Vic.)
- P. glandulosum subsp. nitidum Paul G.Wilson (N.S.W.)
- P. glandulosum subsp. riparium R.L.Giles (Vic., N.S.W.)

== Distribution and habitat ==
Phebalium glandulosum is widespread in heath, forest and mallee and occurs in Queensland, New South Wales, Victoria and South Australia.

- Subspecies angustifolium is mainly found in the Wollemi National Park in New South Wales.
- Subspecies eglandulosum is restricted to heath between granite rocks in the Torrington district in New South Wales and near Thulimbah in south-eastern Queensland.
- Subspecies glandulosum occurs in southern Queensland, inland New South Wales and southern South Australia.
- Subspecies macrocalyx grows in mallee woodland in western New South Wales, and in north-western Victoria where it is considered to be endangered.
- Subspecies nitidum is restricted to the Warrumbungles in north-western New South Wales where it grows on rocky basalt slopes.
- Subspecies riparium, commonly known as Snowy River phebalium, grows on rocky slopes and near streams in the Snowy Mountains, especially near the gorges of the Snowy River in Victoria and New South Wales.
