= Fleurbaix, Queensland =

Fleurbaix
- Suburb
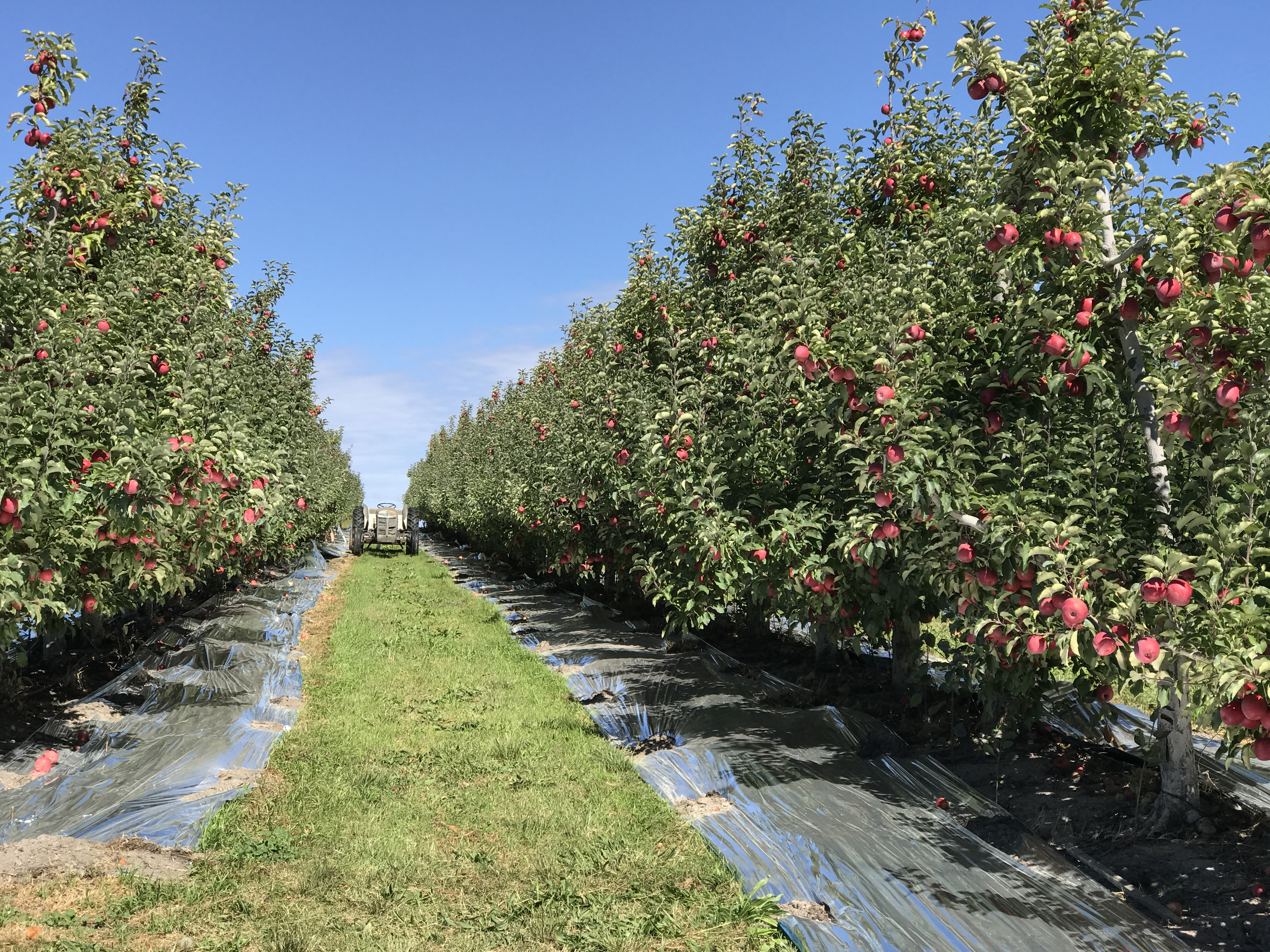
- Apple orchard, Fleurbaix,2017

- Interactive map of Fleurbaix
- Coordinates: 28.5277°S 151.9136°E
- Country: Australia
- State: Queensland
- LGA: Southern Downs Region
- Location: 18.6 km (11.6 mi) N of Stanthorpe; 49.1 km (30.5 mi) SSW of Warwick; 207 km (129 mi) SW of Brisbane

Government
  - State electorate: Southern Downs
  - Federal division: Maranoa

Area
  - Total: 6.5 km^{2} (2.5 sq mi)

Population
  - Total: 56 (2021 census)
  - Density: 8.62/km^{2} (22.3/sq mi)
- Time zone: UTC+10:00 (AEST)
- Postcode: 4375
Suburbs around Fleurbaix
Dalveen	Dalveen	Cottonvale
Pozieres	Fleurbaix	Cottonvale
Pozieres	Thulimbah	Thulimbah

Fleurbaix is a rural locality in the Southern Downs Region, Queensland, Australia. In the 2021 census, Fleurbaix had a population of 56 people.

== Geography ==
The north of the locality is hilly and undeveloped; it is part of the Herries Range. The south of the locality is also hilly. The area in-between is flatter and is used for farming. A number of creeks flow through this area.

== History ==
The locality was established as a soldier settlement area which was named after its railway station. The name was proposed by surveyor George Grant and refers to the site of French World War I Battle of Fleurbaix which involved the 5th Australian Division on 19 July 1916.

Construction commenced on the Amiens railway line in 1919 and the line was opened on 7 June 1920. The locality was served by Fleurbaix railway station (28.5257°S 151.9135°E). The line and station closed on 28 February 1974.

== Demographics ==
In the 2016 census, Fleurbaix had a population of 39 people.

In the 2021 census, Fleurbaix had a population of 56 people.

== Education ==
There are no schools in Fleurbaix. The nearest government primary schools are Pozieres State School in neighbouring Pozieres to the west and Thulimbah State School in neighbouring Thulimbah to the south-east. The nearest government secondary school is Stanthorpe State High School in Stanthorpe to the south-east.
