= Dalveen, Queensland =

Dalveen
- Town
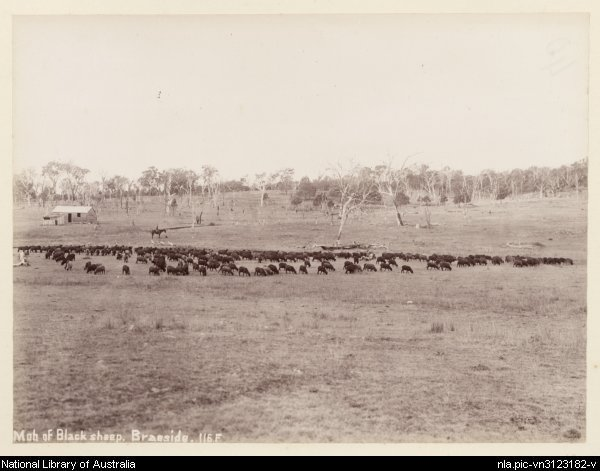
- Mob of black sheep, Braeside Homestead, 1894

- Interactive map of Dalveen
- Coordinates: 28.4894°S 151.9708°E
- Country: Australia
- State: Queensland
- LGA: Southern Downs Region
- Location: 10.9 km (6.8 mi) N of Stanthorpe; 40.8 km (25.4 mi) S of Warwick; 124 km (77 mi) S of Toowoomba; 159 km (99 mi) SW of Ipswich; 199 km (124 mi) SW of Brisbane

Government
  - State electorate: Southern Downs
  - Federal division: Maranoa

Area
  - Total: 272.1 km^{2} (105.1 sq mi)

Population
  - Total: 369 (2021 census)
  - Density: 1.3561/km^{2} (3.512/sq mi)
- Time zone: UTC+10:00 (AEST)
- Postcode: 4374
Localities around Dalveen
Palgrave	The Glen	Silverwood
Palgrave	Dalveen	Cherry Gully; Elbow Valley
Passchendaele; Pozieres	Fleurbaix; Cottonvale	Maryland (NSW); Cottonvale (NSW)

Dalveen is a rural town and locality in the Southern Downs Region, Queensland, Australia. It borders New South Wales. In the 2021 census, the locality of Dalveen had a population of 369 people.

== Geography ==
The town is located in the south of the locality.

The New England Highway enters the locality from the north (The Glen) and exits to the south (Cottonvale); it bypasses the town just to the west.

The Southern railway line enters the locality from the north-east (Silverwood) and passes through the town (being served by the Dalveen railway station 28.4882°S 151.9718°E) and then exits to the south (Cottonvale).

== History ==
The name Dalveen derives from locality name given by settler John Flint, who named it after Dalveen Pass in Lanark, Scotland.

Stanthorpe Road Provisional School opened on 12 August 1878. In 1879 it was renamed North Maryland Provisional School. In 1892 it was renamed Dalveen State School on 18 January 1892.

The section of the Southern railway line from Cherry Gully via Dalveen to Stanthorpe opened on 3 May 1881. The town's first post office was based at the Dalveen railway station and opened on 16 May 1881, replacing the post office at Cherry Gully operated from 1 January 1880 to 16 May 1881.

Cherry Gully Provisional School opened in 1900. On 1 January 1909, it became Cherry Gully State School. It closed circa 1916. It was on Old Stanthorpe Road (28.43417°S 152.03293°E), now within the locality of Dalveen.

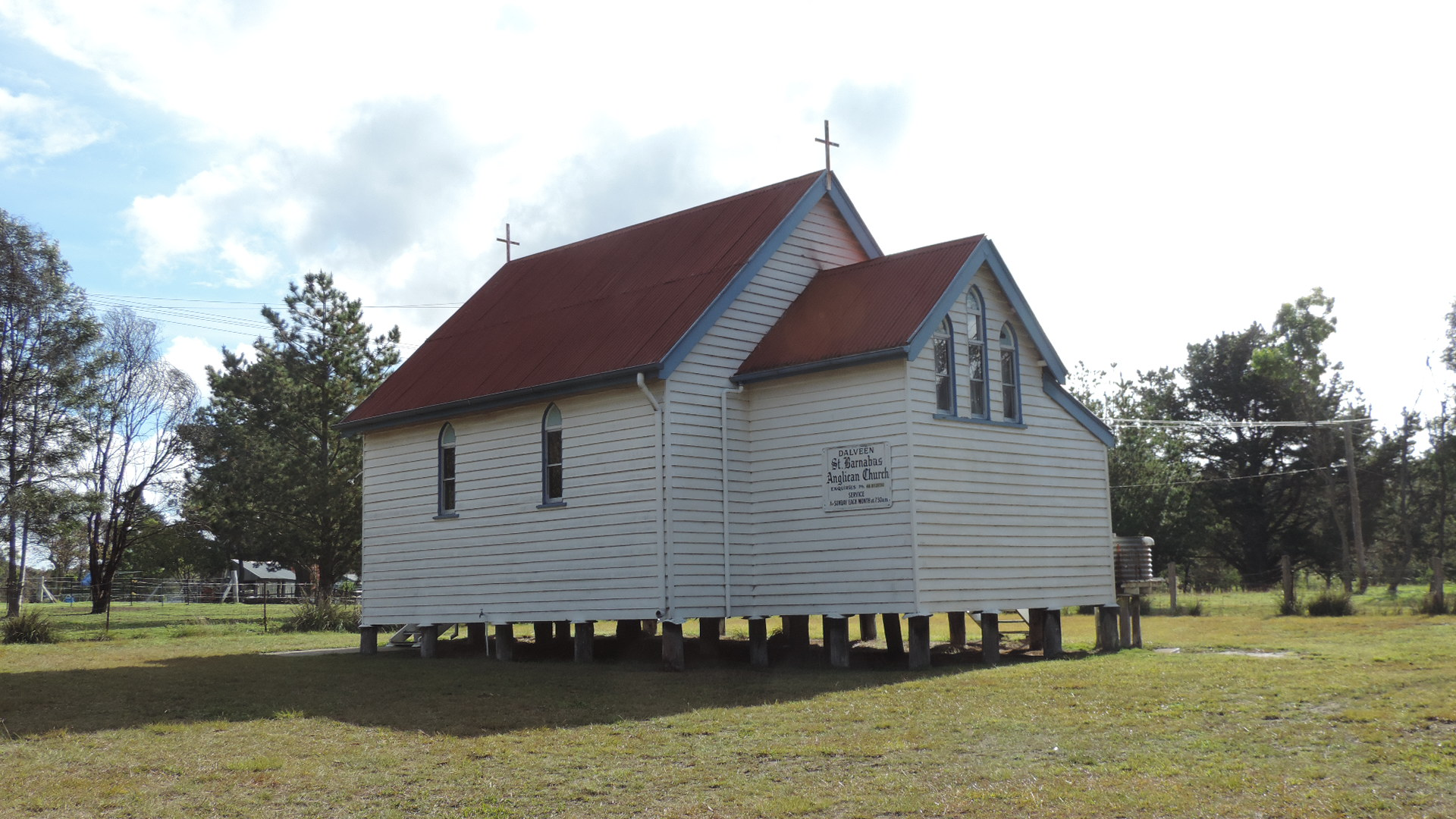
Saint Barnabas Anglican Church, 2015

St Barnabas' Anglican Church was built in 1903.

The first Dalveen Hall was completed in September 1913 by contractor J. Lang, junior. The official opening was cancelled due to the death of respected pioneer David Butler. The second Dalveen Hall officially opened on 1 April 1939. The contractor was Jack Smith, and local sawmillers the Pidgeon Brothers supported the project with timber and use of their trucks.

The Dalveen branch of the Queensland Country Women's Association was initiated by Mrs. Jean Coomber and opened in November 1924 as a sub-branch of the Condamine Valley branch. In November 1925, it decided to hold a Christmas Tree Party in December, which has become an annual event.

The Dalveen Presbyterian Church was built in 1956 by volunteers using locally-milled timber. Following the amalgamation of the Presbyterian Church and Methodist Church into the Uniting Church in Australia on 22 June 1977, it became Dalveen Uniting Church. The Methodist Church at The Summit also became a Uniting Church and services were alternated between these two churches. It held its last service on 23 June 2012 and was sold for use as a private residence.

== Demographics ==
In the 2011 census, the locality of Dalveen had a population of 346 people.

In the 2016 census, the locality of Dalveen had a population of 335 people.

In the 2021 census, the locality of Dalveen had a population of 369 people.

== Heritage listings ==
Dalveen has a number of heritage-listed sites, including:

- 28 Crystal Mountain Road (28.4009°S 151.9067°E): Braeside Homestead
- 12 McCosker Drive (28.4874°S 151.9693°E): former Butcher's Shop
- 3502 Old Stanthorpe Road: St Barnabas' Anglican Church
- 18 Pine Crescent (28.4896°S 151.9716°E): Dalveen Uniting Church
- 40 Pine Crescent (28.4899°S 151.9738°E): Dalveen State School
- Warwick-to-Wallangarra railway line (28.4889°S 151.9803°E): Dalveen Tunnel

== Education ==
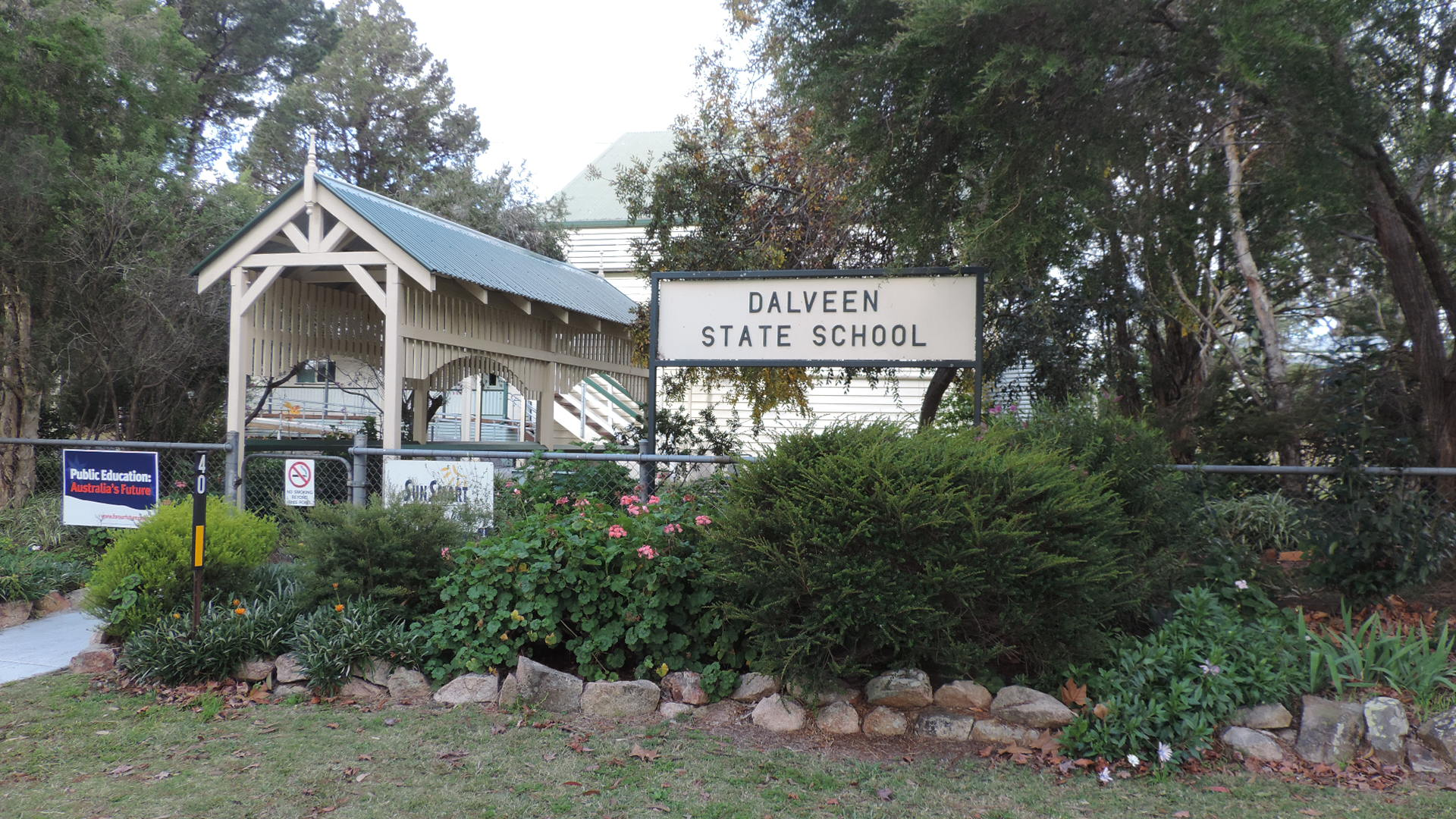
Dalveen State School, 2015

Dalveen State School is a government primary (Prep-6) school for boys and girls at 40 Pine Crescent (28.4898°S 151.9735°E). In 2018, the school had an enrolment of 16 students with 2 teachers (1 full-time equivalent) and 6 non-teaching staff (2 full-time equivalent).

There are no secondary schools in Dalveen. The nearest government secondary schools are Stanthorpe State High School in Stanthorpe to the south and Warwick State High School in Warwick to the north.

== Amenities ==
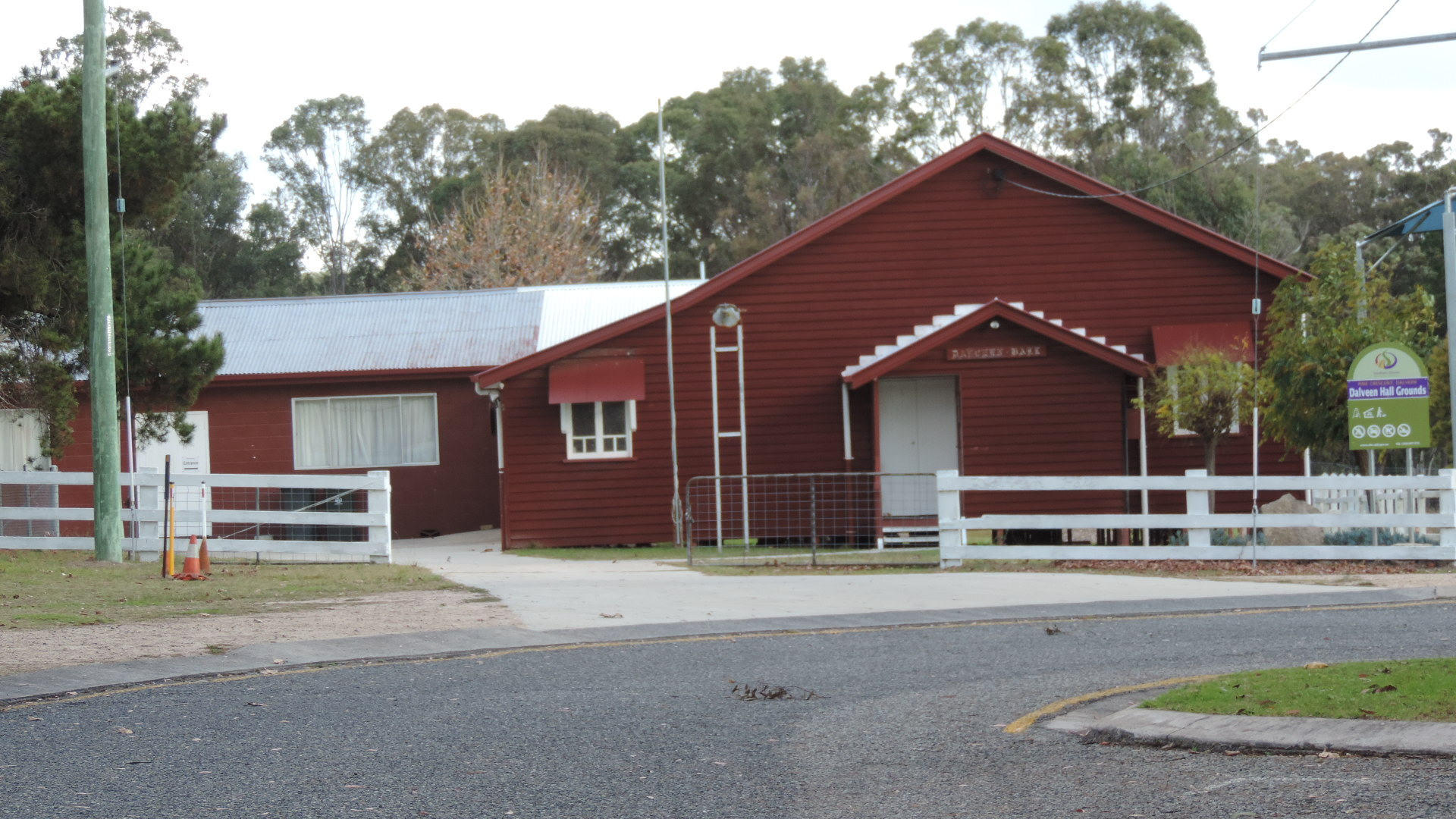
Dalveen Hall, 2015

St Barnabas' Anglican Church holds a service on the 4th Sunday of each month at 3502 Old Stanthorpe Road (28.4867°S 151.9720°E). It is part of the Stanthorpe Parish within the Anglican Diocese of Brisbane.

The Dalveen Hall is in Pine Crescent (28.4904°S 151.9734°E).

The Southern Downs Regional Council operates a mobile library service which visits the Dalveen State School in Pine Crescent.

The Dalveen branch of the Queensland Country Women's Association has its rooms at Cameron's Corner on the Old Stanthorpe Road.

== Transport ==
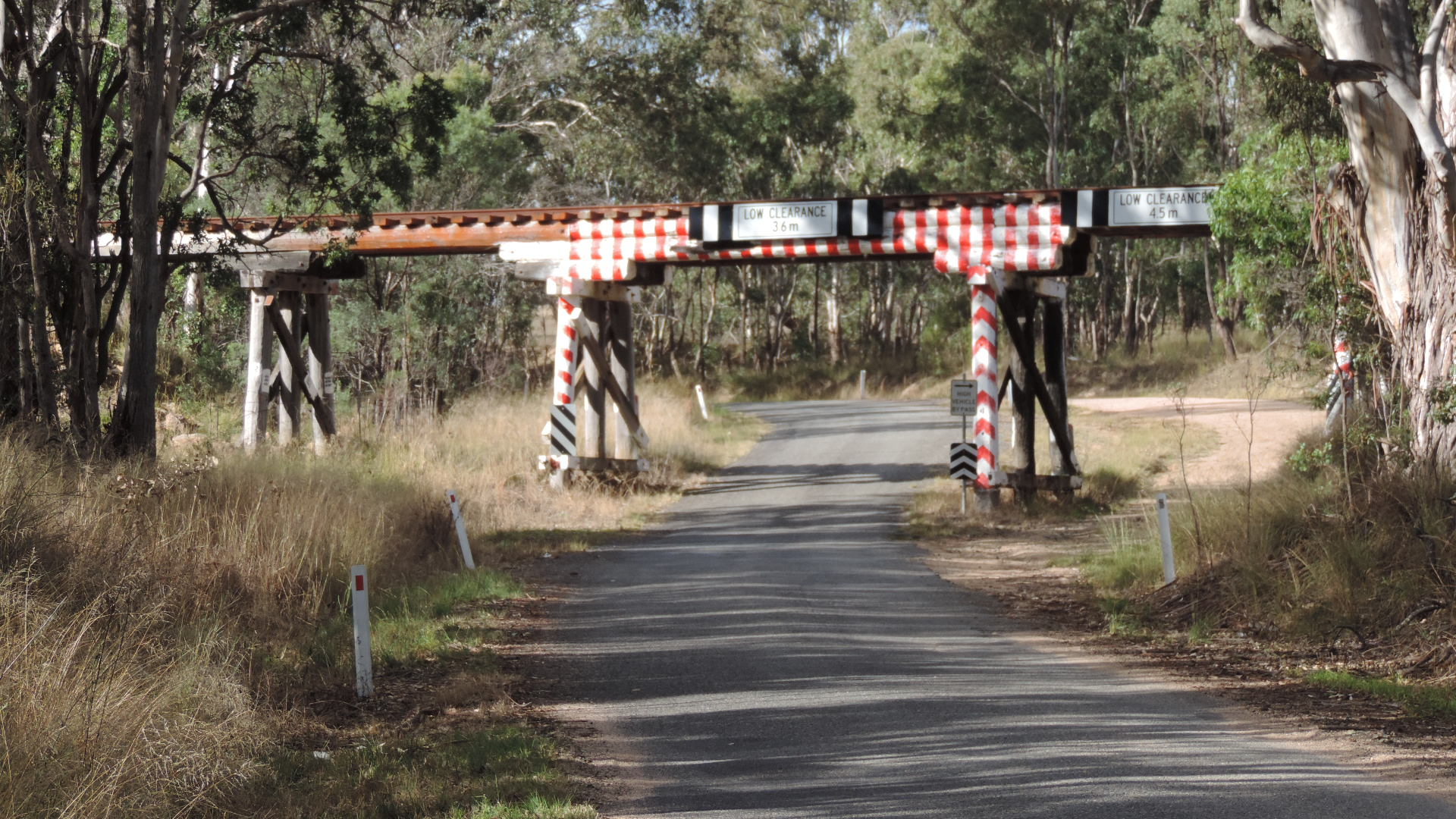
Railway bridge on the Southern line over Old Stanthorpe Road at Cherry Gully, 2015

The New England Highway passes north-south through Dalveen.

The Southern railway line passes through Dalveen; the hilly terrain necessitated two tunnels known as the Dalveen Tunnel and the Cherry Gully Tunnel and a rail bridge over Old Stanthorpe Road. The line is no longer in active service.

== Notable residents ==
- William Allan, Member of the Queensland Legislative Assembly, Member of the Queensland Legislative Council, owner of Braeside Homestead
