= Silverwood, Queensland =

Silverwood
- Suburb
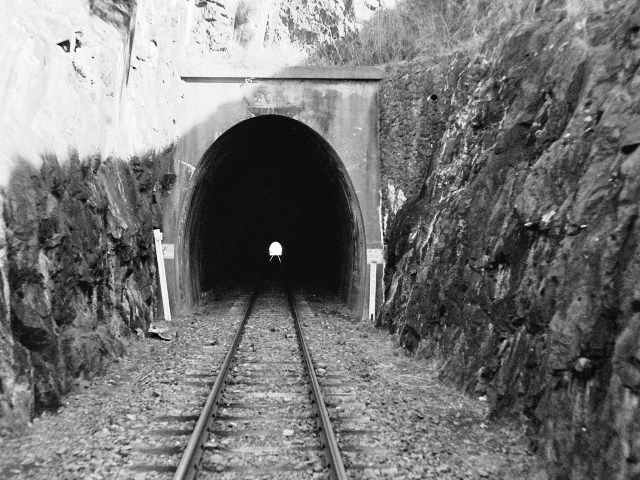
- Cherry Gully Tunnel

- Interactive map of Silverwood
- Coordinates: 28.3508°S 152.0072°E
- Country: Australia
- State: Queensland
- LGA: Southern Downs Region
- Location: 15.9 km (9.9 mi) S of Warwick; 98.2 km (61.0 mi) S of Toowoomba; 173 km (107 mi) SW of Brisbane

Government
  - State electorate: Southern Downs
  - Federal division: Maranoa

Area
  - Total: 76.9 km^{2} (29.7 sq mi)

Population
  - Total: 58 (2021 census)
  - Density: 0.754/km^{2} (1.953/sq mi)
- Time zone: UTC+10:00 (AEST)
- Postcode: 4370
Suburbs around Silverwood
Rosenthal Heights	Rosenthal Heights	Morgan Park
The Glen	Silverwood	Wildash
Dalveen	Dalveen	Cherry Gully

Silverwood is a rural locality in the Southern Downs Region, Queensland, Australia. In the 2021 census, Silverwood had a population of 58 people.

== Geography ==
Mount Silverwood is in the west of the locality (28.3622°S 151.9807°E) rising to 836 metres (2,743 ft) above sea level.

Connolly Dam is a reservoir in the centre of the locality (28.36°S 152.0016°E). Originally known as Silverwood Dam, it was renamed Connolly Dam after Dan Connolly, who was Mayor of Warwick in 1910 and again from 1924 to 1932. The dam impounds Rosenthal Creek, a tributary of the Condamine River.

The Southern railway line enters the locality from the north (Morgan Park) and meanders south through the locality, passing through the Cherry Gully tunnel, before exiting to the south (Dalveen). The locality is served by Silverwood railway station (28.3503°S 152.0176°E).

The land use is predominantly grazing on native vegetation, apart from a small amount of crop growing along Rosenthal Creek.

== History ==
A railway camp was established to build the Big Tunnel (now known as the Cherry Gully Tunnel) on the Southern railway line.

Big Tunnel Camp School opened on 4 August 1879 as a private school for children of railway workers before a teacher was supplied by the Department of Public Instruction in 1879. Approximately 60 children attended the school. It closed in 1880.

Rosenthal Middle Provisional School opened circa 1879. In 1887, it was renamed Silverwood Provisional School. On 1 January 1909, it became Silverwood State School. It closed in 1914.

== Demographics ==
In the 2016 census, Silverwood had a population of 38 people.

In the 2021 census, Silverwood had a population of 58 people.

== Heritage listings ==
Silverwood has a number of heritage sites, including:

- Cherry Gully Tunnel on the Southern railway line (28.4114°S 152.027°E)

== Education ==
There are no schools in Silverwood. The nearest government primary schools are:

- Warwick West State School in Warwick to the north
- Murray's Bridge State School in Murrays Bridge to the east
- Dalveen State School in neighbouring Dalveen to the south-west

The nearest government secondary school is Warwick State High School in Warwick to the north. There are also non-government schools in Warwick.
