= Cherry Gully, Queensland =

Cherry Gully
- Suburb
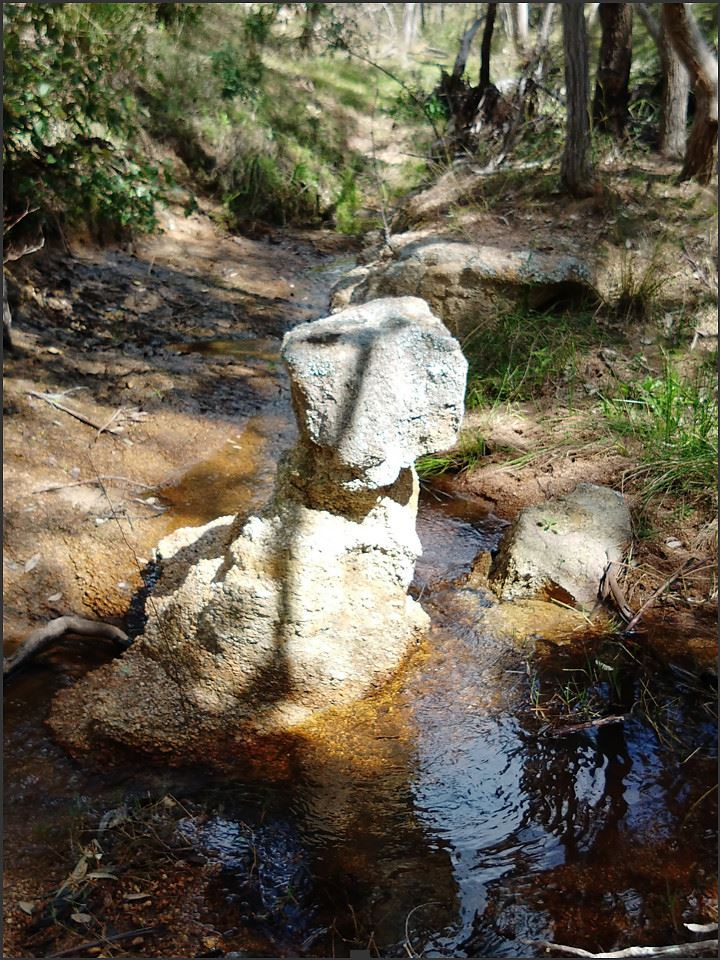
- Water sculpture, Cherry Gully, 2022

- Interactive map of Cherry Gully
- Coordinates: 28.4169°S 152.0580°E
- Country: Australia
- State: Queensland
- LGA: Southern Downs Region
- Location: 25.3 km (15.7 mi) S of Warwick; 33.8 km (21.0 mi) NNE of Stanthorpe; 108 km (67 mi) S of Toowoomba; 181 km (112 mi) SW of Brisbane

Government
  - State electorate: Southern Downs
  - Federal division: Maranoa

Area
  - Total: 15.9 km^{2} (6.1 sq mi)

Population
  - Total: 18 (2021 census)
  - Density: 1.13/km^{2} (2.93/sq mi)
- Time zone: UTC+10:00 (AEST)
- Postcode: 4370
Suburbs around Cherry Gully
Silverwood	Wildash	Elbow Valley
Silverwood	Cherry Gully	Elbow Valley
Dalveen	Elbow Valley	Elbow Valley

Cherry Gully is a rural locality in the Southern Downs Region, Queensland, Australia. In the 2021 census, Cherry Gully had a population of 18 people.

== History ==
The locality takes its name from a local gully name. There are a number of stories about the name of the gully. One story is that in mid-nineteenth century a cask of sherry fell from a wagon into the gully, with the word sherry being corrupted later to cherry. In another story, carriers stopped at the gully and drank sherry from the cargo to excess and again the word sherry was corrupted to cherry. The other story is that the gully has many wild cherry trees.

Cherry Gully Provisional School opened in 1900. On 1 January 1909, it became Cherry Gully State School. It closed circa 1916. It was on Old Stanthorpe Road (28.43417°S 152.03293°E), now within the neighbouring locality of Dalveen to the south-west.

== Demographics ==
In the 2016 census, Cherry Gully had a population of 9 people.

In the 2021 census, Cherry Gully had a population of 18 people.

== Education ==
There are no schools in Cherry Gully. The nearest government primary school is Dalveen State School in neighbouring Dalveen to the south-west. The nearest government secondary school is Warwick State High School in Warwick to the north.
