= Cottonvale, Queensland =

Cottonvale
- Suburb
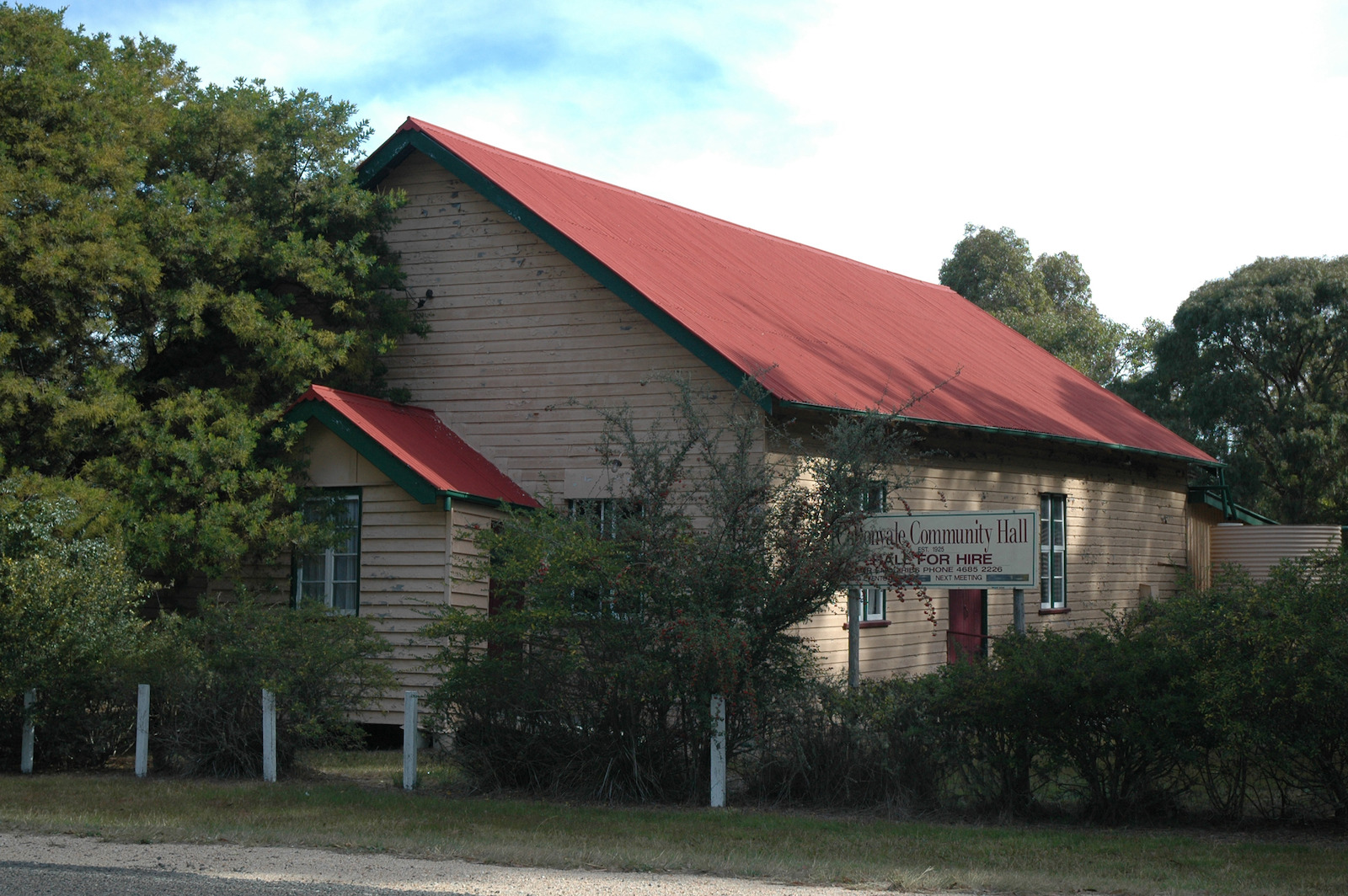
- Community Hall, 2009

- Interactive map of Cottonvale
- Coordinates: 28.5186°S 151.9391°E
- Country: Australia
- State: Queensland
- LGA: Southern Downs Region
- Location: 16.3 km (10.1 mi) N of Stanthorpe; 45.0 km (28.0 mi) SSW of Warwick; 203 km (126 mi) SW of Brisbane

Government
  - State electorate: Southern Downs
  - Federal division: Maranoa

Area
  - Total: 11.0 km^{2} (4.2 sq mi)

Population
  - Total: 153 (2021 census)
  - Density: 13.91/km^{2} (36.02/sq mi)
- Time zone: UTC+10:00 (AEST)
- Postcode: 4375
Suburbs around Cottonvale
Dalveen	Dalveen	Dalveen
Fleurbaix	Cottonvale	Cottonvale (NSW)
Thulimbah	Thulimbah	Cottonvale (NSW)

Cottonvale is a rural locality in the Southern Downs Region, Queensland, Australia. It borders New South Wales and contains the town of Cotton Vale. In the 2021 census, Cottonvale had a population of 153 people.

== Geography ==
The South Western railway line enters the locality from the north-east (Dalveen) and exits to the south (Thulimbah). The town of Cotton Vale is in the east of the locality (28.5184°S 151.9480°E) beside the now-abandoned Cotton Vale railway station (28.5214°S 151.9490°E).

The New England Highway also traverses the locality from the north-east (Dalveen) to the south-east (Thulimbah), always remaining east of the railway line and bypassing the town.

== History ==
After World War I, the area was opened up as a soldier settlement focused on fruit growing. The town was named after the Cotton Vale railway station, which was in turn named in 1920 by the Queensland Railways Department after orchardist Edward Cotton, who was believed to be the first from his district to enlist as a soldier in World War I.

Cottonvale Provisional School opened in the Cottonvale School of Arts Hall on 30 January 1958. On 28 May 1959 it became Cottonvale State School. It was mothballed on 31 December 2004 and closed on 24 August 2005. It was at 11 Cottonvale School Road (28.5162°S 151.9477°E).

== Demographics ==
In the 2016 census, Cottonvale had a population of 148 people.

In the 2021 census, Cottonvale had a population of 153 people.

== Education ==
There are no schools in Cottonvale. The nearest government primary schools are Thulimbah State School in neighbouring Thulimbah to the south and Dalveen State School in neighbouring Dalveen to the north. The nearest government secondary school is Stanthorpe State High School in Stanthorpe to the south.
