= Connolly Dam =

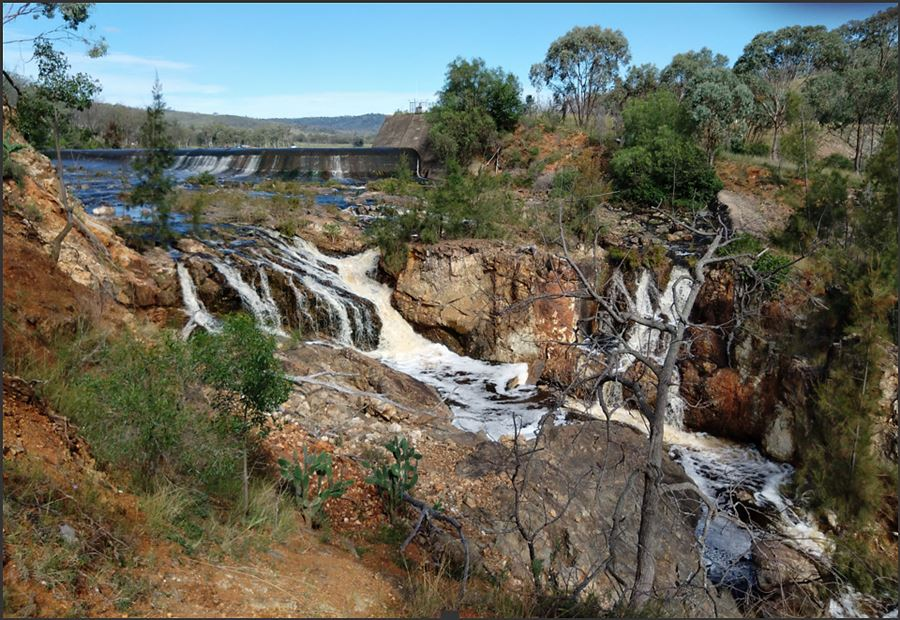
- Rosenthal Creek after passing over Connolly Dam, 2022

- Location of the Connolly Dam in Queensland
- Country: Australia
- Location: Darling Downs, Queensland
- Coordinates: 28°21′36″S 152°00′06″E
- Purpose: Potable water supply
- Status: Operational
- Opening date: 1927
- Operator: Southern Downs Regional Council

Dam and spillways
- Type of dam: Rock-fill dam
- Impounds: Rosenthall Creek; Fitz Creek
- Height: 22 m (72 ft)
- Height (thalweg): 174 m (571 ft)
- Length: 145 m (476 ft)
- Dam volume: 115×10^{3} m^{3} (4.1×10^{6} cu ft)
- Spillway type: Uncontrolled
- Spillway capacity: 540 m^{3}/s (19,000 cu ft/s)

Reservoir
- Total capacity: 2,157 ML (1,749 acre⋅ft)
- Catchment area: 134 km^{2} (52 sq mi)
- Surface area: 52–55 ha (130–140 acres)
- Maximum water depth: 16 m (52 ft)

The Connolly Dam, also called the Silverwood Dam, is a rock–fill embankment dam with an un–gated spillway across the Rosenthall Creek and the Fitz Creek that is located in the locality of Silverwood, Southern Downs Region, part of the Darling Downs district of Queensland, Australia. The main purpose of the dam is for potable water supply of the Southern Downs Region. It discharges via Rosenthal Creek to join the Condamine River in east Warwick.

== History ==
The dam was built to supply water to the town of Warwick. The first sod was turned on Friendly Societies' Day in September 1926 by the Minister for Lands Thomas Dunstan. It was completed in 1927.

Originally known as Silverwood Dam, in September 1926, it was renamed Connolly Dam after Dan Connolly, who was Mayor of Warwick in 1910 and again from 1924 to 1932 and who had instigated in the creation of the dam.

== Location and features ==
The dam is located in a mountain valley 15 kilometres (9.3 mi) southeast of Warwick and approximately 20 kilometres (12 mi) north of the Border Rivers region that generally defines the border between Queensland and New South Wales.

The rock–fill dam structure is 21 metres (69 ft) high and 145 metres (476 ft) long. The 115-thousand-cubic-metre (4.1×10^{6} cu ft) dam wall holds back the 2,157-megalitre (1,749 acre⋅ft) reservoir when at full capacity. The uncontrolled un-gated spillway has a discharge capacity of 710 cubic metres per second (25,000 cu ft/s). The dam is managed by the Southern Downs Regional Council.

== Recreational activities ==
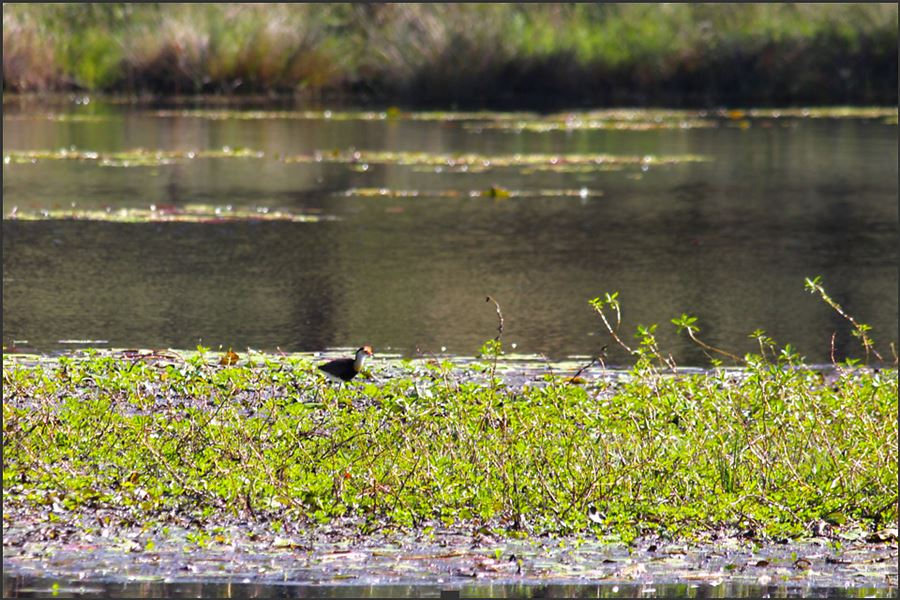
Dusky moorhen on lily pads in Connolly Dam, 2022

Golden perch, silver perch, Murray cod, spangled perch and eel-tailed catfish may be found in the reservoir. Golden perch dominate most catches for lure/fly anglers, while silver perch and eel-tailed catfish (dewfish) are more of a bait fishing prospect. A stocked impoundment permit is required to fish in the dam.

Connolly Dam is an "electric only" impoundment (outboards must be taken off) meaning only electric or manually powered craft may be used. Only members of the Warwick District Recreational Fish Stocking Association (WDRFSA) may take craft on the waterway, and only on weekends between sunrise and sunset. WDRFSA memberships are available from the caretaker at the dam currently costing $10. There is no boat ramp but there are many ideal locations around the dam to launch a boat. Membership cards must be shown to the caretaker prior to launching watercraft.

Camping is permitted at Connolly Dam. Toilets are provided at the lookout adjacent to dam wall.

== See also ==
- List of dams in Queensland
- Border Rivers
