= Thulimbah, Queensland =

Thulimbah
- Town
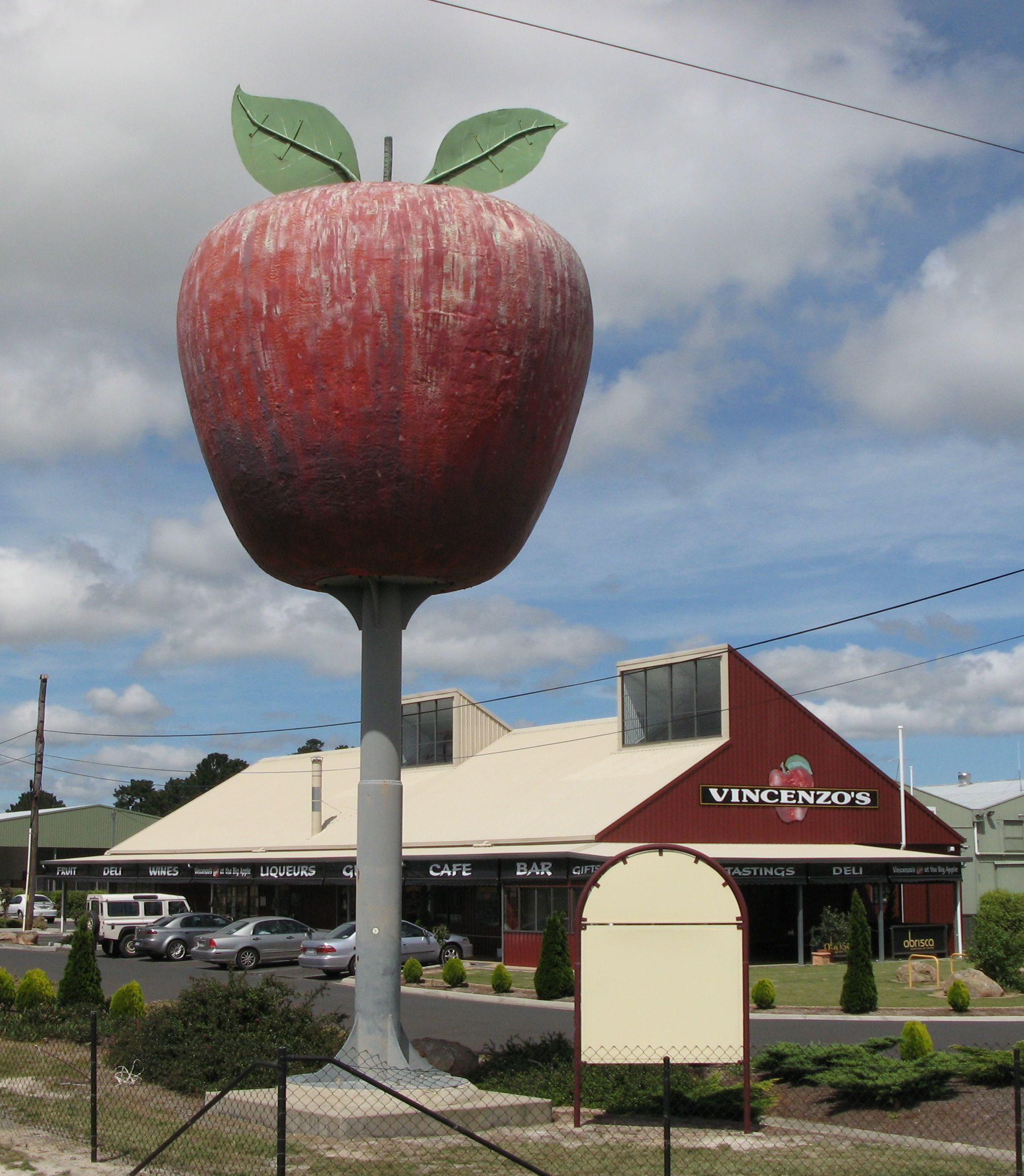
- The Big Apple

- Interactive map of Thulimbah
- Coordinates: 28.5513°S 151.9486°E
- Country: Australia
- State: Queensland
- LGA: Southern Downs Region
- Location: 13 km (8.1 mi) N of Stanthorpe; 49 km (30 mi) S of Warwick; 206 km (128 mi) SW of Brisbane

Government
  - State electorate: Southern Downs
  - Federal division: Maranoa

Area
  - Total: 13.4 km^{2} (5.2 sq mi)
- Elevation: 924 m (3,031 ft)

Population
  - Total: 351 (2021 census)
  - Density: 26.19/km^{2} (67.8/sq mi)
- Time zone: UTC+10:00 (AEST)
- Postcode: 4376
Localities around Thulimbah
Fleurbaix	Cottonvale	Cottonvale (NSW)
Pozieres	Thulimbah	Maryland (NSW)
Pozieres	The Summit	Maryland (NSW)

Thulimbah is a rural town and locality in the Southern Downs Region, Queensland, Australia. In the 2021 census, the locality of Thulimbah had a population of 351 people. It borders New South Wales.

== Geography ==
Thulimbah is located on the Darling Downs. The town is on the New England Highway, 206 kilometres (128 mi) from the state capital, Brisbane.

== History ==
The name of the town derives from the name of the railway station used from 1883, meaning "place of water" in an Aboriginal language.

Bentinck State School opened on 28 September 1914. On 30 August 1916 it was renamed Thulimbah State School. A preschool was added in 1976.

There was originally another district in Queensland called Thulimbah, which was a source of confusion to many people. Eventually the problem was resolved in 1916 by renaming the other district Barney View (due to its location beside Mount Barney).

== Demographics ==
In the 2006 census, the locality of Thulimbah and the surrounding area had a population of 534 people.

In the 2016 census, the locality of Thulimbah had a population of 319 people.

In the 2021 census, the locality of Thulimbah had a population of 351 people.

== Economy ==
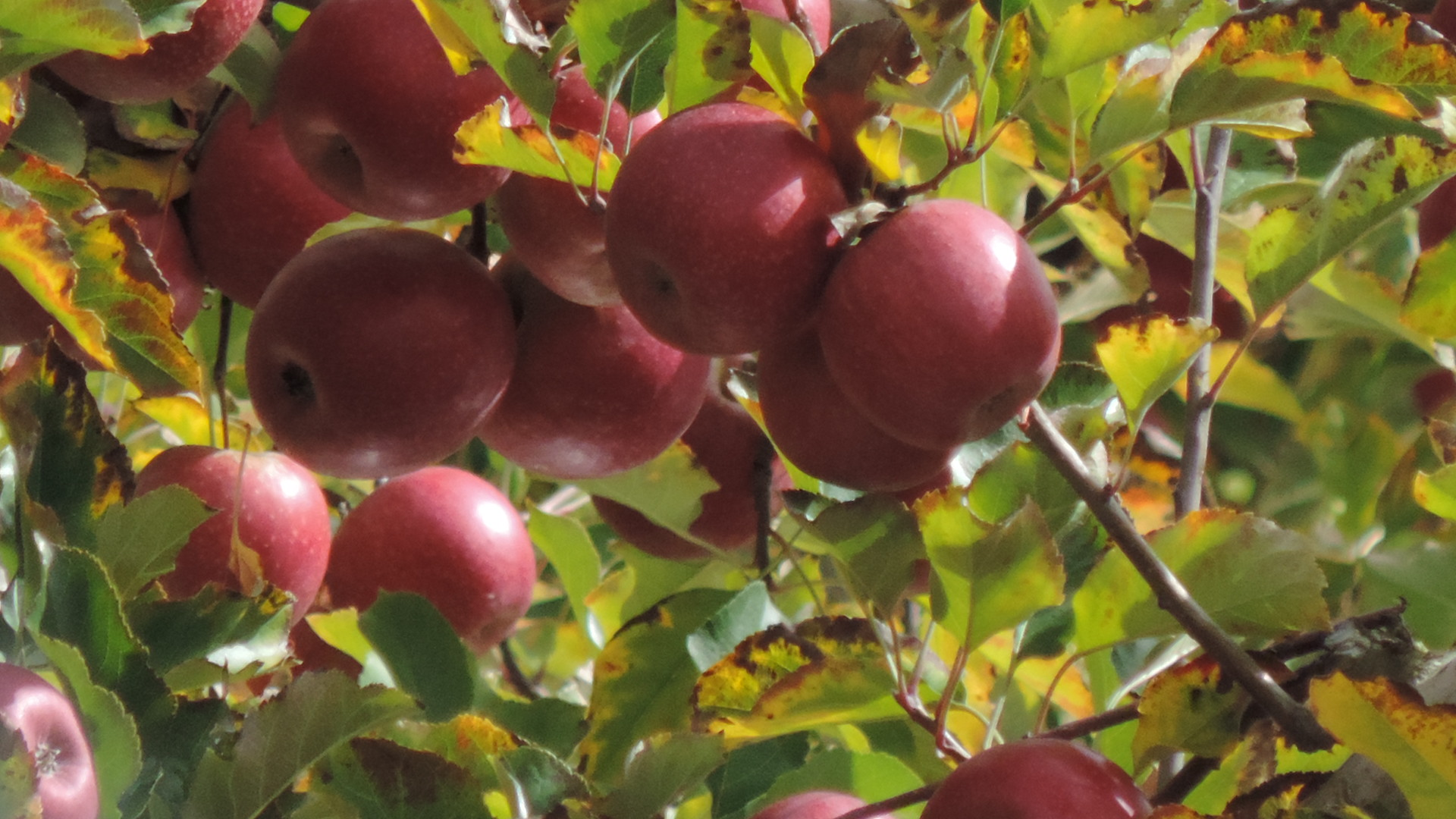
Pink lady apples, orchard in Thulimbah, 2015

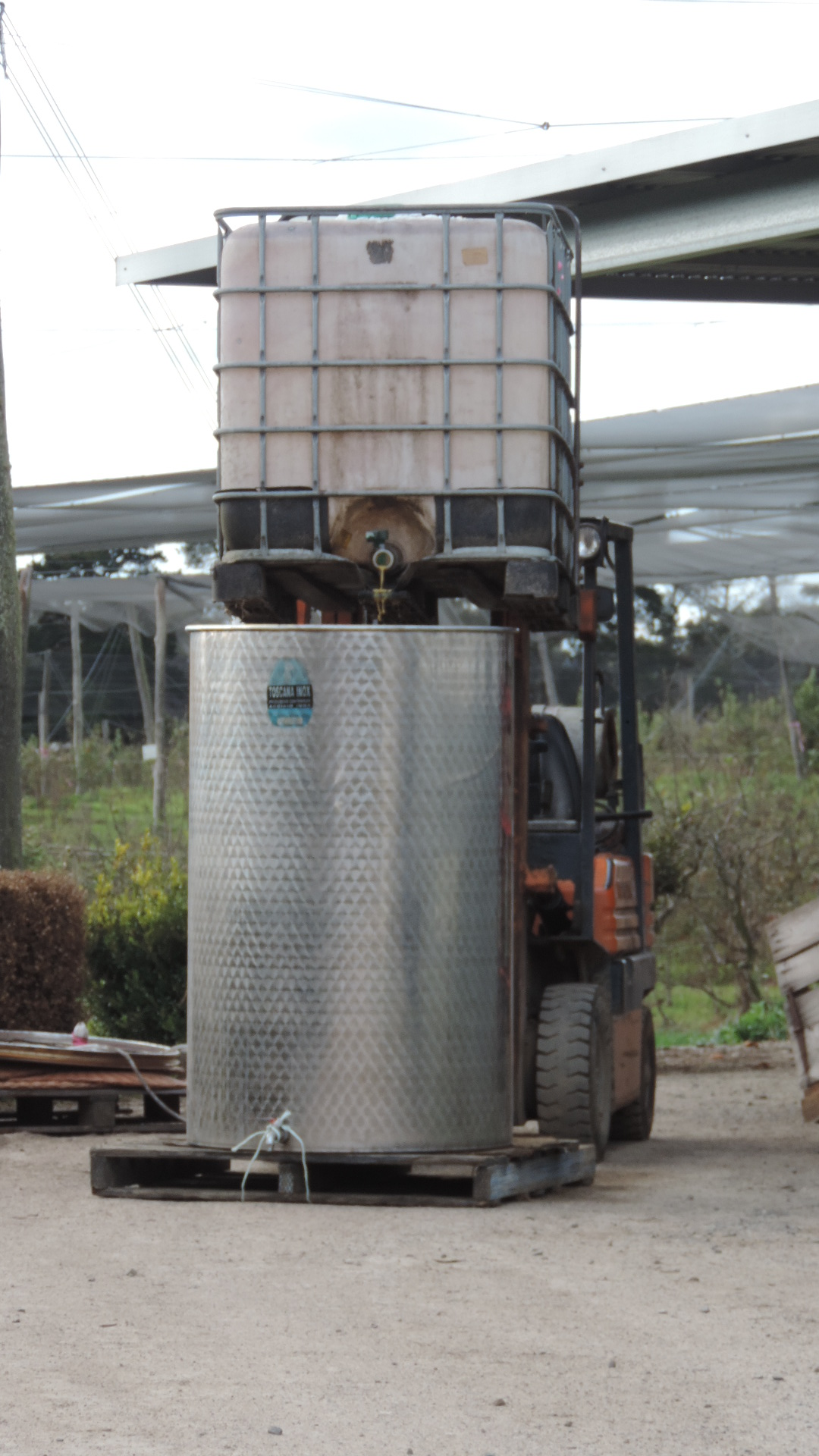
Pressing apples, Suttons Juice Factory and Cidery, Thulimbah, 2015

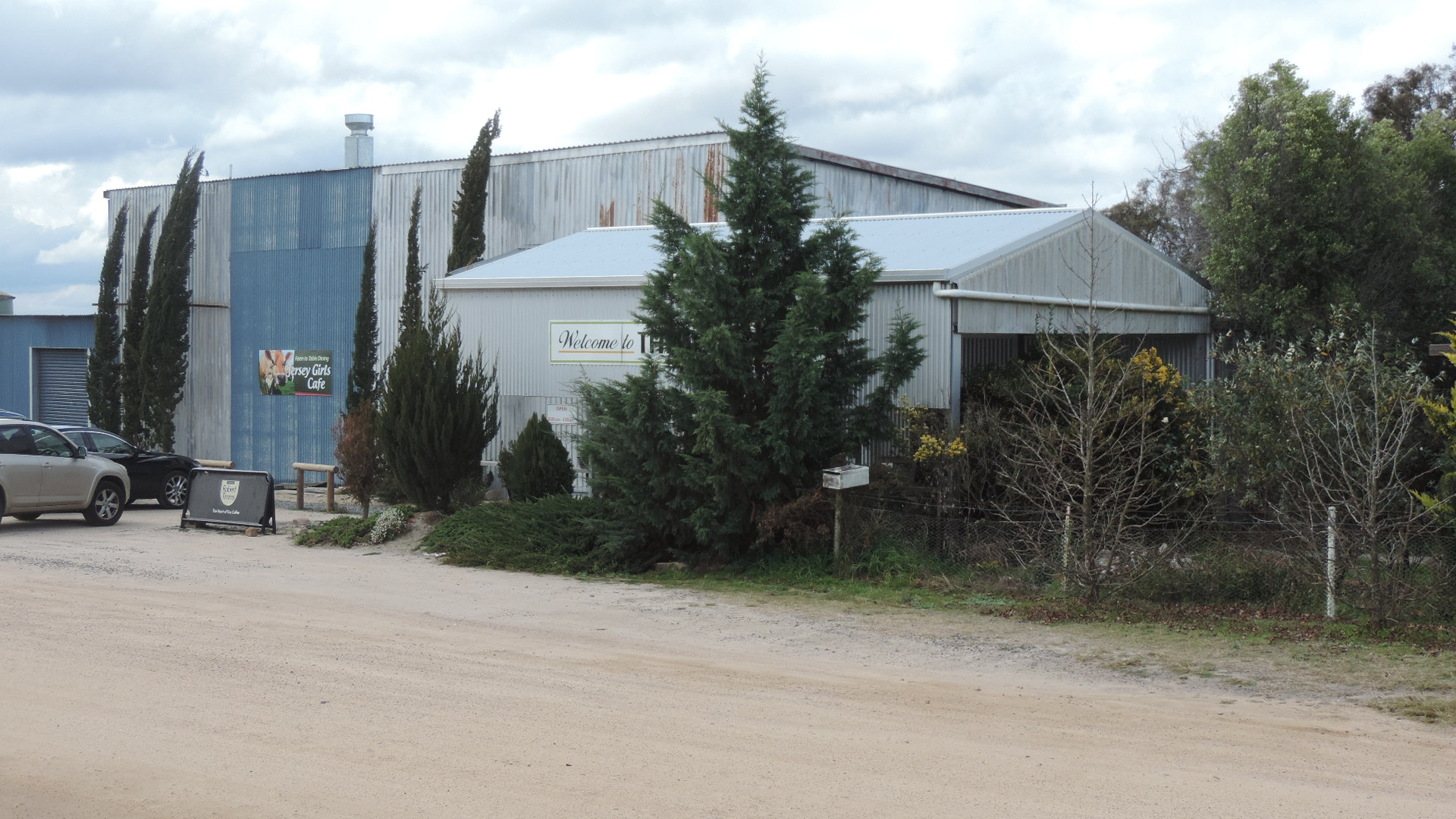
Stanthorpe Cheese and Jersey Girls Cafe, Thulimba, 2015

Thulimbah is a fruit-growing area, including apples, pears, cherries, grapes and oranges for both table and wine-making. There are a number of wineries, many with cellar door outlets in the area. Other local food producers also offer tastings, sales and cafe menus.

== Education ==
Thulimbah State School is a government primary (Prep-6) school for boys and girls at 146 Thulimbah School Road (28.5365°S 151.9361°E). In 2018, the school had an enrolment of 31 students with 4 teachers (3 full-time equivalent) and 5 non-teaching staff (2 full-time equivalent).

There are no secondary schools in Thulimbah. The nearest government secondary school is Stanthorpe State High School in Stanthorpe to the south.

== Attractions ==
The town is home to one of Australia's big things, a tourist attraction known as the "Big Apple".
