= Stanthorpe Border Post =

Australian newspaper

- Type: Biweekly newspaper
- Format: Tabloid
- Owner: News Corp Australia
- Founded: 20 July 1872
- Language: English
- Headquarters: Stanthorpe, Queensland, Australia; 7/128 High Street; Stanthorpe QLD 4380
- Circulation: 1,793 Tuesday & Thursday
- Website: www.stanthorpeborderpost.com.au

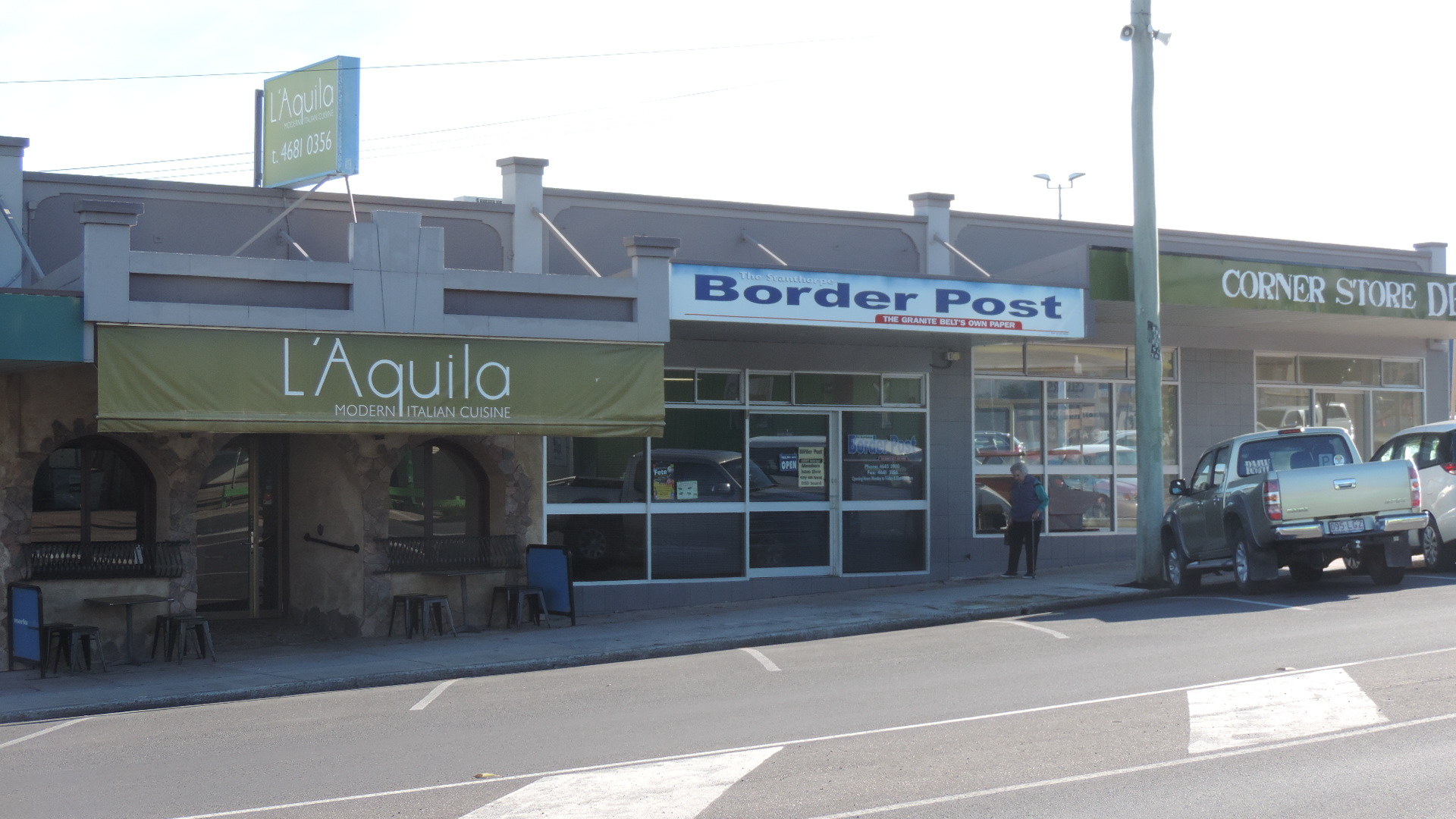
Office of the Stanthorpe Border Post, Maryland Street, Stanthorpe, 2015

The Stanthorpe Border Post was a newspaper published in Stanthorpe, Queensland, Australia. It was published twice weekly. The newspaper published its final print edition in June 2020 but continues in an online-only format.

== History ==
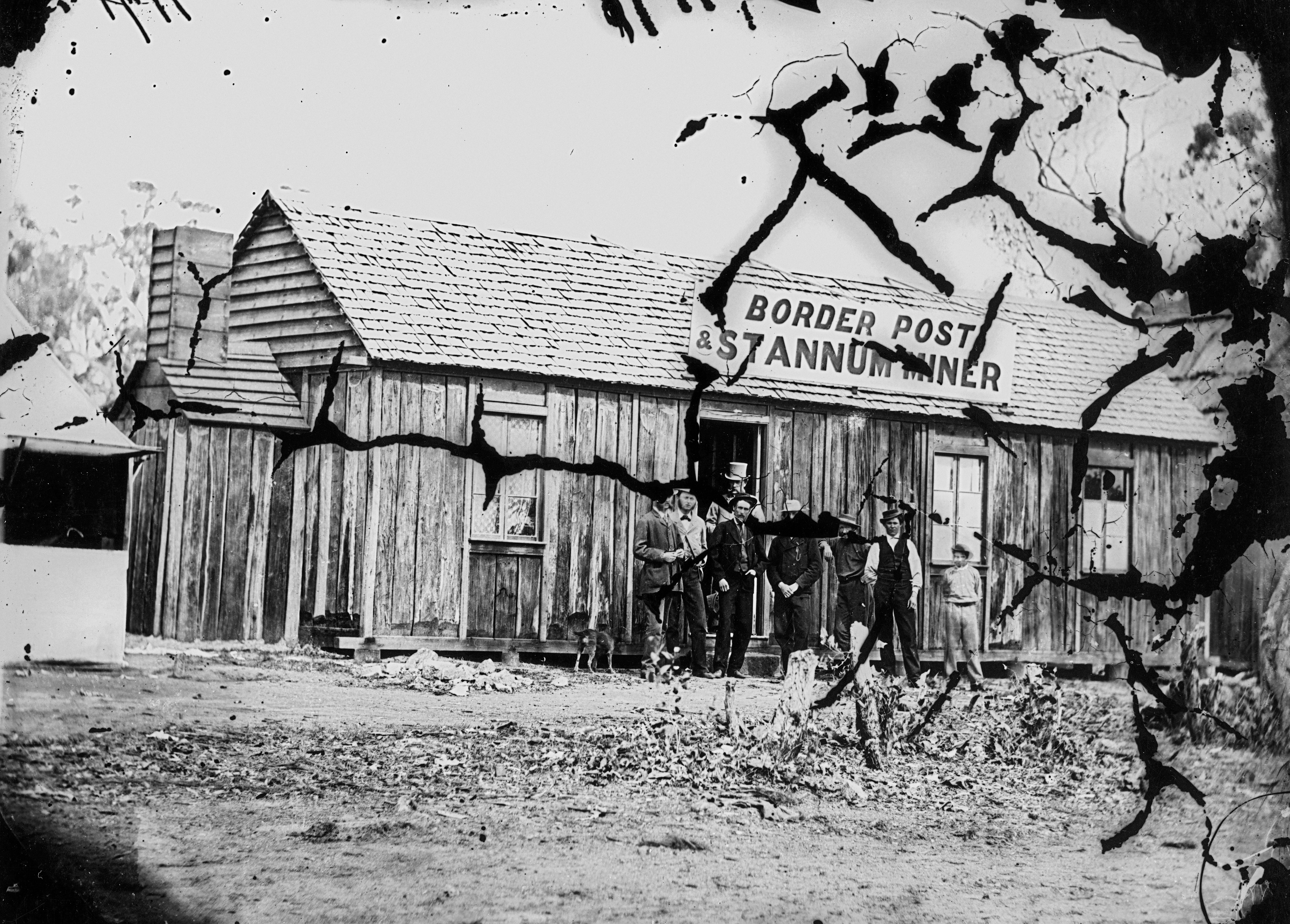
Offices of the Border Post and Stannum Miner near the corner of Maryland and Folkestone Street, Stanthorpe, 1872

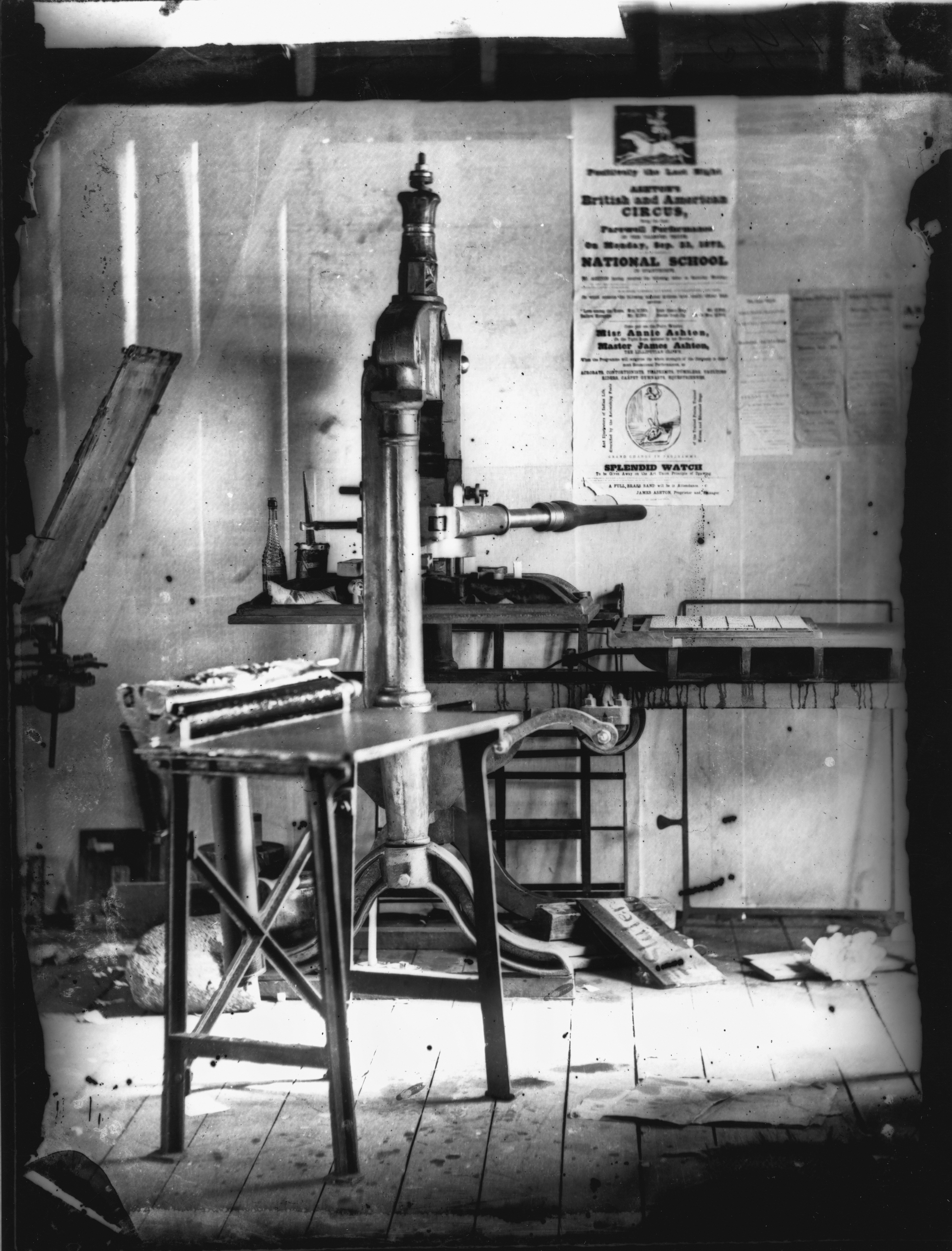
Printing works of the Border Post Stannum Miner newspaper, 1872

The newspaper Border Post and Stannum Miner was first published on 20 July 1872 in Stanthorpe on foolscap paper. Later it was published on broadsheet. In 1971 the title was simplified to Border Post and the newspaper printed as a tabloid.

The title Stannum Miner was then adopted by the Stanthorpe and District Historical Society as the name for their journal (formerly known as the Bulletin).

In 1994, Australian Provincial Newspapers acquired a controlling interest in the Border Post.

Along with many other regional Australian newspapers owned by NewsCorp, the newspaper ceased print editions in June 2020 and became an online-only publication from 26 June 2020.
