= Shire of Warwick =

- Local government area
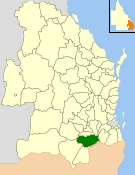
- Location within Queensland

- Country: Australia
- State: Queensland
- Region: Darling Downs
- Established: 1994
- Council seat: Warwick

Area
  - Total: 4,422.3 km^{2} (1,707.5 sq mi)

Population
  - Total: 21,417 (2006 census)
  - Density: 4.84296/km^{2} (12.5432/sq mi)
- Website: Shire of Warwick
LGAs around Shire of Warwick
Millmerran	Clifton	Gatton, Laidley
Inglewood	Shire of Warwick	Boonah
Stanthorpe	Tenterfield (NSW)	Tenterfield (NSW)

The Shire of Warwick was a local government area in the Darling Downs region of Queensland, Australia. The administrative centre and major town of the shire was the town of Warwick.

== History ==
On 19 March 1992, the Electoral and Administrative Review Commission, created two years earlier, produced its report External Boundaries of Local Authorities, and recommended that local government boundaries in the Warwick area be rationalised into three new local government areas. That recommendation was not implemented, but the City of Warwick was merged with the Shires of Allora, Glengallan and Rosenthal to form the new Shire of Warwick. The Local Government (Allora, Glengallan, Rosenthal and Warwick) Regulation 1994 was gazetted on 20 May 1994. On 25 June, an election was held for the new council, and on 1 July 1994, the Shire of Warwick was established.

Under the local council amalgamation programme instigated by the Queensland Government in 2007, the Shires of Stanthorpe and Warwick were merged in March 2008 to create the Southern Downs Region.

== Towns and localities ==
The Shire of Warwick included the following settlements:

Warwick area:

- Warwick

Allora area:

- Allora
- Berat
- Clintonvale
- Deuchar
- Ellinthorp
- Goomburra
- Hendon
- Mount Marshall
- Talgai
- Willowvale^{*}

Glengallan area:

- Killarney
- Canningvale
- Elbow Valley
- Emu Vale
- Freestone
- Gladfield
- Glengallan
- Junabee
- Maryvale
- Morgan Park
- Mount Colliery
- Mount Sturt
- Mount Tabor
- Sladevale
- Swanfels
- Tannymorel
- The Falls
- Tregony
- Wiyarra
- Womina
- Yangan

Rosenthal area:

- Rosenthal Heights
- Allan
- Cunningham
- Dalveen
- Greymare
- Karara
- Leslie
- Leslie Dam
- Leyburn
- Palgrave
- Pratten
- Rosehill
- Thane
- Wheatvale

^{*} Not to be confused with Willow Vale, Queensland

== Population ==
Year	Population
1986	17,127*
1991	18,732*
1996	19,967
2001	20,694
2006	21,417

* From time series data

== Mayors ==
- Bruce Green
- Ron Bellingham

== Election results ==
=== 1933 ===
1933 Queensland local elections: Warwick
Party	Candidate	Votes	%	±%
	H. H. Dwight (elected)	2,233		
	H. Tucker (elected)	2,207		
	L. E. Evans (elected)	2,054		
	P. D. Kelly (elected)	2,047		
	R. G. Berthelsen (elected)	1,979		
	A. Marshall (elected)	1,971		
	A. G. Winchester (elected)	1,859		
	T. Ingrams (elected)	1,656		
	E. Parker	1,480		
	J. W. Gilham	1,432		
	J. Sanderson	1,386		
	J. R. Hackwood	1,199		
	T. E. Balzer	1,148		
	T. W. Webber	1,111		
	P. Rebelt	984		
	J. K. Murdock	956		

- The Independent Reform Party won a "sweeping majority" over the Citizens' United Party
