= Shire of Glengallan =

Coordinates: 28°13′16″S 152°01′15.3″E

Shire of Glengallan Queensland
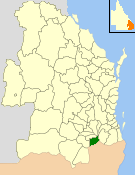
- Location within Queensland
- Population: 3,966 (1991 census)
  - Density: 2.2947/km^{2} (5.9434/sq mi)
- Established: 1879
- Area: 1,728.3 km^{2} (667.3 sq mi)
- Council seat: Warwick
- Region: Darling Downs
LGAs around Shire of Glengallan:
Warwick	Allora	Boonah
Rosenthal	Shire of Glengallan	Boonah
Stanthorpe	Tenterfield (NSW)	Tenterfield (NSW)

The Shire of Glengallan was a local government area south and east of the regional centre of Warwick in the Darling Downs region of Queensland. The shire, administered from Warwick, covered an area of 1,699.6 square kilometres (656.2 sq mi), and existed as a local government entity from 1879 until 1994, when it was dissolved and amalgamated with City of Warwick, Shire of Rosenthal and Shire of Allora to form the Shire of Warwick.

== History ==
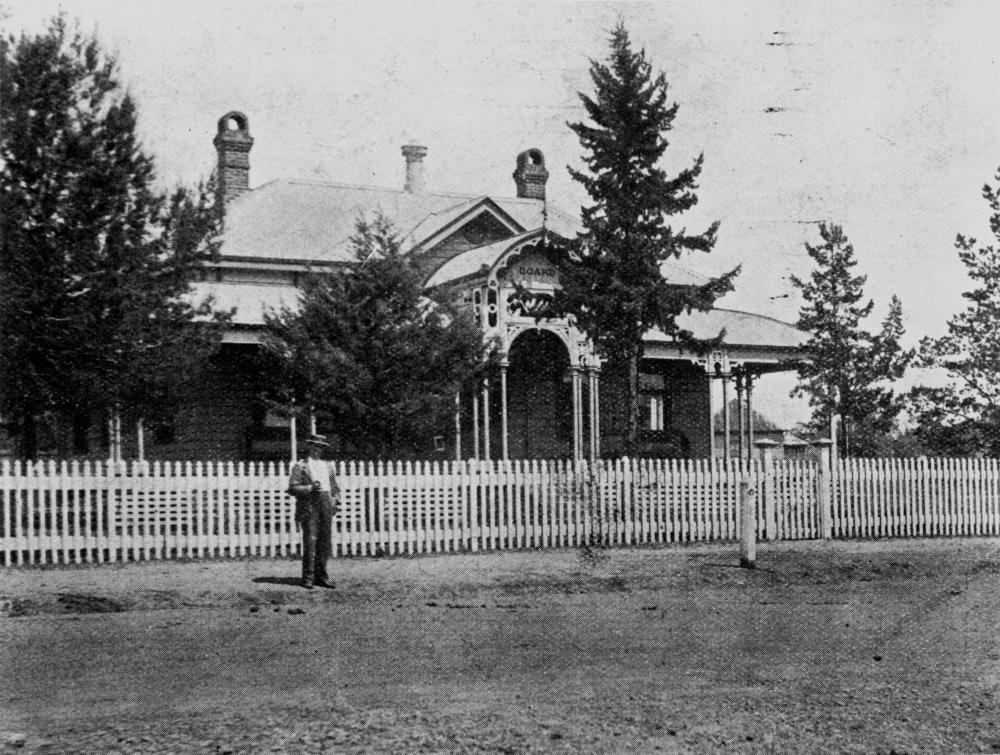
Glengallan Divisional Board building, Warwick, 1901

On 11 November 1879, the Glengallan Division was created as one of 74 divisions within Queensland under the Divisional Boards Act 1879 with a population of 2608.

With the passage of the Local Authorities Act 1902, it became a Shire on 31 March 1903. Its offices were located at Yangan Road, Warwick.

On 19 March 1992, the Electoral and Administrative Review Commission, created two years earlier, produced its report External Boundaries of Local Authorities, and recommended that local government boundaries in the Warwick area be rationalised into 3 new local government areas. That recommendation was not implemented, but the outcome was that the Shire of Glengallan was merged with the Shires of Allora and Rosenthal and the City of Warwick to form a new Shire of Warwick. The Local Government (Allora, Glengallan, Rosenthal and Warwick) Regulation 1994 was gazetted on 20 May 1994. On 25 June, an election was held for the new council, and on 1 July 1994, the Shire of Glengallan was abolished.

== Towns and localities ==
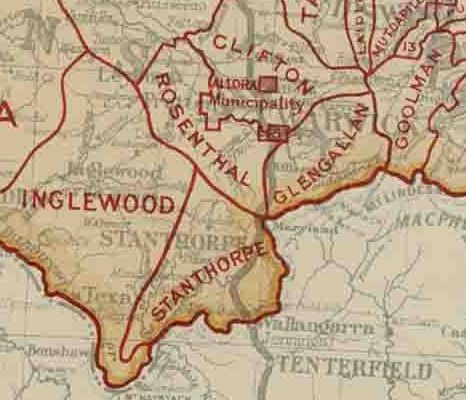
Map of Glengallan Division and adjacent local government areas, March 1902. Legend: Warwick Municipality (5), Normanby Division (13)

The Shire of Glengallan included the following settlements:

- Killarney
- Canningvale
- Elbow Valley
- Emu Vale
- Freestone
- Gladfield
- Glengallan
- Junabee
- Maryvale
- Morgan Park
- Mount Colliery
- Mount Sturt
- Mount Tabor
- Sladevale
- Swanfels
- Tannymorel
- The Falls
- Tregony
- Wiyarra
- Womina
- Yangan

== Chairmen ==
- 1880: Mr. J. Affleck
- 1894: Thomas McGahan
- 1927: T. J. Howell

== Election results ==
=== 1933 ===
1933 Queensland local elections: Glengallan
Party	Votes	%	Swing	Seats	Change
Independent	6,692	100.0		11	Steady
Formal votes	6,692	100.0			

== Population ==
Year	Population
1933	6,334
1947	5,269
1954	4,639
1961	4,388
1966	3,906
1971	3,410
1976	3,491
1981	3,611
1986	3,688
1991	3,966
1996	4,041
