= Yangan Masonic Hall =

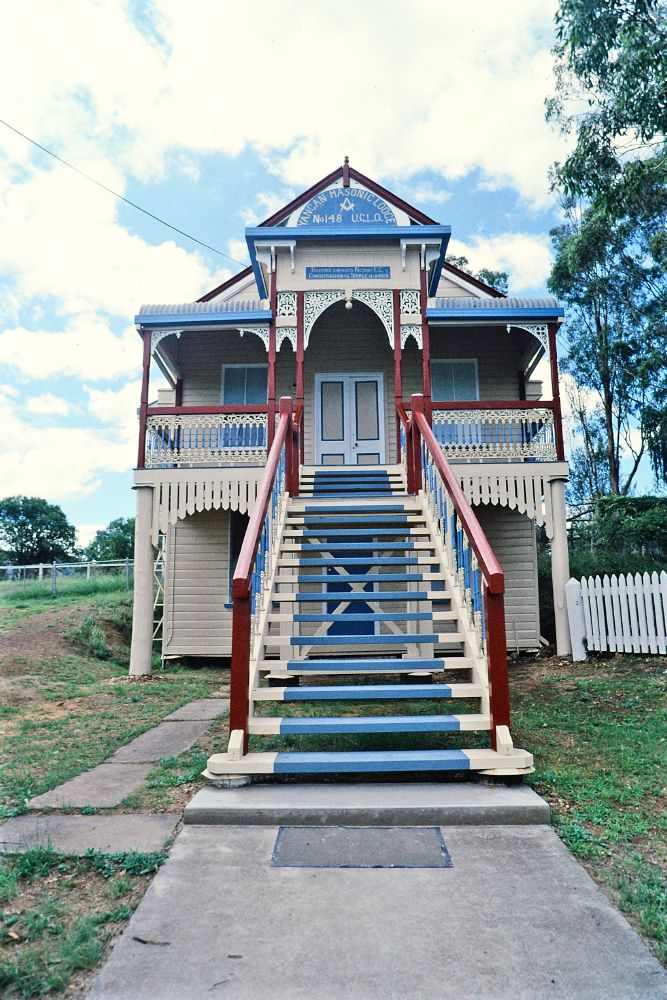
- Yangan Masonic Hall

- Location within Queensland Location within Australia
- 28.1961°S 152.2112°E
- Location: 36 King Street, Yangan, Southern Downs Region, Queensland, Australia

History
- Design period: 1870s–1890s (late 19th century)
- Built: 1898–1957

Site notes
- Architectural styles: Federation Filigree, Queenslander

Queensland Heritage Register
- Official name: Yangan Masonic Hall, Yangan Masonic Temple, Yangan School of Arts
- Type: state heritage (built)
- Designated: 21 October 1992
- Reference no.: 600526
- Significant period: 1898, 1901, 1957 (fabric); 1898–1912 (historical); 1898–ongoing (social)
- Significant components: steps/stairway, furniture/fittings, wall/s – retaining, toilet block/earth closet/water closet

Yangan Masonic Hall is a heritage-listed masonic hall at 36 King Street, Yangan, Southern Downs Region, Queensland, Australia. It was built from 1898 to 1957. It is also known as Yangan Masonic Temple and was formerly the Yangan School of Arts (not to be confused with present Yangan School of Arts). It was added to the Queensland Heritage Register on 21 October 1992.

== History ==
The Yangan Masonic Hall was acquired by the Yangan Lodge as their meeting place in 1912. Erected c.1898 it was built as Yangan's first School of Arts when the town was developing as one of the Darling Downs' small but prosperous towns.

The Yangan and Swanfels area (then named Loganvale) was explored by Allan Cunningham in 1827. In 1840 the Leslie brothers established Canning Downs, one of the station outposts being Heifer Creek whose first hut and stockyard were established at what became Yangan. The town developed to serve the industries of the Swanfels Valley: timber getting, sandstone quarrying, dairying, and mixed farming. Although a settlement (including a school, church, and police station) existed prior to 1884, it was the opening of the first stage of the Warwick to Killarney railway line (including a station at Yangan) on 2 June of that year which provided the real impetus for further development. The Warwick to Killarney line was one of the earliest of the state's branch lines built to service short-distance traffic generated by farmers rather than squatters.

By 1900, Yangan had become "one of the most thriving centres on the [Warwick-to-Killarney] line." According to an article in the Queenslander, "Here there are two cheese factories which have done an inestimable amount of good for the whole district. The township which is growing larger every year, has several stores, a couple of black-smith shops, a hall, ... and two boarding-houses. There was also a very natty little School of Arts and reading room."

The Yangan School of Arts was formed in 1897. By the following year a single storeyed timber building had been erected according to plans and specifications prepared by MP Henricksen on a small 19 perch block owned by the Warwick Hospital Committee. As early as 1899, plans were afoot to enlarge the building to twice its existing size. In 1901 this work was undertaken by which time the institution included a library room and smoke room. The work costing £49.13.6 (including additions and the removal of the existing building further back on the site) was undertaken by contractor WP McDonald according to plans prepared by School of Arts caretaker C Berthelsen.

By 1909, further expansion including a billiard room was planned. The existing site was not apparently considered suitable for this and a new site was sought. For a time removal of the building to a new site was contemplated, however in June 1912 tenders were called for the erection of a new School of Arts building (without billiard room) on a site on the southern side of King Street purchased from the Railways Department. The new School of Arts building (Yangan School of Arts) was opened on 19 October 1912.

In the same year the Yangan Masonic Lodge acquired the first School of Arts building for some £40 (from the School of Arts) and the site for some £25 (from the Warwick Hospital Committee). An overdraft of £130 was arranged to meet the cost of purchase and improvements undertaken immediately with several of the Brethren giving freely of their labour for some weeks. The temple which became known as the Temple with the Long Stairs was officially dedicated on 11 September 1912.

The Yangan Lodge was formed in 1903 as no. 3082 under the English Constitution. Prior to its formation locals were members of other lodges such as St George's, Cunningham, and Killarney; early meetings were held at the Yangan Oddfellows Hall (now the Yangan Hall).

The first Queensland Masonic Lodge, known as the North Australian Lodge was established in Brisbane in 1859. As lodges were established in other Queensland towns, the type of Masonic Temple erected varied considerably; however the plan of the Lodge Room remains constant reflecting the highly symbolic and ritualised practices of the Masons.

In 1920 the Yangan Lodge became no. 107 of the Queensland Grand Lodge which was temporarily formed to enable lodges like Yangan which had worked under the English, Scottish, and Irish Constitutions to unite with the Grand Lodge of Queensland to form the United Grand Lodge of Queensland. With the union of the two Grand Lodges on 29 April 1921 Yangan became no. 148 on the roll of the United Grand Lodge of Queensland.

After the first World War, the Lodge began to expand again; one of the events of the district was the annual Yangan Masonic Ball. A number of improvements were made to the Lodge Room at this time including the purchase of the altar, organ, tracing boards, and various other furnishings. Battery powered electric light was installed c.1930 to replace kerosene lanterns and candles.

During World War II the activities of the lodge were severely curtailed: blackout conditions were enforced, installation banquets and formal dress for meetings were abandoned, and nearly all Offices were held by Past Masters.

Post-war alterations included modifications to enable the removal of part of the wall between the Lodge Room and ante-room (1950s); and during the 1970s work included the remodelling of the Festive Board Room, alterations to provide a second external stairway, and the addition of a door from the Lodge Room directly to the outside in the event of fire. In 1994 repairs (including the reconstruction of the front stair and repainting) were undertaken.

Perhaps the most significant change to the site involved the building in 1957 of a concrete retaining wall, stairs, and pillars with lights at the street entry adding even more weight to Yangan's unofficial title, the Temple with the Long Stairs. This effect was even further accentuated by council works undertaken about this time to King Street which saw the street become in effect split into three levels, with the Yangan Masonic Temple in a commanding position on the highest level of all.

The post World War II period saw a decline in Yangan's fortunes epitomised by the closure of the Warwick to Killarney railway on 1 May 1964. By the late 1970s the Yangan Masonic Lodge was struggling to exist with rising costs, few candidates, and low attendances. Within a decade however it had overcome many of those difficulties to become once again a thriving lodge.

== Description ==
The village of Yangan lies in the Swanfels Valley some 18 kilometres (11 mi) to the east of Warwick, on the banks of Swan Creek. The Masonic Hall is a two-storeyed timber building on the northern side of King Street, the main street of Yangan. It sits on the high side of this street, on the south-western bank of Carey's Hill giving it commanding views over the valley. The site falls from the rear towards the street boundary where the entry to the site is formalised by a concrete retaining wall with concrete stairs, pillars with lights and fence posts with chain- wire panels between. Vehicular access to the site is from a secondary road running along the high side of King Street. To the rear of the site is a timber and corrugated iron outdoor toilet.

The building has two levels, including a long entry stair, on the low or south side of the site, with the ground then rising to just below the floor of the upper level at the rear. The southern or street elevation has a symmetrical verandah with a central gabled entry porch, and bull-nosed verandah roofs to either side. The name of the building is painted within the porch gable, and below is painted details of the foundation and consecration. Over the remainder of the building is a corrugated iron gable-ended roof with two roof vents. Above the entry is a cast iron lace archway, and to either side are lace spandrels between paired chamfered timber posts. To the corners are cast iron lace brackets, although some are missing and one has been replaced by a bracket from a window hood. Approach to the building is by the long timber stair. The verandah and stair have cast iron lace balustrade panels, with a timber handrail.

Externally, the building is clad in chamferboards. The windows are timber sash, or aluminium-framed glass louvres. All of the window hoods and the roof to the side entry are of metal deck. The entry doors are panelled French doors. There are two other external doors to the western side of the upper level, and one to the street elevation for the lower level.

Internally, the upper level is divided into the Lodge Room and the Ante-Room. The Ante-Room has a small storage area to one corner. Between the Ante-Room and the Lodge Room, the timber wall has been modified to include removable boarded panels which allows the seating to extend into the Ante-Room when required. The interior is painted light blue with brown trims, and to the Lodge Room a brown dado with stencilled frieze.

The interior walls are lined with wide beaded vertical boarding. The ceilings are of tongue and groove board, with a fretted ceiling rose to the Ante-Room. The ceiling to the Lodge Room is raked to the line of the collar-tie with moulded timber cornices at both junctions. The floor is also timber boards, with raised platforms to the perimeter for the seating. The furniture in the Lodge Room includes timber "thrones" denoting rank of office with desks, timber pews, lectern, bible pedestal, black and white linoleum floor centrepiece, triangular timber encased "G" suspended from the ceiling, and wall mounted tracing boards. Also mounted on the walls are various ceremonial items including sword-bayonets and gavels. The panelled entry door to the Lodge Room has brass knockers to both sides and a sliding eye- hole.

On the lower level is a small kitchen and dining area known as the Festive Board Room. Its walls are lined with fibrous cement sheet. In its centre is a chamfered timber post.

== Heritage listing ==
Yangan Masonic Hall was listed on the Queensland Heritage Register on 21 October 1992 having satisfied the following criteria.

The place is important in demonstrating the evolution or pattern of Queensland's history.

Situated on the high northern side of Yangan's main street, the Yangan Masonic Hall with its long processional approach (giving rise to its title as the Temple with the Long Stairs) is a distinctive landmark and symbol of the former prosperity of the town in which only remnants of the main streetscape survive. Erected as the first reading room and library of the Yangan School of Arts and later acquired and altered by the Yangan Masonic Lodge, the Hall has a commanding view of the district which it has served for nearly a century.

The place is important in demonstrating the principal characteristics of a particular class of cultural places.

The Masonic Hall is in essence a simple timber vernacular public building, but its decorative frontal emphasis of the gabled entry porch, verandah clad in filigree screen, long timber stair, and ceremonial approach is (in common with the present School of Arts building (Yangan School of Arts)) a deliberate gesture to demonstrate the civic prominence of the building, and to formally address the town's main street.

The place is important because of its aesthetic significance.

Situated on the high northern side of Yangan's main street, the Yangan Masonic Hall with its long processional approach (giving rise to its title as the Temple with the Long Stairs) is a distinctive landmark and symbol of the former prosperity of the town in which only remnants of the main streetscape survive.

The place has a strong or special association with a particular community or cultural group for social, cultural or spiritual reasons.

As the meeting place of the Yangan Masonic Lodge for over eighty years the Hall (and in particular the Lodge Room and its furnishings) is an integral part of the Masonic ceremonial tradition as practised by several generations of local Masons.
