= Yangan School of Arts =

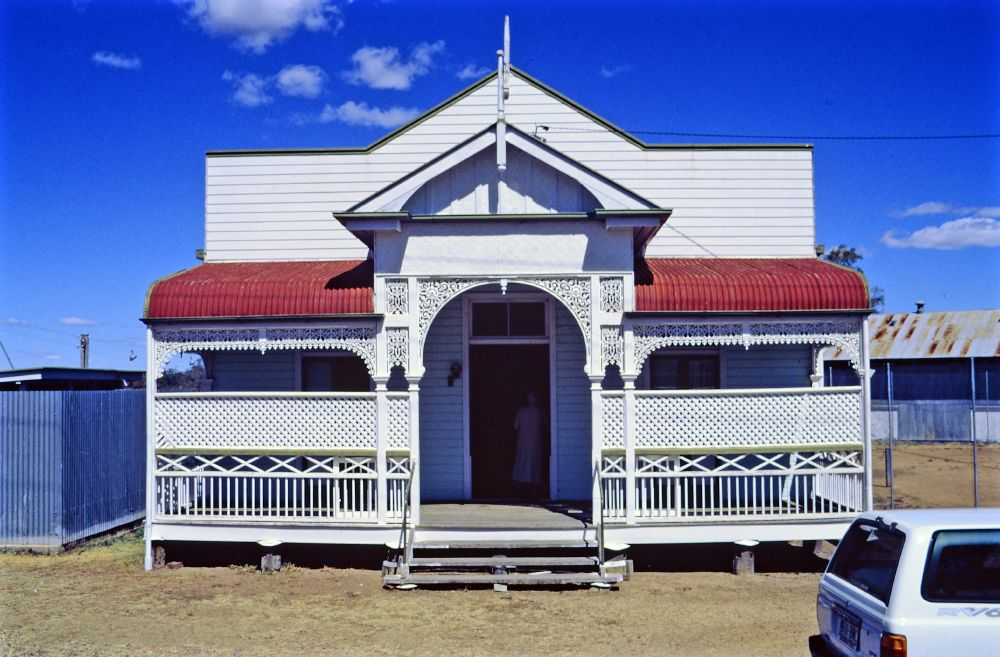
- Yangan School of Arts, 1995

- Location within Queensland Location within Australia
- 28.1965°S 152.2093°E
- Location: 7–9 King Street, Yangan, Southern Downs Region, Queensland, Australia

History
- Design period: 1900–1914 (early 20th century)
- Built: 1912

Queensland Heritage Register
- Official name: Yangan School of Arts
- Type: state heritage (built)
- Designated: 21 October 1992
- Reference no.: 600527
- Significant period: 1910s (fabric); 1912 ongoing (social); 1910s–1940s (historical)
- Significant components: memorial – honour board/ roll of honour, school of arts, library – collection

Yangan School of Arts is a heritage-listed school of arts at 7–9 King Street, Yangan, Southern Downs Region, Queensland, Australia. It was built in 1912. It was added to the Queensland Heritage Register on 21 October 1992.

== History ==
Formed in 1897, the Yangan School of Arts erected their second building in 1912 on land acquired from the Railways Department on the southern side of King Street, Yangan. At that time Yangan was one of a number of small but prosperous Darling Downs towns.

The Yangan and Swanfels area (then named Loganvale) was explored by Allan Cunningham in 1827. In 1840 the Leslie brothers established Canning Downs, one of the station outposts being Heifer Creek whose first hut and stockyard were established at what became Yangan. The town developed to serve the surrounding industries of the Swanfels Valley: timber getting, sandstone quarrying, dairying, and mixed farming. Although a settlement (including a school, church, and police station) existed prior to 1884, it was the opening of the first stage of the Warwick to Killarney railway (including a station at Yangan) on 2 June of that year which provided the real impetus for further development. The Warwick to Killarney line was one of the earliest of the state's branch lines built to service short-distance traffic generated by farmers rather than squatters.

By 1900, Yangan had become one of the most thriving centres on the Warwick-to-Killarney line. At Yangan, there are two cheese factories which have done an inestimable amount of good for the whole district. The township which is growing larger every year, has several stores, a couple of black-smith shops, a hall, two boarding-houses, and a reading room.

The first School of Arts in Queensland was established in Brisbane in 1849. The Schools of Arts grew out of the mechanics' institutes first established in Great Britain in the early 19th century as part of the popular education movement to train working men for Britain's industrial expansion. In Australia, Schools of Arts (aka mechanics' institutes in other states) were often the only cultural and educational facility in newly established towns providing meeting rooms, halls, libraries, and technical education. Later as government assumed some of these responsibilities, the focus of the Schools of Arts became more recreational.

In Yangan, the School of Arts provided to subscribers a lending library and reading room (stocked with current journals and newspapers); its rooms were regularly rented to other local organisations. The School also provided a social focus for the district with (fundraising) entertainments regularly organised by the committee.

The first Yangan School of Arts building (erected c. 1898) was located on the northern (high) side of King Street. In 1912 it was acquired by the local Masonic Lodge becoming the Yangan Masonic Hall. As early as 1899, plans were afoot to enlarge the single storeyed building to twice its existing size. In 1901 this work was undertaken by which time the School of Arts included a library room and smoke room. Further expansion including a billiard room was soon planned. In 1909 the committee approached the Railway Department with regard to providing a new site for the School of Arts. At this time it was apparently envisaged that the existing building would be removed.

However, in June 1912, tenders were called for a new School of Arts building. The site chosen formed part of some 8 acres of Yangan land acquired by the Commissioner for Railways in 1884 to enable the building of the railway line from Warwick to Killarney. Resub 1 of sub 1 of portion 205 containing 18.5 perches (now lot 1) was acquired by Trustees, Redmond Brewer, Alexander Kemp jnr, and Thomas Kirkland on behalf of the School of Arts in September 1911. The adjoining resub 2 (now lot 2) was acquired by the School of Arts in December 1914.

The plans prepared for the new School of Arts by W Kemp to the specification of the School of Arts Committee provided for a three roomed (reading room, library, and committee room) single skinned timber building with latticed verandah set flush with the foot-path. The tender of Sam Fagg for the sum of £264 was accepted.

Hitching posts were erected outside the building and "SCHOOL OF ARTS" was painted on the front of the building which was opened on 19 October 1912 by the Minister for Railways on the occasion of a visit by a Parliamentary party to the district. A short article in the Warwick Argus described the School of Arts as "a well-found little institution of high public utility ... on Saturday night 80 books issued from the library."

In April 1919, a World War I roll of honour was unveiled and a further roll of honour to World War II in 1949. During the post war period many such institutions were in decline. At the Annual General Meeting of the Yangan School of Arts in 1946 it was noted that support by the public was lacking but still, although the war had hampered the institution and owing to radio and pictures having their effect, [they were] still able to carry on. In 1947, a general meeting was held to consider the future of the institution.

Nearly fifty years later, despite the decline of the town's fortunes epitomised by the closure of the Warwick to Killarney railway on 1 May 1964, the Yangan School of Arts, unlike many of its sister institutions, lives on. Although with the recent introduction of a council mobile library service, the future of the School of Arts library is uncertain, the Yangan School of Arts remains a valuable local institution overseen by its Secretary of 43 years, Gus Mauch with its facilities used by more than a dozen local groups including the local play group, Ladies Guild, Queensland Country Women's Association, Queensland Dairymen's Organisation, National Party, Returned and Services League, Graingrowers, Bush Firebrigade, and Sports Association.

== Description ==
The village of Yangan lies in the Swanfels Valley some 18 kilometres (11 mi) to the east of Warwick, on the banks of Swan Creek. The School of Arts is a single-storeyed timber building situated on the southern side of King Street, the main street of Yangan. It sits on a flat, grassy site facing the few remaining shops on the northern side of the street. There is a gravel driveway leading from a secondary road which runs along the low side of King Street. Also on the site is a timber and corrugated iron toilet block to the east, and a tennis shed clad in fibrous cement to the south, neither of which are of cultural heritage significance. To the west and south of the site are clay tennis courts, and to the east is the Police Station and lock-up. Further to the south is the corrugated iron structure of the former Grain Shed, built about 1922.

The building is a simple, timber-framed structure on low timber stumps, with a hipped corrugated iron roof. The street or northern facade has a symmetrical verandah with a central gabled entry porch, and bull-nosed verandah roofs to either side. A timber parapet divides this from the roof over the main body of the building. There is a frieze of flat pressed metal panels to the entry porch, and to the ends of the bull nosed roofs. The porch ceiling is of tongue and groove boards, the remainder being unlined. The verandah has a dowelled and cross-braced timber balustrade with diagonal lattice panels above. There is a pair of dowelled gates to the entry. The original gates were taller and remnants of these still exist stored under the building. The verandah also has chamfered timber posts with timber capitals, and a cast iron lace frieze with brackets. The lacework is continued as spandrels between the paired timber posts, and as an archway over the entry. Leading onto the verandah are three pairs of French doors with tilting fanlights. The central entry doors are panelled, whilst the doors to either side are glazed. The cladding to this northern facade is chamferboard, but on the other three faces and the parapet this has been replaced by fibrous cement planks.

The rectangular plan is divided into the Reading Room, the Library and the Kitchen (formerly the committee room). The Reading Room is accessed from the verandah by two of the French doors, the Library from the third, and the Kitchen from a later ledged and partly braced door on the eastern side. The three windows to the Reading Room are aluminium sliders, and the windows to the Library and Kitchen are timber sashes. All of the windows have ripple iron hoods with cast iron lace brackets. The two internal doors are panelled, also with tilting fanlights.

The internal wall lining to the Reading Room and Library is vertical tongue and groove boarding, apart from the eastern wall of the Library where it has been removed. The walls to the Reading Room have a timber picture rail. The Kitchen walls are lined with fibrous cement sheet. All of the ceilings are also tongue and groove boards, with two pressed zinc ceiling roses to the Reading Room, and one each to the Library and Kitchen.

Mounted on the walls of the Reading Room are two war memorial honour boards. A matching pair made from silky oak and marble, the one on the eastern wall being for World War I, and the one on the western wall being for World War II and Vietnam. Also in the Reading Room are two timber reading tables reputedly dating from the opening of the building. The Library still houses a substantial collection of books.

== Heritage listing ==
Yangan School of Arts was listed on the Queensland Heritage Register on 21 October 1992 having satisfied the following criteria.

The place is important in demonstrating the evolution or pattern of Queensland's history.

In Queensland the Schools of Arts were the forerunners of the government operated public libraries, technical colleges, and cultural centres.

Formed in the late nineteenth century when the town was developing the infrastructure to support a thriving district, the Yangan School of Arts and its (second) building erected in Yangan's main street in 1912 are important reminders of those more prosperous times; the change reflected in the much reduced streetscape of King Street of which the School of Arts building and the Yangan Masonic Hall are an important part.

The place demonstrates rare, uncommon or endangered aspects of Queensland's cultural heritage.

Unlike many of its sister institutions in the state, both the building (which houses the district's war memorials) and the institution survive.

The place is important in demonstrating the principal characteristics of a particular class of cultural places.

Somewhat atypical for an institution of this size, is the centrality of the Reading Room and Library (whose book collection survives) to the institution's functions.

The place is important because of its aesthetic significance.

The School of Arts is in essence a simple timber vernacular public building, but its decorative frontal emphasis of the gabled entry porch and verandah clad in filigree screen is a deliberate gesture to demonstrate the civic prominence of the building, and to formally address the town's main street.

The place has a strong or special association with a particular community or cultural group for social, cultural or spiritual reasons.

The Yangan School of Arts has for nearly a century fulfilled an important cultural, educational, and social role for the town and its district.
