= Maryvale railway line =

Former railway line in Queensland, Australia

The Maryvale railway line was a branch railway in the Southern Downs region of Queensland, Australia.

Maryvale Estate to the north east of Warwick was purchased by the government and subdivided into farms. A branch line to service the region was approved in 1908. Opened on 30 September 1911, the line branched from the Southern main line at Killarney Junction (now named Mill Hill) and stretched about 30 kilometres to Maryvale via Womina, Sladevale, Campbell's Plains, Freestone, Clintonvale and Gladfield.

The line was intended to be part of a via recta (Latin, "straight route") from Brisbane to Sydney. Prior to the completion of the New South Wales Government Railways North Coast Line in 1932, the only rail link from Brisbane to Sydney was via the break-of-gauge at Wallangarra on the state border, where the two states' railway systems met. The route from Brisbane to Wallangarra went west from Brisbane to Toowoomba then south to Wallangarra. The via recta was a putative short-cut south-west from Ipswich to Warwick, which would have shortened the distance from Brisbane to Sydney by between 92 km and 95 km.

The via recta would have consisted of the Maryvale branch from Warwick, the Mount Edwards branch from Ipswich, through Spicers Gap (just south of Cunninghams Gap) through the Great Dividing Range. The Warwick Argus reported that the citizens of Toowoomba were unhappy at the prospect of the via recta being built, as interstate traffic would bypass their town.

Trial surveys for the via recta line began as early as 1880, and the first sod on the Maryvale line was turned on 18 March 1910 by Premier of Queensland William Kidston. However, once the standard gauge line from NSW was extended north to South Brisbane in 1930, the rationale for the via recta disappeared and the project was abandoned.

A daily mixed train began on the line and was later reduced to a thrice-weekly service. A rail motor service began in 1930 and linked with the Sydney Mail at Warwick. A 1932 timetable showed five rail motors and one mixed train per week running in each direction on the Maryvale line, with extra goods services during the wheat season.

The line closed on 1 November 1960 after the Cunningham Highway was upgraded through Cunninghams Gap due to the increasing popularity of road transport, thus ending all hope of the via recta line being built.

== See also ==
- Rail transport in Queensland
