= EARC =

EARC may refer to:

- East African Railways and Harbours Corporation, previously East African Railways Corporation and abbreviated "EARC"
- Eastern Association of Rowing Colleges
- Electoral and Administrative Review Commission, a former government agency in Queensland, Australia
- Electronic Advance Reader Copy, an electronic format book for pre-publishing readers to review
- Enhanced Audio Return Channel (eARC), part of the HDMI specification
