= Upper Freestone, Queensland =

Upper Freestone
- Suburb
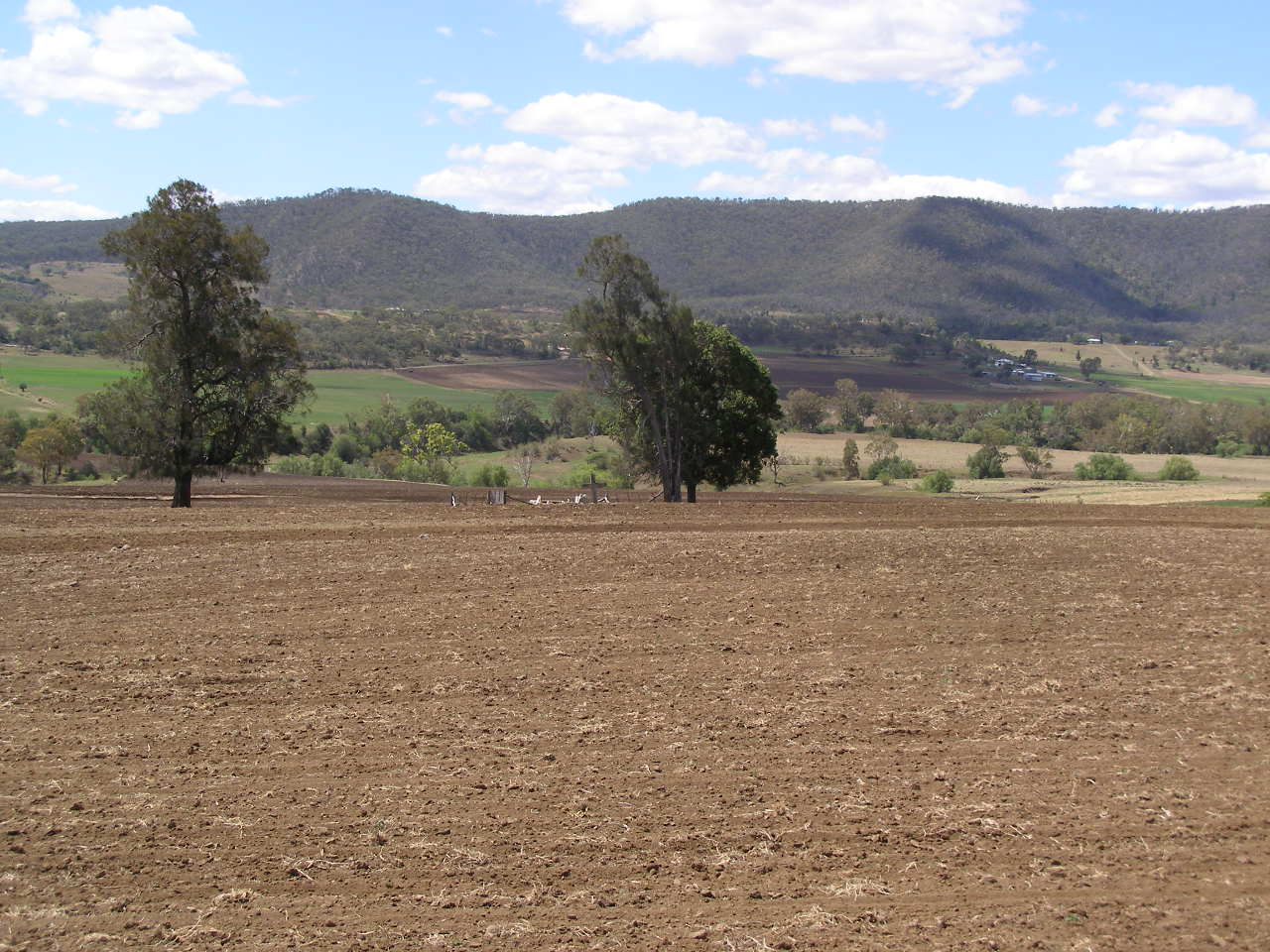
- Upper Freestone landscape, 2007

- Interactive map of Upper Freestone
- Coordinates: 28.1233°S 152.2205°E
- Country: Australia
- State: Queensland
- LGA: Southern Downs Region
- Location: 21.3 km (13.2 mi) NW of Warwick; 90.2 km (56.0 mi) SSE of Toowoomba; 112 km (70 mi) SW of Ipswich; 151 km (94 mi) SW of Brisbane

Government
  - State electorate: Southern Downs
  - Federal division: Maranoa

Area
  - Total: 42.3 km^{2} (16.3 sq mi)

Population
  - Total: 75 (2021 census)
  - Density: 1.773/km^{2} (4.59/sq mi)
- Time zone: UTC+10:00 (AEST)
- Postcode: 4370
Suburbs around Upper Freestone
Freestone	Gladfield	Maryvale
Freestone	Upper Freestone	Swanfels
Mount Sturt	Swanfels	Swanfels

Upper Freestone is a rural locality in the Southern Downs Region, Queensland, Australia. In the 2021 census, Upper Freestone had a population of 75 people.

== Geography ==
Mount Dumaresq Conservation Park has two non-contiguous sections. The larger of the two is in the north of the locality (28.0903°S 152.2103°E) extending further north into Gladfield.

Freestone Creek (which rises on the western side of the Great Dividing Range) enters the locality from the east on the boundary between Maryvale and Swanfels and flows through the locality exiting to the west (Freestone). It is part of the Murray-Darling drainage basin.

== History ==
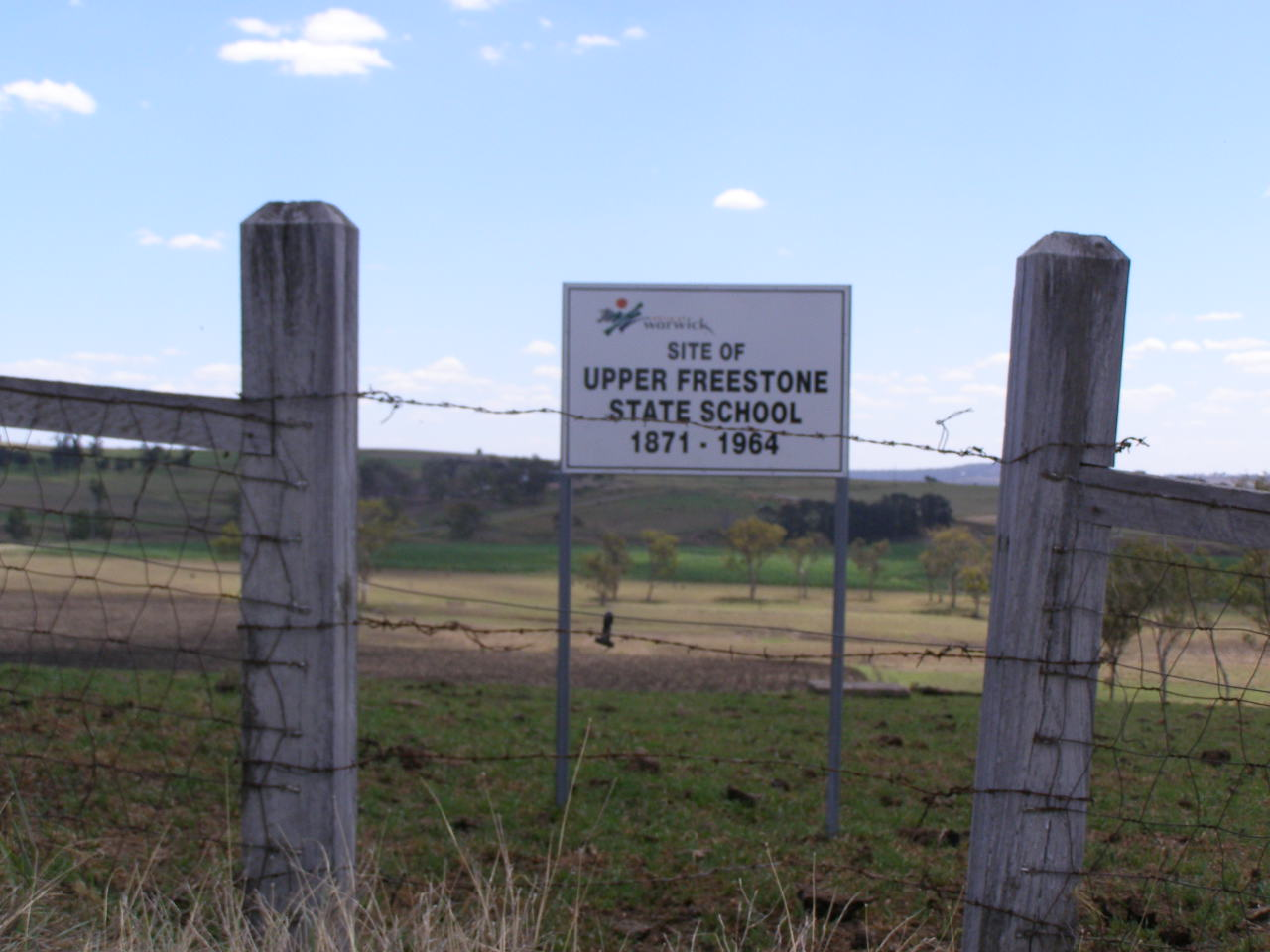
Upper Freestone State School site, 2007

Freestone Creek (No 2) Provisional School opened on 19 October 1874. It was renamed Freestone Creek Upper Provisional School circa 1879. In 1885 it became Freestone Creek Upper State School. In 1940 it was renamed Freestone Upper State School. It closed in 1964. The school was on Upper Freestone School Road (28.1369°S 152.1919°E).

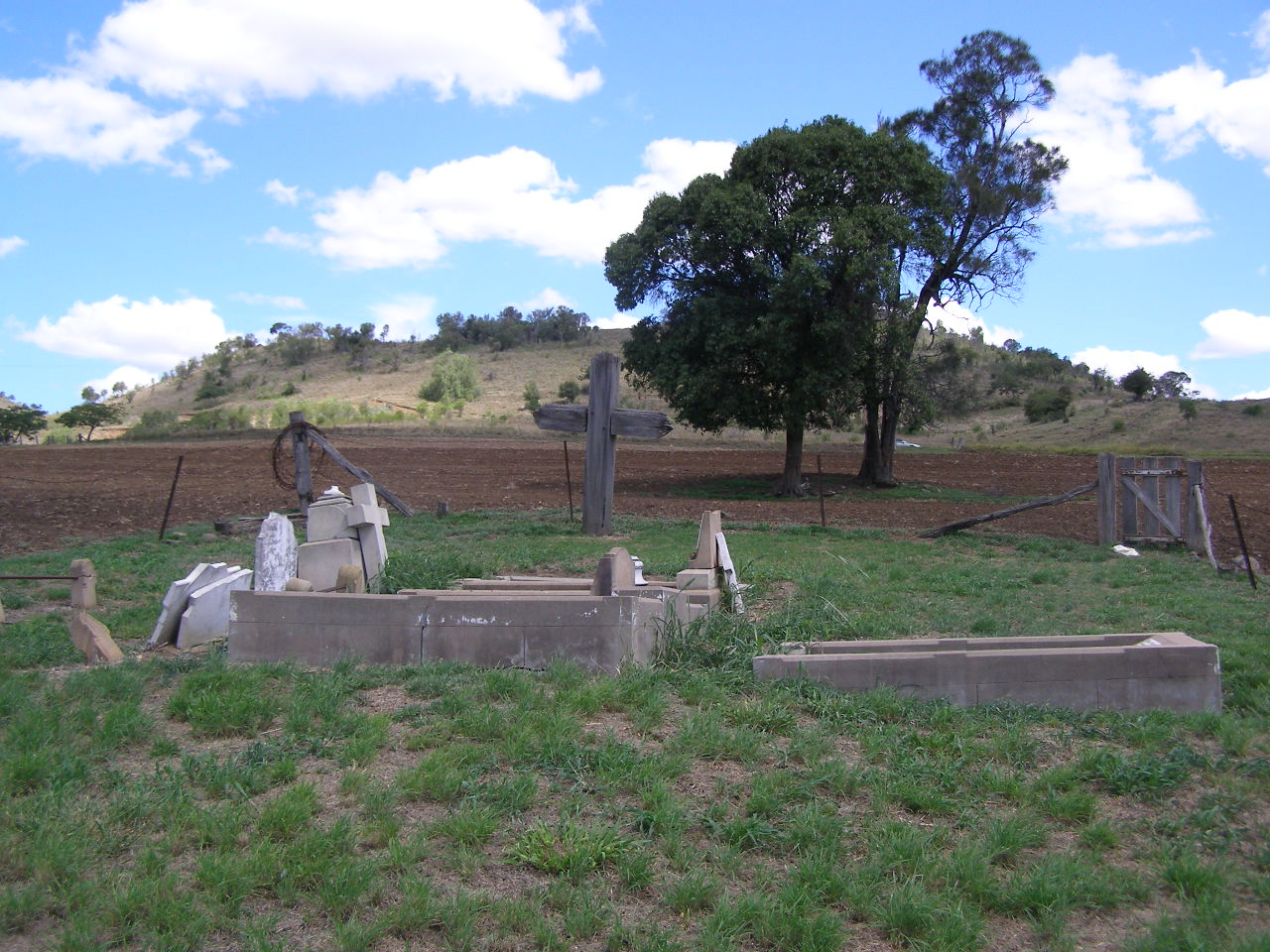
Upper Freestone cemetery, 2007

In 1883, 10-acre (4.0 ha) of land was reserved for the Upper Freestone cemetery. A cemetery trust was established in 1896. The cemetery closed in 1971. The only surviving part of the cemetery are a group of graves of the O'Dempsey family which have been maintained by the family. The cemetery is a field to the north of McMaster Road (28.1360°S 152.1984°E).

== Demographics ==
In the 2016 census, Upper Freestone had a population of 90 people.

In the 2021 census, Upper Freestone had a population of 75 people.

== Education ==
There are no schools in Upper Freestone. The nearest government primary schools are Freestone State School in neighbouring Freestone to the west and Yangan State School in Yangan to the south. The nearest government secondary school is Warwick State High School in Warwick to the south-west.
