= Shire of Allora =

Coordinates: 28°02′09.76″S 151°59′06.31″E

Shire of Allora Queensland
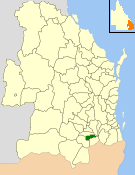
- Location within Queensland
- Population: 2,234 (1991 census)
  - Density: 3.2162/km^{2} (8.3300/sq mi)
- Established: 1869
- Area: 694.6 km^{2} (268.2 sq mi)
- Council seat: Allora
- Region: Darling Downs
LGAs around Shire of Allora:
Clifton	Clifton	Gatton
Rosenthal	Shire of Allora	Boonah
Rosenthal	Glengallan	Glengallan

The Shire of Allora was a local government area north of the regional centre of Warwick in the Darling Downs region of Queensland. The shire, administered from Allora, covered an area of 702.0 square kilometres (271.0 sq mi), and existed as a local government entity from 1869 until 1994, when it was dissolved and amalgamated with City of Warwick, Shire of Rosenthal and Shire of Glengallan to form the Shire of Warwick.

== History ==
The Borough of Allora came into being on 21 July 1869 under the Municipal Institutions Act 1864. The surrounding region was incorporated on 11 November 1879 as the Clifton Division under the Divisional Boards Act 1879. With the passage of the Local Authorities Act 1902, the Municipality of Allora became the Town of Allora and Clifton Division became Shire of Clifton on 31 March 1903. On 23 January 1915, the Town of Allora was abolished and merged with the southern part of the Shire of Clifton to create the Shire of Allora. The Shire's offices were located at 78 Herbert Street, Allora.

On 19 March 1992, the Electoral and Administrative Review Commission, created two years earlier, produced its report External Boundaries of Local Authorities, and recommended that local government boundaries in the Warwick area be rationalised into 3 new local government areas. That recommendation was not implemented, but the outcome was that the Shire of Allora was merged with the Shires of Glengallan and Rosenthal and the City of Warwick to form a new Shire of Warwick. The Local Government (Allora, Glengallan, Rosenthal and Warwick) Regulation 1994 was gazetted on 20 May 1994. On 25 June, an election was held for the new council, and on 1 July 1994, the Shire of Allora was abolished.

== Towns and localities ==
The Shire of Allora included the following settlements:

- Allora
- Berat
- Clintonvale
- Deuchar
- Ellinthorp
- Goomburra
- Hendon
- Mount Marshall
- Talgai
- Willowvale

== Chairmen and Mayors ==
=== Chairmen of Shire of Allora ===
- 1927: Thomas Muir

=== Mayors of Town of Allora ===
- 1906: W. Deacon

== Population ==
Year	Population
1933	2,624
1947	2,217
1954	2,106
1961	1,961
1966	1,890
1971	1,719
1976	1,666
1981	1,679
1986	2,041
1991	2,132
1996	2,234
