= City of Warwick =

Coordinates: 28°12′59.98″S 152°01′00.01″E

- Local government area
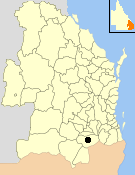
- Location within Queensland
- Country: Australia
- State: Queensland
- Region: Darling Downs
- Established: 1861
- Council seat: Warwick

Area
  - Total: 25.1 km^{2} (9.7 sq mi)

Population
  - Total: 10,393 (1991 census)
  - Density: 414.1/km^{2} (1,072.4/sq mi)
LGAs around City of Warwick
Allora	Allora	Glengallan
Rosenthal	City of Warwick	Glengallan
Rosenthal	Glengallan	Glengallan

The City of Warwick was a local government area administering the regional centre of Warwick in the Darling Downs region of Queensland. The City covered an area of 25.1 square kilometres (9.7 sq mi), and existed as a local government entity from 1861 until 1994, when it was dissolved and amalgamated with Shire of Allora, Shire of Rosenthal and Shire of Glengallan to form the Shire of Warwick.

== History ==
The Borough of Warwick came into being on 25 May 1861 under the Municipalities Act 1858, a piece of New South Wales legislation inherited by Queensland at its separation two years earlier.

With the passage of the Local Authorities Act 1902, the Borough of Warwick became the Town of Warwick.

On 4 April 1936 it was proclaimed as the City of Warwick.

On 19 March 1992, the Electoral and Administrative Review Commission, created two years earlier, produced its report External Boundaries of Local Authorities, and recommended that local government boundaries in the Warwick area be rationalised into 3 new local government areas. That recommendation was not implemented, but the outcome was that the City of Warwick was merged with the Shires of Allora, Glengallan and Rosenthal to form a new Shire of Warwick. The Local Government (Allora, Glengallan, Rosenthal and Warwick) Regulation 1994 was gazetted on 20 May 1994. On 25 June, an election was held for the new council, and on 1 July 1994, the City of Warwick was abolished.

== Mayors ==
- 1861–1862: James Jones Kingsford
- 1863: Thomas McEvoy
- 1864: William Marshall
- 1865: S. W. Alfred
- 1866: Thomas McEvoy
- 1866–1867: James Morgan, father of Arthur Morgan (mayor 1886–1889 and Premier of Queensland)
- 1868: John Liddell Ross
- 1869: Edmund L. Thornton
- 1870 John Liddell Ross
- 1871–1872: Samuel Evenden
- 1873–1874: John Liddell Ross
- 1875: Frederick Morgan
- 1876: Frederick Hudson
- 1876–1877: Jacob Horwitz, Member of the Queensland Legislative Assembly for Warwick
- 1878: John W. Quinn
- 1879–1880: James M'Keachie
- 1881–1884: Thomas Alexander Johnson, Member of the Queensland Legislative Council and father of W.G. Johnson (mayor in 1912)
- 1885: W.D. Wilson
- 1886–1889: Arthur Morgan, Member of the Queensland Legislative Assembly for Warwick, Member of the Queensland Legislative Council, Premier of Queensland
- 1890: John Archibald, also Member of the Queensland Legislative Council
- 1891: John Healy, a council member for 33 years and father of John Healy, Member of the Queensland Legislative Assembly for Warwick
- 1892: Francis Grayson, also Member of the Queensland Legislative Assembly for Cunningham
- 1893: William Morgan
- 1894: William Collins
- 1895: Jeremiah Allman, father of John Allman (mayor in 1933)
- 1896: Francis Grayson (2nd term)
- 1897: John Archibald (2nd term)
- 1898: Arthur Morgan (2nd term)
- 1899: William Wallace
- 1900–1901: William Morgan
- 1902: Jeremiah Allman (2nd term)
- 1903: C.B. Daveney
- 1904: Francis Grayson (3rd term)
- 1905: J.D. Connellan
- 1906: J.S. Morgan
- 1907: B.T. De Conlay
- 1908–1909: R.J. Shilliday
- 1910: Daniel Connolly
- 1911: John Healy (2nd term)
- 1912: W.G. Johnson, son of Thomas Alexander Johnson (MLC and mayor in 1881–1884)
- 1913: John Allman
- 1914: John Lamb
- 1915: John Anderson
- 1916: D.J. Hutchings
- 1917–1918: John W. Gilham
- 1919: A.P. Jutsum
- 1920: R.E. Gillam
- 1921–1923: John Anderson
- 1924: Daniel Connolly
- 1927: Daniel Connolly
- 1933–1936: John Allman, son of Jeremiah Allman (mayor in 1895)
- 1988: Stanley Richard Walsh

== Town clerks ==
- 1861: Edward Jones
- 1861: C. F. Bell
- 1861–1863 :John Oxenham
- 1863–1865: George Kennedy
- 1865–1868: J. M. Garrett
- 1868–1903: F. B. Woods
- 1903–1916: J. Spreadborough

== Population ==
Year	Population
1933	6,664
1947	7,129
1954	9,151
1961	9,843
1966	10,065
1971	9,303
1976	9,169
1981	8,853
1986	9,435
1991	10,393
1996	10,947
