= Shire of Rosenthal =

Coordinates: 28°14′32.1″S 152°00′57.43″E

- Local government area
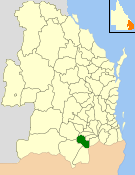
- Location within Queensland
- Country: Australia
- State: Queensland
- Region: Darling Downs
- Established: 1886
- Council seat: Rosenthal Heights

Area
  - Total: 1,974.4 km^{2} (762.3 sq mi)

Population
  - Total: 2,241 (1991 census)
  - Density: 1.13503/km^{2} (2.9397/sq mi)
LGAs around Shire of Rosenthal
Millmerran	Clifton	Allora
Inglewood	Shire of Rosenthal	Glengallan
Inglewood	Stanthorpe	Tenterfield (NSW)

The Shire of Rosenthal was a local government area south and west of the regional centre of Warwick in the Darling Downs region of Queensland. The shire, administered from Rosenthal Heights, a Warwick suburb, covered an area of 1,984.1 square kilometres (766.1 sq mi), and existed as a local government entity from 1886 until 1994, when it was dissolved and amalgamated with City of Warwick, Shire of Allora and Shire of Glengallan to form the Shire of Warwick.

== History ==
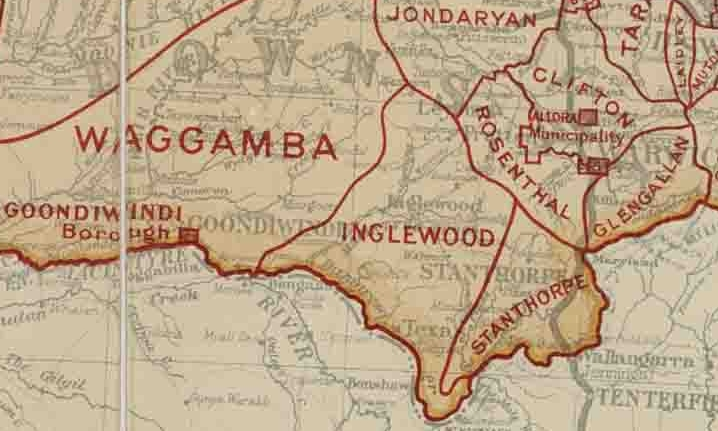
Map of Rosenthal Division and adjacent local government areas, March 1902. Legend: Warwick Municipality (5)

The Inglewood Division was created on 11 November 1879 as one of 74 divisions around Queensland under the Divisional Boards Act 1879 with a population of 1378. Following a petition by residents, the Rosenthal Division was created on 18 April 1889 under the Divisional Boards Act 1879 from Subdivision No. 1 of Inglewood Division.

With the passage of the Local Authorities Act 1902, Rosenthal Division became the Shire of Rosenthal on 31 March 1903. Its offices were located at Willi Street, Rosenthal Heights.

On 19 March 1992, the Electoral and Administrative Review Commission, created two years earlier, produced its report External Boundaries of Local Authorities, and recommended that local government boundaries in the Warwick area be rationalised into 3 new local government areas. That recommendation was not implemented, but the outcome was that the Shire of Rosenthal was merged with the Shires of Allora and Glengallan and the City of Warwick to form a new Shire of Warwick. The Local Government (Allora, Glengallan, Rosenthal and Warwick) Regulation 1994 was gazetted on 20 May 1994. On 25 June, an election was held for the new council, and on 1 July 1994, the Shire of Rosenthal was abolished.

== Towns and localities ==
The Shire of Rosenthal included the following settlements:

- Rosenthal Heights
- Allan
- Cunningham
- Dalveen
- Greymare
- Karara
- Leslie
- Leyburn
- Palgrave
- Pratten
- Rosehill
- Thane
- Wheatvale

== Chairmen ==
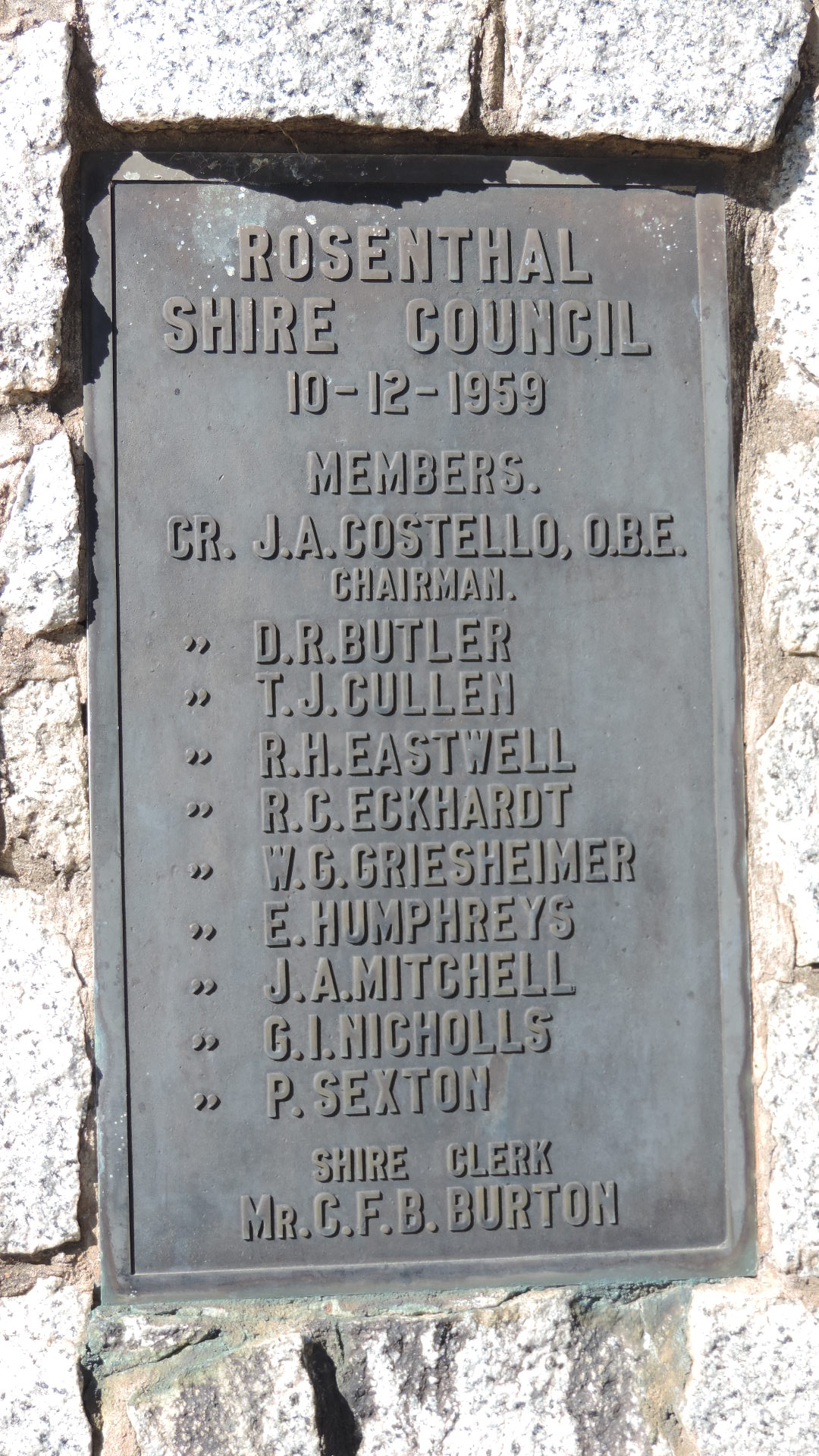
Plaque with list of Rosenthal Shire council members in 1959, back of Patrick Leslie memorial cairn, Cunningham, 2015

- 1927: J. A. Costello
- 1959: J. A. Costello

== Population ==
Year	Population
1933	2,465
1947	1,975
1954	1,631
1961	1,582
1966	1,553
1971	1,494
1976	1,548
1981	1,581
1986	1,963
1991	2,241
1996	2,745
