= Mount Sturt, Queensland =

Mount Sturt
- Suburb
- Interactive map of Mount Sturt
- Coordinates: 28.17°S 152.2077°E
- Country: Australia
- State: Queensland
- LGA: Southern Downs Region
- Location: 23.6 km (14.7 mi) ENE of Warwick; 93.3 km (58.0 mi) S of Toowoomba; 155 km (96 mi) SW of Brisbane

Government
  - State electorate: Southern Downs
  - Federal division: Maranoa

Area
  - Total: 9.3 km^{2} (3.6 sq mi)

Population
  - Total: 0 (2021 census)
  - Density: 0.00/km^{2} (0.00/sq mi)
- Time zone: UTC+10:00 (AEST)
- Postcode: 4370
Suburbs around Mount Sturt
Freestone	Upper Freestone	Swanfels
Freestone	Mount Sturt	Swanfels
Yangan	Yangan	Yangan

Mount Sturt is a rural locality in the Southern Downs Region, Queensland, Australia. In the 2021 census, Mount Sturt had "no people or a very low population".

== Geography ==
Mount Sturt is a mountain in the centre of the locality (28.1682°S 152.1988°E) rising to 894 metres (2,933 ft) above sea level.

The land use is a mixture of grazing on native vegetation and crop growing.

== History ==
The locality takes its name from a railway station, which is named for the mountain, which in turn was named in June 1827 by explorer Allan Cunningham after the explorer Charles Sturt.

The Killarney railway line opened from Warwick to Emu Vale on 2 June 1884 which included the Mount Sturt railway station. The line closed on 1 May 1964. Despite the name, the Mount Sturt railway station was not within the present-day locality of Mount Sturt but with the present-day locality of Yangan.

== Demographics ==
In the 2016 census, Mount Sturt had a population of 18 people.

In the 2021 census, Mount Sturt had "no people or a very low population".

== Education ==
There are no schools in Mount Sturt. The nearest government primary schools are Yangan State School in neighbouring Yangan to the south and Freestone State School in neighbouring Freestone to the north-west. The nearest government secondary school is Warwick State High School in Warwick to the southwest.
