= Electoral and Administrative Review Commission =

The Electoral and Administrative Review Commission (1989–1993) was an agency of the Government of Queensland, Australia to investigate the electoral system and public administration of the state and local government authorities of Queensland.

== History ==
On 3 July 1989, the Commission of Inquiry into Possible Illegal Activities and Associated Police Misconduct (better known as the Fitzgerald Report) recommended the establishment of an Electoral and Administrative Review Commission. The Queensland Government acted on the recommendation by passing the Electoral and Administrative Review Act 1989 to establish the commission, whose purpose was to investigate and report on:

- the Legislative Assembly electoral system
- the operation of the Parliament
- the public administration of the state
- the local authority electoral system
- local authority administration

and to monitor the implementations of any reforms arising.

The commission was fully constituted on 21 March 1990 under the chairman, Tom Sherman. Tom Sherman resigned on 25 February 1992 and Prof Colin Hughes acted in the role of chairman, until David Solomon was formally appointed to the role on 15 June 1992. Having completed its role outlined in the Fitzgerald Report, the commission was wound up on 30 September 1993.

The Fitzgerald Royal Commission is regarded as one of the most successful in Australian history in part because of the work of EARC and the other Commission that helped to implement its recommendations, the Criminal Justice Commission (CJC). "It was the EARC process which took Queensland out of the era..in which politics and public administration were largely unaccountable".

== Methods ==
EARC reviews began with the release of Issues papers to promote debate. These were widely circulated, including to public libraries across the state. This was followed by a period during which the public could make submissions. Public hearings were held. All submissions were published. EARC Reports were considered and reported on by a parliamentary committee (PEARC).

== Reports ==
In its short lifespan EARC produced 23 reports. They were tabled in Parliament and in succeeding years the Table Office rendered them into pdf format, so they can now be downloaded from the Parliament web site. The full list is:

- Guidelines for the Declaration of Registrable Interests of Elected Representatives of the Parliament of Queensland (90/R1, August 1990)
- The Local Authority Electoral System of Queensland (90/R2, September 1990)
- Queensland Joint Electoral Roll Review (90/R3, October 1990)
- Queensland Legislative Assembly Electoral System with Appendixes (90/R4, November 1990)
- Judicial Review of Administrative Decision and Actions (90/R5, December 1990)
- Freedom of Information (90/R6, 2 December 1990)

- Public Assembly Law (91/R1, February 1991)
- The Office of Parliamentary Counsel (91/R2, May 1991)
- Public Sector Auditing in Queensland (91/R3, September 1991)
- Protection of Whistleblowers (91/R4, October 1991)
- Local Authority External Boundaries: Chapters 1–12, Chapters 13–21 and Appendices (91/R5, November 1991)
- Determination of Legislative Assembly Electoral Districts (November 1991) (not part of the numbered series of EARC Reports)
- Information and Resources Needs of Non-Government Members of the Queensland Legislative Assembly (91/R6, December 1991) 91/R6
- Review of Elections Act 1983–1991 and Related Matters: Chapters 1–10; Chapters 11–17 and Appendices (91/R7, December 1991)

- Review of Codes of Conduct for Public Officials (92/R1, May 1992)
- Investigation of Public Registration of Political Donations, Public funding of Election Campaigns and Related Issues (92/R2, June 1992)
- Review of Archives Legislation (92/R3, June 1992)
- Review of Parliamentary Committees: Chapters 1–8, Chapters 9–14 and Appendices (92/R4, October 1992)

- Review of Government Media and Information Services (93/R1, April 1993)
- Independence of the Attorney-General (93/R2, July 1993)
- Appeals from Administrative Decisions: Report plus Appendices 1–25, 26–48 and 49–73 (93/R3, August 1993)
- Consolidation and Review of the Queensland Constitution (93/R4, August 1993)
- The Preservation And Enhancement Of Individuals' Rights And Freedoms (93/R5, August 1993)

== Local Government boundaries ==
The commission's report External Boundaries of Local Authorities tabled on 19 March 1992 made a series of recommendations to adjust the boundaries between various local government authorities, but, more significantly and more controversially, to amalgamate a number of local government authorities. This work was not included in the Fitzgerald Report or the EARC enabling legislation but was added later. Not all of the EARC recommendations were acted upon by the Queensland Government and others were implemented differently. The local authorities recommended for amalgamation and the outcomes of the recommendations where:

- City of Warwick, Shire of Glengallan, Shire of Rosenthal and Shire of Allora (not implemented as recommended, but all four were amalgamated into the new Shire of Warwick)
- Shire of Clifton and Shire of Cambooya (not implemented)
- City of Gympie and Shire of Widgee (amalgamated into the new Shire of Cooloola)
- City of Maryborough and Shire of Woocoo (not implemented)
- City of Bundaberg and Shire of Woongarra (not implemented, but instead Woongarra and Shire of Gooburrum were amalgamated into the new Shire of Burnett)
- City of Townsville and City of Thuringowa(not implemented)
- City of Gladstone and Shire of Calliope (not implemented)
- City of Mackay and Shire of Pioneer (amalgamated into an enlarged City of Mackay)

Although some of the recommendations were not implemented, many were implemented in subsequent reforms of local government boundaries.
