= Killarney railway line =

Former railway line in Queensland

The Killarney railway line was a branch railway in the Darling Downs region of Queensland, Australia. It travelled from Warwick to Killarney and operated from 1884 to 1964.

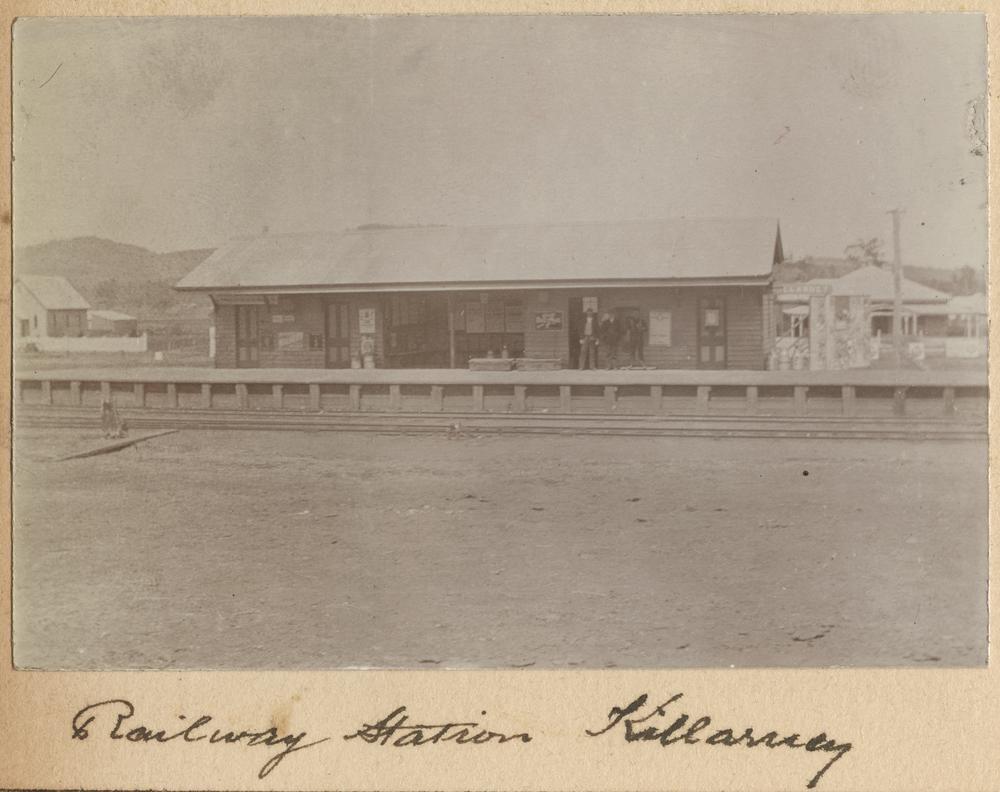
Killarney railway station, c. 1905

Along with approval for the Fassifern and Crows Nest branches in 1880 came parliamentary approval for this branch. Although the owner of the large Canning Downs station offered land to enable a direct route from Warwick to Killarney, a more circuitous route was chosen to serve surrounding farms. It meant that the branch line ran 44 kilometres east from Warwick and then south to Killarney rather than take a direct 32 kilometre route through Canning Downs.

The Southern railway line reached Warwick in 1871. The terminus was then on the northern side of the Condamine River. After construction of a bridge over the river and extension of the line south to Stanthorpe, a stop at East Warwick became Warwick railway station and the old terminus was renamed Mill Hill railway station. The branch line to Killarney left the Southern Line a little beyond Mill Hill at what was called Killarney Junction.

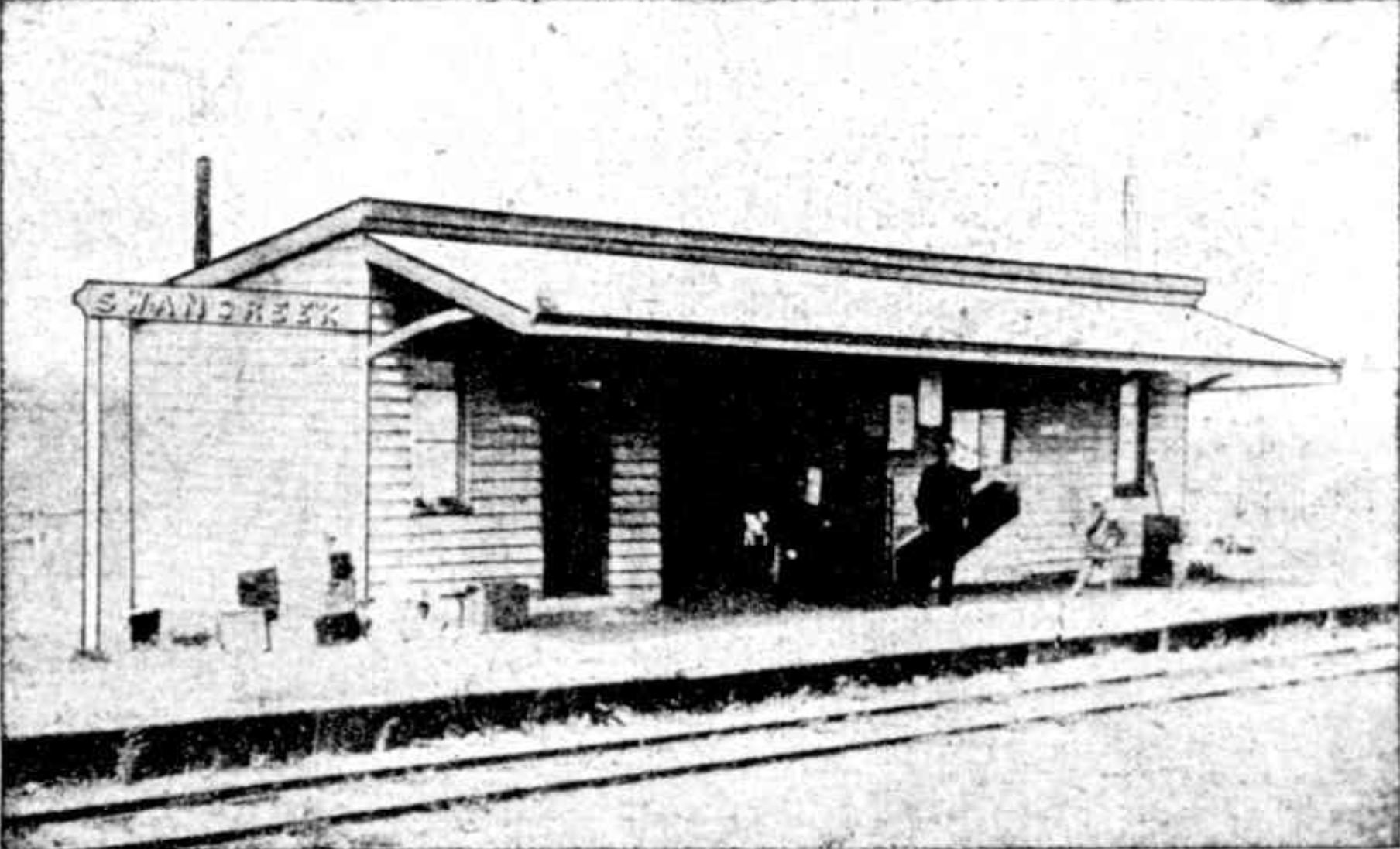
Swan Creek railway station, 1911

The Killarney branch opened as far as Emu Vale on 2 June 1884 and then to Killarney on 24 August 1885. Sidings for the first stage were located at Hermitage, Glencairn, Swan Creek, Karcaruda, Mount Sturt, Yangan and Rockbrae whilst in the second stage Danderoo, Wiyarra, Tannymorel (28.2907°S 152.2474°E) and Grayson (28.3042°S 152.2570°E) were stops.

For the duration of the branch, a train ran six days a week. Grain traffic and cheese from a Yangan factory constituted its major cargo and, after the discovery of coal at Mount Colliery east of Tannymorel, it too contributed greatly to the profitability of the line. From 1930, a railmotor operated the run. The Mount Colliery Tramway, a private 5 km-long horse tramway, opened in 1908. The tramway joined the line at Tannymorel to transport coal from a nearby mine to the railway.

The Killarney line, together with the colliery tramway, closed on 1 May 1964.

== See also ==
- Rail transport in Queensland
- List of tramways in Queensland
