= Maryvale, Queensland (Southern Downs Region) =

Maryvale
- Town
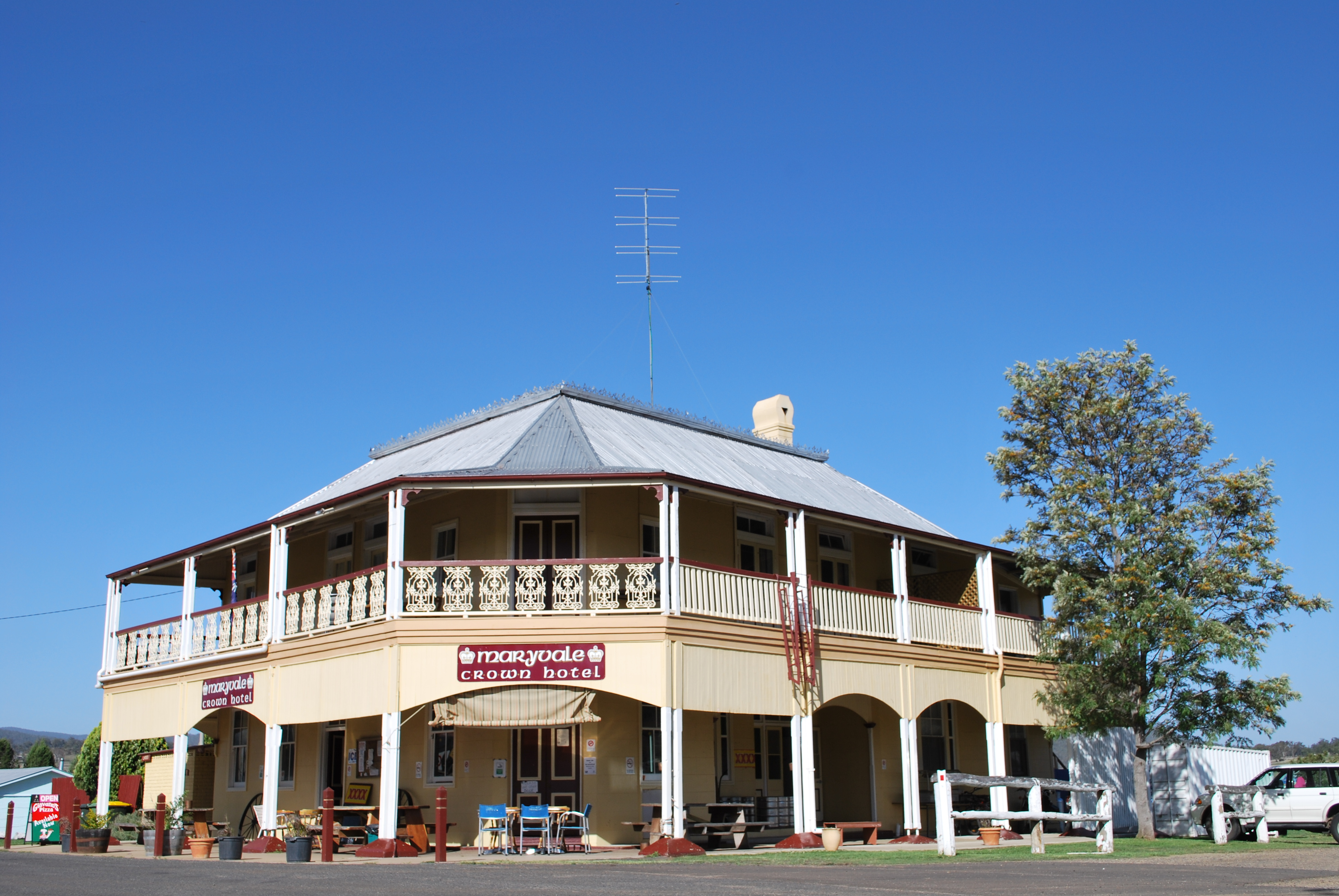
- The historic Crown Hotel at Maryvale

- Interactive map of Maryvale
- Coordinates: 28.0722°S 152.2391°E
- Country: Australia
- State: Queensland
- LGA: Southern Downs Region
- Location: 30.6 km (19.0 mi) NE of Warwick; 32.2 km (20.0 mi) E of Allora; 90.1 km (56.0 mi) SSE of Toowoomba; 129 km (80 mi) S of Brisbane

Government
  - State electorate: Southern Downs
  - Federal division: Maranoa

Area
  - Total: 82.3 km^{2} (31.8 sq mi)

Population
  - Total: 392 (2021 census)
  - Density: 4.763/km^{2} (12.336/sq mi)
- Time zone: UTC+10:00 (AEST)
- Postcode: 4370
Localities around Maryvale
Goomburra	Goomburra	North Branch
Gladfield	Maryvale	Tregony
Upper Freestone	Swanfels	Swanfels

Maryvale is a rural town and locality in the Southern Downs Region, Queensland, Australia. In the 2021 census, the locality of Maryvale had a population of 392.

== Geography ==
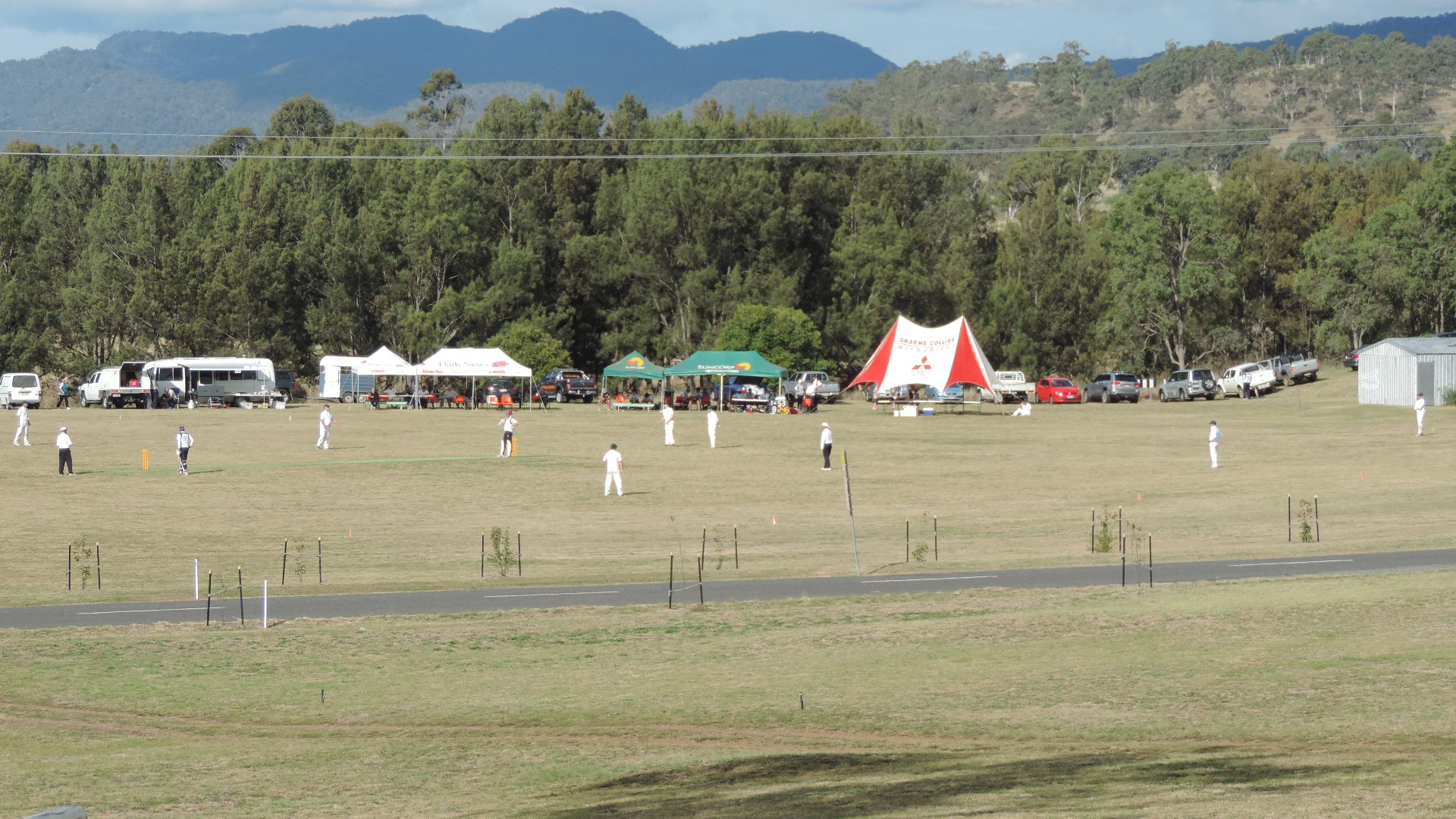
Cricket match, 2015

Maryvale is on the Darling Downs on the Cunningham Highway, 127 kilometres (79 mi) south west of the state capital, Brisbane.

Glengallan Creek which rises on the western slopes of the Main Range is a tributary of the Condamine River. It passes through the locality from east to west. The creek is a source of irrigated water for terraced crops in the area. At the southern and northern boundaries of Maryvale, elevations rise to greater than 900 m above sea level.

== History ==
The town's name is derived from a pastoral property name first used about 1847 probably by Patrick Leslie or James Hay.

A pastoral station was selected in the area in about 1840 by John Cameron. However, Cameron found it difficult to transport the wool from their sheep down through Cunninghams Gap to be sold. Therefore, he relocated into the Fassifern Valley in 1842. The pastoral run at Maryvale was sold to Arnold Weinholt Sr. in 1848.

In 1911 the Methodist Church and Presbyterian Church jointly established a church in Maryvale, but later it was operated solely by the Methodists.

On 30 September 1911, the Maryvale railway line opened from the Southern railway line to Maryvale railway station (the terminus, 28.07253°S 152.23948°E). Originally intended as a segment of a more direct (via recta) railway route from Brisbane to Sydney, the segment from Mount Edwards to Maryvale was never completed and the line remained a local branch line until it closed on 1 November 1960.

Maryvale State School opened on 21 April 1913.

Maryvale Post Office opened by March 1914 (a receiving office had been open from 1913) and closed in 1981.

On Monday 8 September 1924 the Reverend William Powning Glover placed the first stump into position for the construction of an Anglican Church on the site of the original Maryvale homestead built by Arnold Weinholt. It was considered an appropriate location as Canon Glennie, the first Anglican priest on the Darling Downs, had conducted services at the homestead. Glover announced the church would be dedicated to St Alban. On Sunday 22 February Archbishop Gerald Sharp opened and dedicated St Alban's Anglican Church. The church was built on 8 acres (3.2 ha) of ground and the architect was John Shedden Adam of Sydney, the brother-in-law of Reverend Glover.

== Demographics ==
In the 2021 census, the locality of Maryvale had a population of 392.

In the 2016 census, the locality of Maryvale had a population of 303.

In the 2011 census, the locality of Maryvale and the surrounding area had a population of 350.

== Education ==
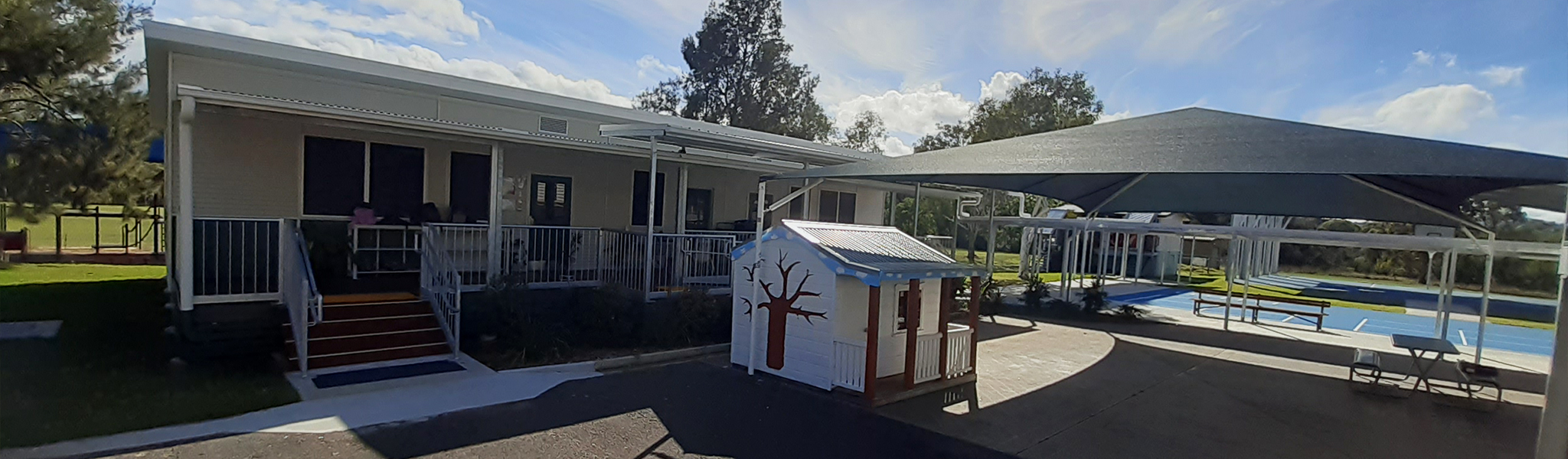
Maryvale State School, 2025

Maryvale State School is a government primary (Prep-6) school for boys and girls at 81 Taylor Street (28.0674°S 152.2420°E). In 2018, the school had an enrolment of 14 students with 2 teachers (1 full-time equivalent) and 3 non-teaching staff (1 full-time equivalent).

There are no secondary schools in Maryvale. The nearest government secondary schools are Allora State School (to Year 10) in Allora to the west and Warwick State High School in Warwick to the south-west.

There are also non-government schools in Allora and Warwick.

== Amenities ==
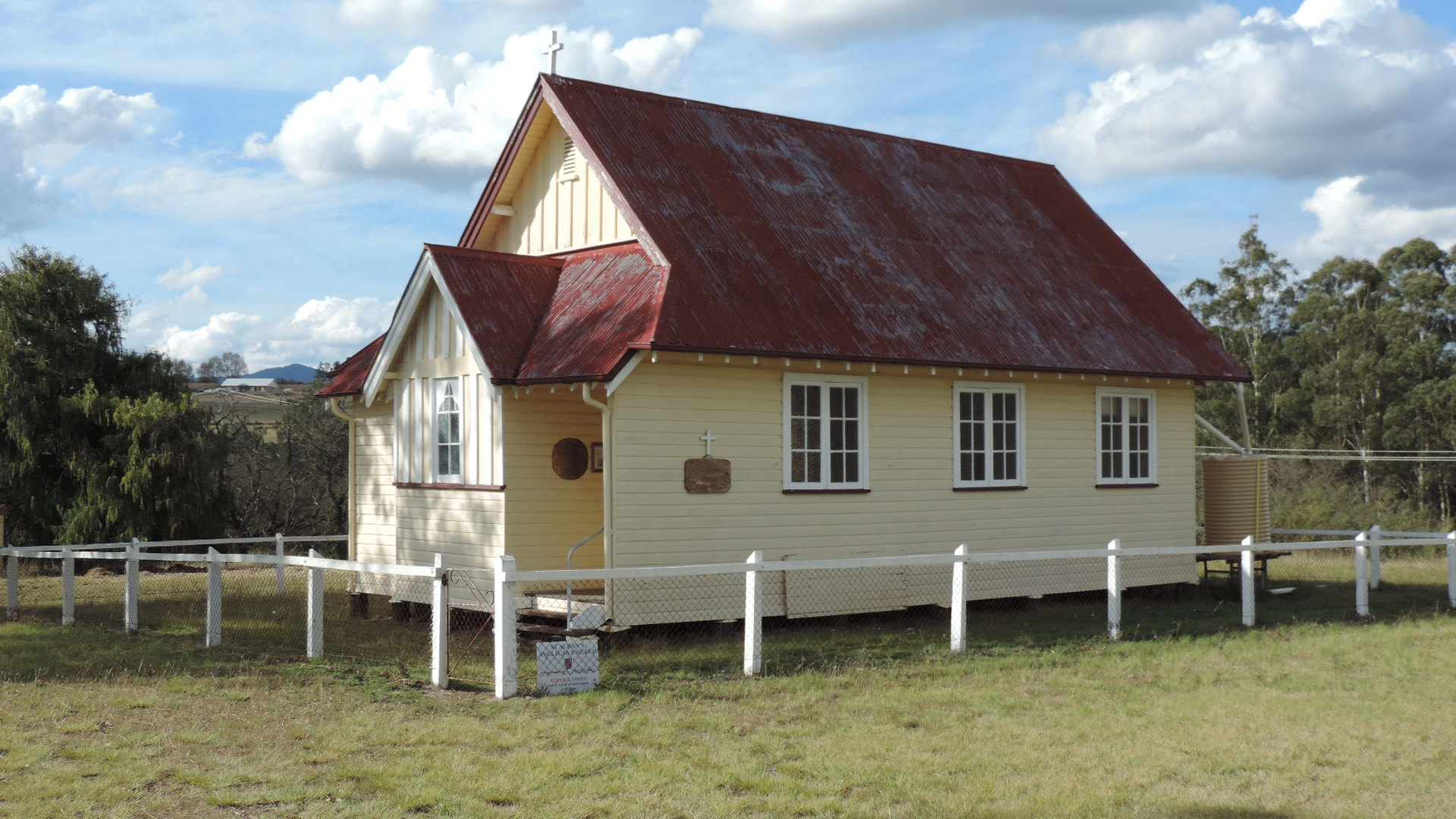
St Alban's Anglican Church, 2015

There are a number of parks in the locality, including:

- Maryvale Park (28.0718°S 152.2391°E)
- Millarvale Creek Park (28.0659°S 152.2426°E)
- Weinholt Street Park (28.0730°S 152.2411°E)

The Southern Downs Regional Council operates a mobile library service which visits Maryvale Park in Taylor Street.

St Alban's Anglican Church is at 36 Maryvale Road.
