= Yangan, Queensland =

Yangan
- Town
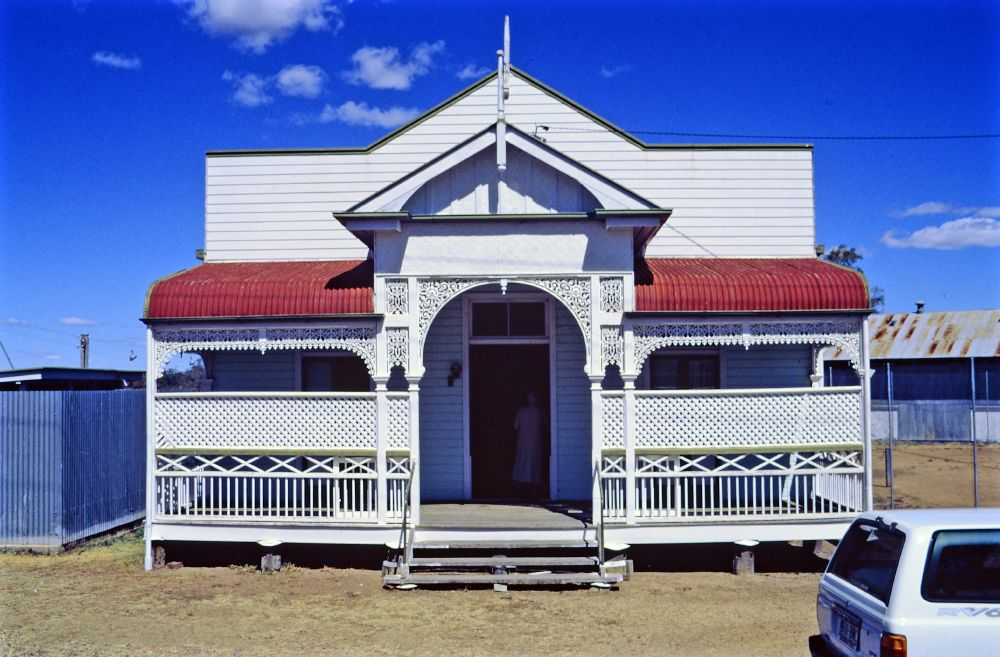
- Yangan School of Arts, 1995

- Interactive map of Yangan
- Coordinates: 28.1955°S 152.2113°E
- Country: Australia
- State: Queensland
- Region: Darling Downs
- LGA: Southern Downs Region
- Location: 19.5 km (12.1 mi) E of Warwick; 23.2 km (14.4 mi) N of Killarney; 99 km (62 mi) S of Toowoomba; 120 km (75 mi) SW of Ipswich; 161 km (100 mi) SW of Brisbane

Government
  - State electorate: Southern Downs
  - Federal division: Maranoa

Area
  - Total: 40.7 km^{2} (15.7 sq mi)

Population
  - Total: 404 (2021 census)
  - Density: 9.926/km^{2} (25.71/sq mi)
- Time zone: UTC+10:00 (AEST)
- Postcode: 4371
Localities around Yangan
Freestone	Mount Sturt	Swanfels
Swan Creek	Yangan	Emu Vale
Swan Creek	Junabee	Emu Vale

Yangan is a rural town and locality in the Southern Downs Region, Queensland, Australia. In the 2021 census, the locality of Yangan had a population of 404 people.

== Geography ==
The town is in the centre of the locality. The Warwick-Yangan Road enters the locality from the west (Swan Creek) and terminates in the town. The Yangan-Killarney Road commences in the town and exits the locality to the south-east (Emu Vale).

The locality is traversed by Swan Creek, a tributary of the Condamine River; it enters the locality from the north-east (Swanfels) and flows just south of the town and then exits to the south-west of the locality (Swan Creek).

Sandstone is extracted from quarries south of the town. Apart from this, the land use is a mixture of crop growing and grazing on native vegetation.

== History ==
The district was known as Upper Swan Creek, but in 1887 took the name Yangan from its railway station. The name Yangan is reported to be an Aboriginal word meaning proceed or go away.

Swan Creek (No. 2) School opened on 27 May 1874. In 1878, it was renamed Swan Creek Upper State School. In 1887 it became Yangan State School.

The Killarney railway line opened from Warwick to Emu Vale on 2 June 1884 which included the Mount Sturt railway station (28.20308°S 152.17916°E) and Yangan railway station (28.19533°S 152.20769°E), both of which are within the present-day boundaries of Yangan. The line closed on 1 May 1964.

On Monday 15 May 1905, the Bishop of Brisbane St Clair Donaldson consecrated the new Anglican church, St Peter's. The architect was Conrad Dornbusch and the contractor was Mr J. Purcell. The final service was held on Palm Sunday 25 March 2018 and a deconsecration service was held on Saturday 21 July 2018.

== Demographics ==
In the 2016 census, the locality of Yangan had a population of 386 people.

In the 2021 census, the locality of Yangan had a population of 404 people.

== Heritage listings ==
Yangan has a number of heritage-listed sites, including:

- Yangan School of Arts, 7–9 King Street (28.1965°S 152.2093°E)
- Yangan Masonic Hall, 36 King Street (28.1961°S 152.2112°E)

== Education ==
Yangan State School is a government primary (Prep–6) school for boys and girls at 49A King Street (28.1976°S 152.2155°E). In 2017, the school had an enrolment of 90 students with 7 teachers (6 full-time equivalent) and 7 non-teaching staff (4 full-time equivalent). In 2018, the school had an enrolment of 96 students with 7 teachers (6 full-time equivalent) and 7 non-teaching staff (4 full-time equivalent).

There are no secondary schools in Yangan. The nearest government secondary schools are Warwick State High School (to Year 12) in Warwick to the west and Killarney State School (to Year 10) in Killarney to the south-east.

== Amenities ==
The Southern Downs Regional Council operates a mobile library service which visits Yangan Park in King Street.
