= Gladfield, Queensland =

Gladfield
- Suburb
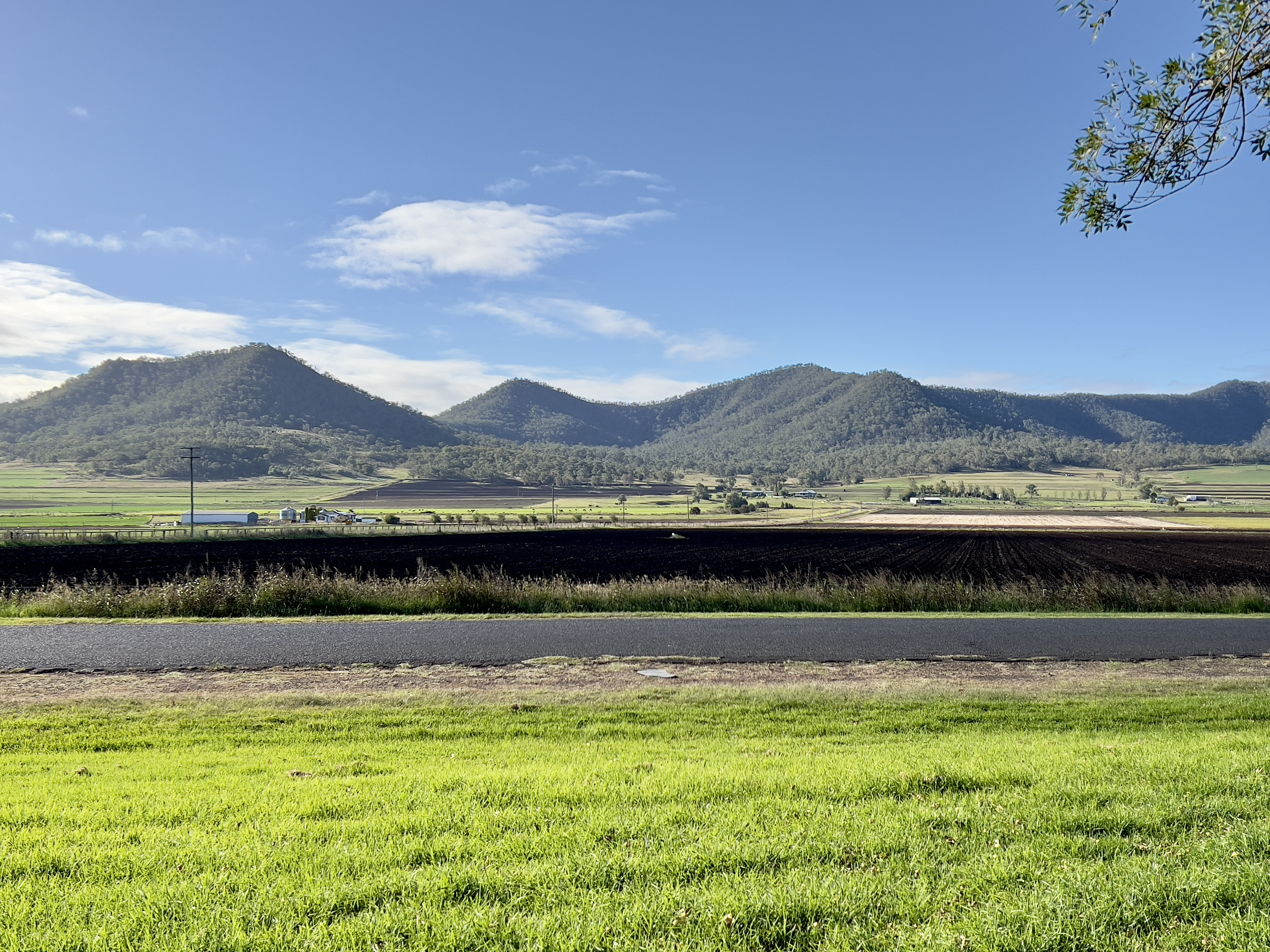
- Great Dividing Range as seen from Gladfield, 2023

- Interactive map of Gladfield
- Coordinates: 28.0638°S 152.1788°E
- Country: Australia
- State: Queensland
- LGA: Southern Downs Region
- Location: 25.2 km (15.7 mi) E of Allora; 24.3 km (15.1 mi) NW of Warwick; 84.1 km (52.3 mi) S of Toowoomba; 133 km (83 mi) SW of Brisbane

Government
  - State electorate: Southern Downs
  - Federal division: Maranoa

Area
  - Total: 35.6 km^{2} (13.7 sq mi)

Population
  - Total: 71 (2021 census)
  - Density: 1.994/km^{2} (5.17/sq mi)
- Time zone: UTC+10:00 (AEST)
- Postcode: 4370
Suburbs around Gladfield
Goomburra	Goomburra	Maryvale
Clintonvale	Gladfield	Maryvale
Freestone	Upper Freestone	Upper Freestone

Gladfield is a rural locality in the Southern Downs Region, Queensland, Australia. In the 2021 census, Gladfield had a population of 71 people.

== History ==
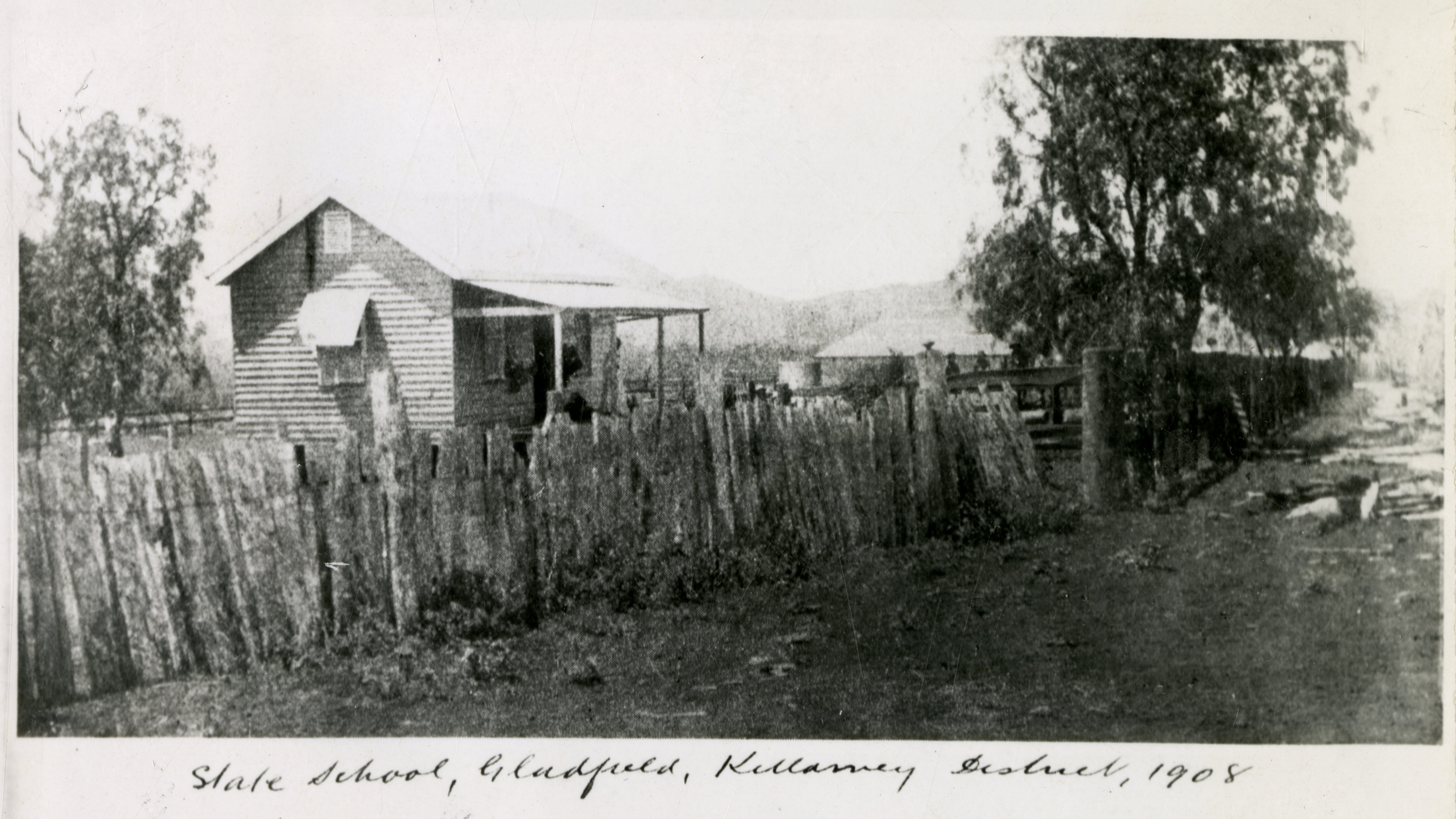
Gladfield State School, 1908

The locality name was derived from a pastoral run taken up in the 1840s, first by the Leslie brothers and later by Neil Ross who sold it in 1852, later becoming party of the Maryvale run.

Gladfield Provisional School opened on 1 August 1887. On 1 January 1909, it became Gladfield State School. It closed in 1967. It was at 13 Gladfield Back Road (28.07655°S 152.18528°E). The school building was still extant on the site in October 2008.

== Demographics ==
In the 2016 census, Gladfield had a population of 57 people.

In the 2021 census, Gladfield had a population of 71 people.

== Education ==
There are no schools in Gladfield. The nearest government primary schools are Maryvale State School in neighbouring Maryvale to the east and Freestone State School in neighbouring Freestone to the south-west. The nearest government secondary schools are Allora State School (to Year 10) in Allora to the west and Warwick State High School (to Year 12) in Warwick to the south-west.
