= Freestone, Queensland =

Freestone
- Town
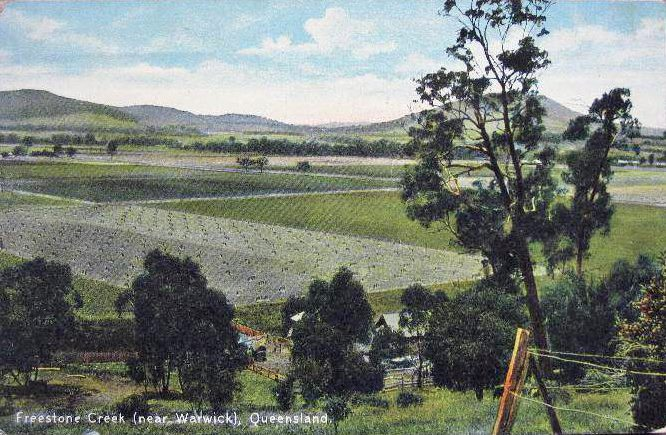
- Freestone, circa 1910

- Interactive map of Freestone
- Coordinates: 28.1292°S 152.1342°E
- Country: Australia
- State: Queensland
- LGA: Southern Downs Region
- Location: 15.6 km (9.7 mi) NW of Warwick, Queensland; 84.5 km (52.5 mi) S of Toowoomba; 106 km (66 mi) SW of Ipswich; 146 km (91 mi) SW of Brisbane

Government
  - State electorate: Southern Downs
  - Federal division: Maranoa

Area
  - Total: 56.3 km^{2} (21.7 sq mi)

Population
  - Total: 208 (2021 census)
  - Density: 3.694/km^{2} (9.569/sq mi)
- Time zone: UTC+10:00 (AEST)
- Postcode: 4370
Localities around Freestone
Clintonvale	Gladfield	Upper Freestone
Sladevale	Freestone	Upper Freestone
Swan Creek	Yangan	Mount Sturt

Freestone is a rural town and locality in the Southern Downs Region, Queensland, Australia. In the 2021 census, the locality of Freestone had a population of 208 people.

== Geography ==
Freestone is predominantly flat farming land (500–600 metres above sea level) with the northernmost part of the locality being the Mount Dumaresq Conservation Park containing Mount Dumaresq (28.095°S 152.1738°E) at 826 metres (2,710 ft).

== History ==
Mount Dumaresq was named by explorer Allan Cunningham on 8 June 1827, probably after road engineer William John Dumaresq, the brother-in-law of the New South Wales Governor Ralph Darling.

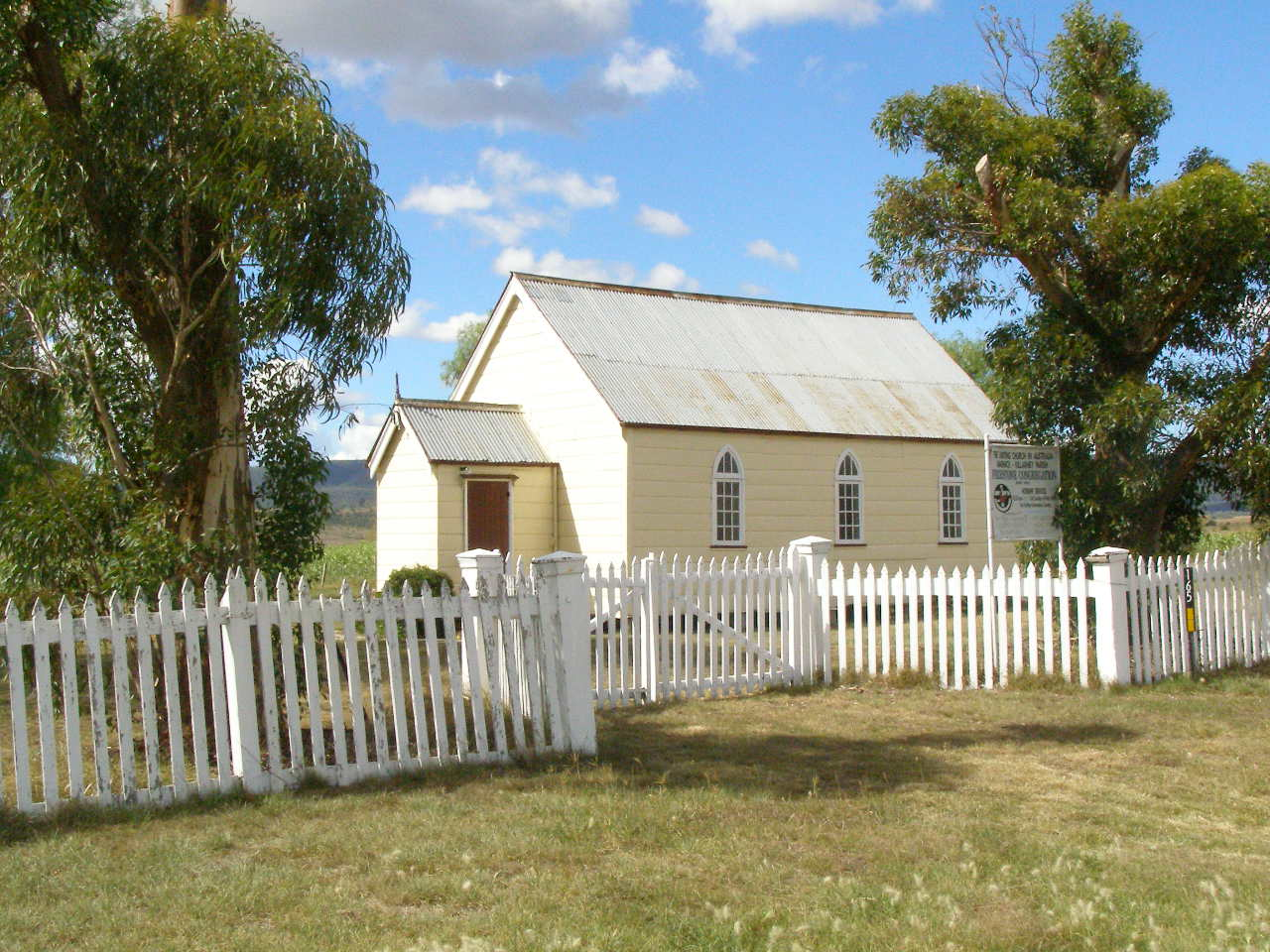
Freestone Uniting Church, 2007

In about 1864 Rev. J.B. Watkin, a Wesleyan, commenced services in private homes in the area. On 2 January 1865, a public meeting was held to erect a chapel for regular services. James and Charles G. Wilson donated the land on their property adjacent to the main Freestone Road. On Sunday 4 February 1866, the first service was held in the new Freestone Wesleyan Methodist Church, a wooden building 24 by 15 feet (7.3 by 4.6 m) at a cost of £64 4s 1d of which £50 was already promised. Much of the labour for the building was donated. Later the church was relocated on the Wilson's property to its present location (165 Freestone Creek Road) where it was enlarged to be 35 by 21 feet (10.7 by 6.4 m). Following the amalgamation of the Methodist Church into the Uniting Church in Australia in the 1970s, it became the Freestone Uniting Church. On 2 February 2020 following a renovation, the church was re-dedicated to the glory of God. In March 2020 the congregation decided to replace their 9am service with a 2pm service to avoid clashing with the milking times of the local dairy farmers.

Freestone Creek State School opened on 1 August 1870. In 1876 it renamed Freestone Creek Lower State School. In 1940, it was renamed Freestone State School.

The Freestone Creek (Lower) Receiving office opened in 1873 and became a full Post Office in 1875. On September 1, 1876 it was once again listed as a Receiving office. The name of the Receiving office was changed from Freestone Creek to Lower Freestone Creek in January 1880. It was listed as a Post Office in 1927, and closed in May 1973.

The opening was held on 30 September 1911 of the Maryvale branch line of the railway from Warwick which passed through Freestone Creek. The branch line was closed around 1 November 1960.

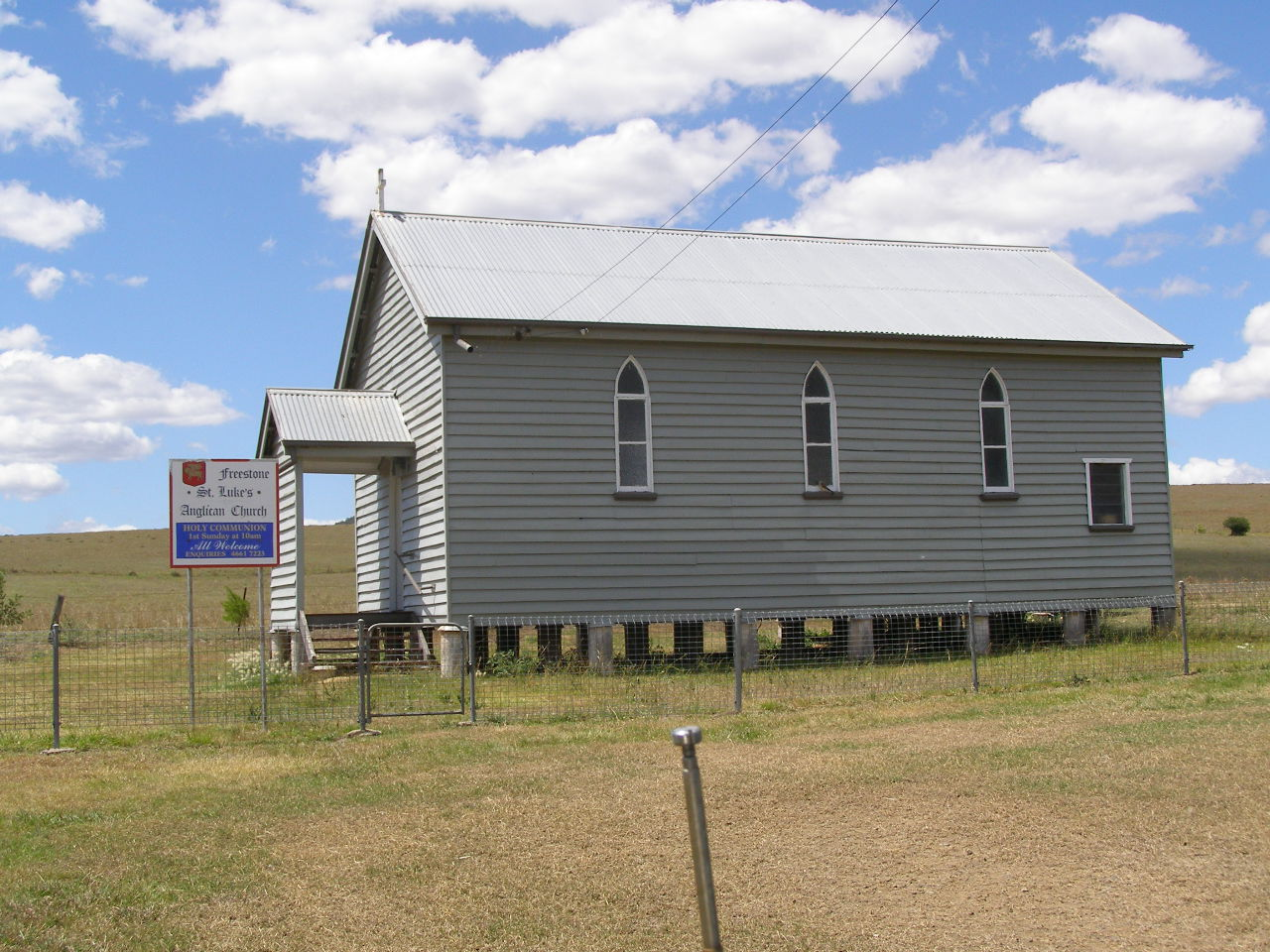
St Luke's Anglican Church, 2007

On 5 June 1883, the Society for Promoting Christian Knowledge based in London gave £20 towards constructing a wooden church at Freestone Creek. The land was donated by the Palmer family. However it was not until August 1898 that the church (also described as a mission hall) was built at a total cost of £175. Although not entirely completed, it opened for its first service on Sunday 4 September 1898. The church was at 185 Paynes Road (28.1269°S 152.1534°E). Seven years later, the "new" church was dedicated to St Luke by the Anglican Bishop of Brisbane St Clair Donaldson on Tuesday 31 October 1905. Due to a dwindling and ageing population, the last service was held at St Luke's on 31 March 2018 (Easter Saturday) and it was deconsecrated on 7 July 2018 by Bishop Cameron Venables. It was sold for $95,000 to artist Sue Keong for conversion to an artist's retreat.

The Freestone School of Arts officially opened on Wednesday 6 March 1901 despite very heavy rain. The contractor was Joseph Woodcock at a cost of £128 15s. The building was originally located at the corner of Freestone Creek Road and Jack Smith's Gully Road (28.1430°S 152.1561°E). It was relocated to its present site in 1922 officially reopening on Saturday 2 September 1922. In March 1946 it was being considered that the hall should be improved and renamed Freestone Memorial Hall in honour of soldiers who died. After several years of fundraising the hall was finally renovated and enlarged. An official re-opening ball was held on Saturday 5 September 1953.

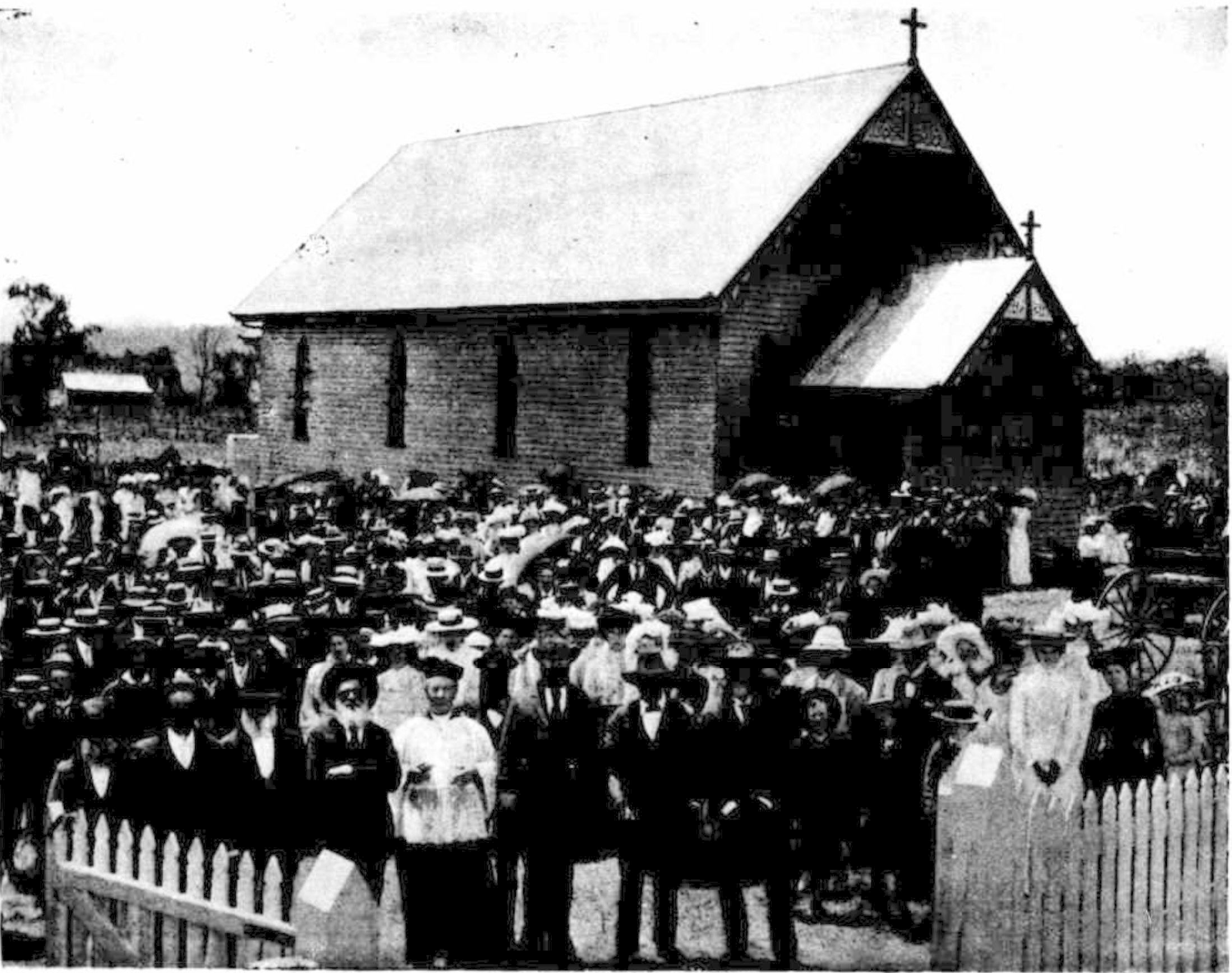
Opening ceremony, St Lawrence O'Toole Catholic church, 1903

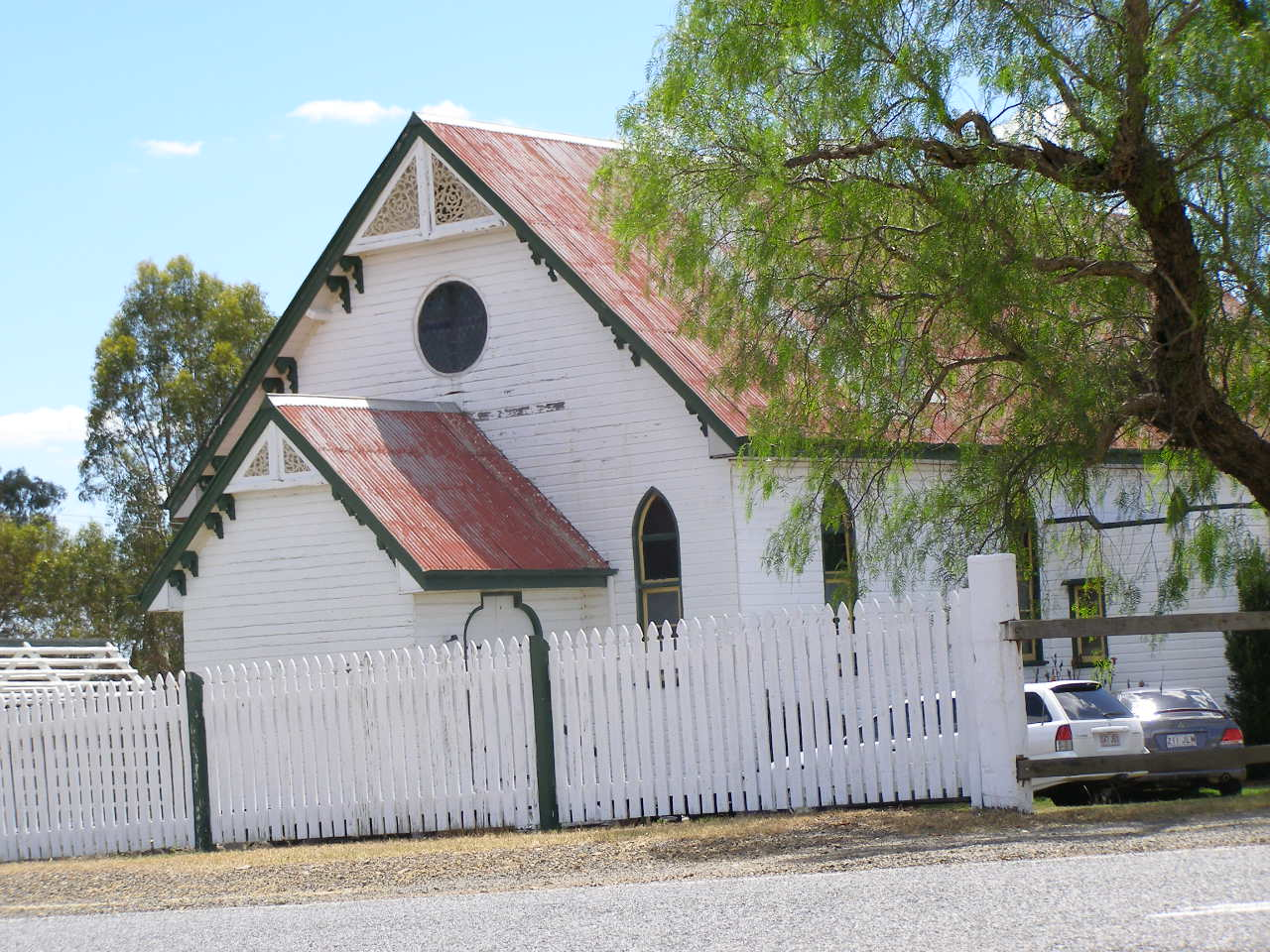
Former St Lawrence O'Toole Roman Catholic Church, 2007

St Lawrence O’Toole Roman Catholic church was built in 1903 on land bought from the Glengallan Shire Council for £8. The opening ceremony on Sunday 15 November 1903 in which Archbishop of Brisbane Robert Dunne dedicated the timber church to St Lawrence O'Toole, the heroic saint of Ireland. The ceremony was attended by over 500 people. Prior to the construction of the church, Mass had been held in the homes of Mrs J Ryan and Mr E and Mrs J Nolan. The church is at 1345 Freestone Road (28.1223°S 152.1351°E). By the 1980s, the congregation was dwindling and the church was closed with the last Mass being celebrated on 25 September 1983. The church building remains and is now used as a residence.

The Freestone branch of the Queensland Country Women's Association was established on 31 July 1946 with 36 initial members.

== Demographics ==
In the 2016 census, the locality of Freestone had a population of 217 people.

In the 2021 census, the locality of Freestone had a population of 208 people.

== Education ==
Freestone State School is a government primary (Prep–6) school for boys and girls at 82 School Road (28.1355°S 152.1377°E). In 2018, the school had an enrolment of 27 students with 4 teachers (3 full-time equivalent) and 6 non-teaching staff (2 full-time equivalent).

There are no secondary schools in Freestone; the nearest government secondary school is Warwick State High School in Warwick to the south-west.

== Amenities ==
The Freestone Memorial Hall is at 1244 Freestone Road (28.1314°S 152.1338°E) and can be hired for events.

Monthly services are held at the Freestone Uniting Church at 165 Freestone Creek Road (28.1424°S 152.1484°E). It is now part of the Warwick- Killarney Parish of the Uniting Church in Australia.
