= Swanfels, Queensland =

Swanfels
- Suburb
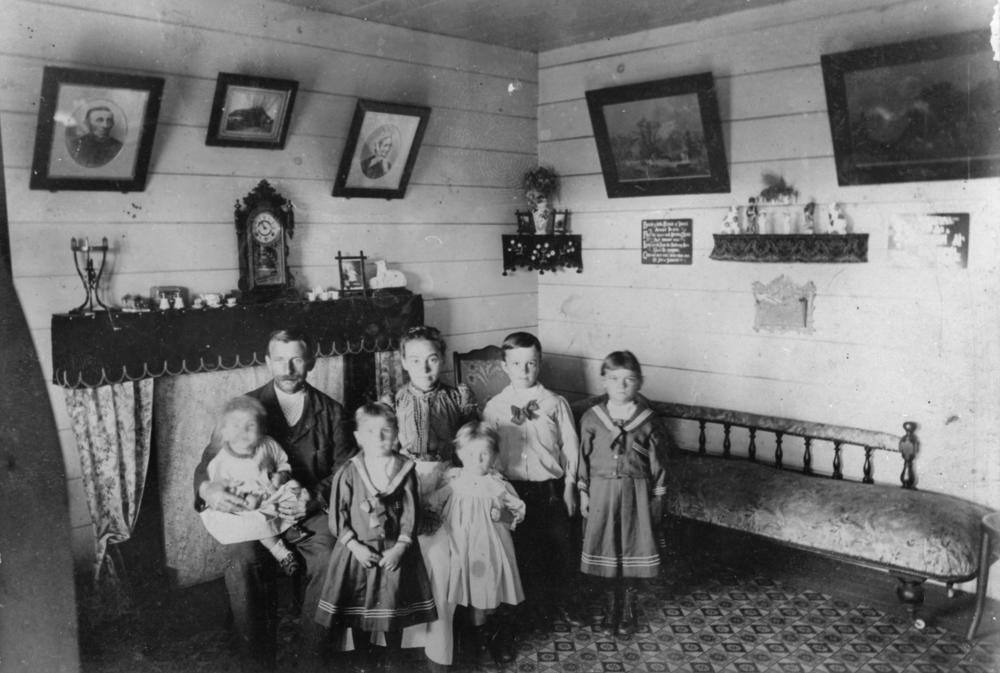
- Andersen family photographed in their living room at Swanfels, cira 1900

- Interactive map of Swanfels
- Coordinates: 28.1405°S 152.3188°E
- Country: Australia
- State: Queensland
- LGA: Southern Downs Region
- Location: 26.0 km (16.2 mi) N of Killarney; 26.4 km (16.4 mi) ENE of Warwick; 105 km (65 mi) SSE of Toowoomba; 167 km (104 mi) SW of Brisbane

Government
  - State electorate: Southern Downs
  - Federal division: Maranoa

Area
  - Total: 126.8 km^{2} (49.0 sq mi)

Population
  - Total: 131 (2021 census)
  - Density: 1.033/km^{2} (2.676/sq mi)
- Time zone: UTC+10:00 (AEST)
- Postcode: 4371
Suburbs around Swanfels
Upper Freestone	Maryvale	Tregony
Mount Sturt	Swanfels	Clumber
Yangan	Emu Vale	Emu Vale

Swanfels is a rural locality in the Southern Downs Region, Queensland, Australia. In the 2021 census, Swanfels had a population of 131 people.

== History ==
Swanfels Provisional School opened on 18 January 1892. In 1893-4, it became Swanfels State School. It closed on 12 December 1980. It was at 509 Top Swanfels Road (28.1756°S 152.2663°E).

The Swanfels Pioneers' Memorial Park was established in 1983.

== Demographics ==
In the 2016 census, Swanfels had a population of 132 people.

In the 2021 census, Swanfels had a population of 131 people.

== Education ==
There are no schools in Swanfels. The nearest government primary schools are Yangan State School in neighbouring Yangan to the south-west, Freestone State School in Freestone to the west, and Maryvale State School in neighbouring Maryvale to the north. The nearest government secondary schools are Warwick State High School (to Year 12) in Warwick to the south-west and Killarney State School (to Year 10) in Killarney to the south.

There are also some non-government schools in Warwick.

== Attractions ==
Swanfels Pioneers' Memorial Park is at 502 Swanfels Road (28.16936°S 152.26324°E). It commemorates local pioneer families.
