= Emu Vale, Queensland =

Emu Vale
- Town
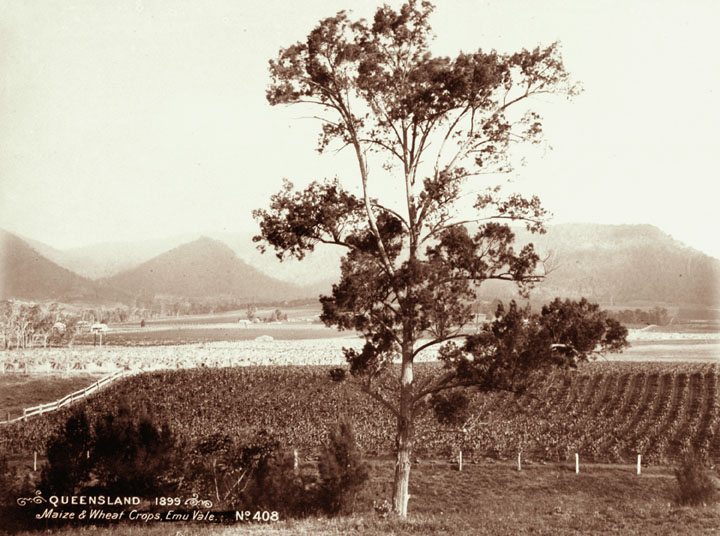
- Maize and Wheat Crops, Emu Vale, circa 1899

- Interactive map of Emu Vale
- Coordinates: 28.2288°S 152.2488°E
- Country: Australia
- State: Queensland
- LGA: Southern Downs Region
- Location: 16.9 km (10.5 mi) N of Killarney; 25.8 km (16.0 mi) E of Warwick; 105 km (65 mi) SSE of Toowoomba; 166 km (103 mi) SW of Brisbane

Government
  - State electorate: Southern Downs
  - Federal division: Maranoa

Area
  - Total: 163.5 km^{2} (63.1 sq mi)

Population
  - Total: 161 (2021 census)
  - Density: 0.985/km^{2} (2.550/sq mi)
- Time zone: UTC+10:00 (AEST)
- Postcode: 4371
Localities around Emu Vale
Yangan	Swanfels	Clumber
Junabee; Danderoo	Emu Vale	Moogerah
Tannymorel	Mount Colliery	Carneys Creek

Emu Vale is a rural town and locality in the Southern Downs Region, Queensland, Australia. In the 2021 census, the locality of Emu Vale had a population of 161 people.

== Geography ==
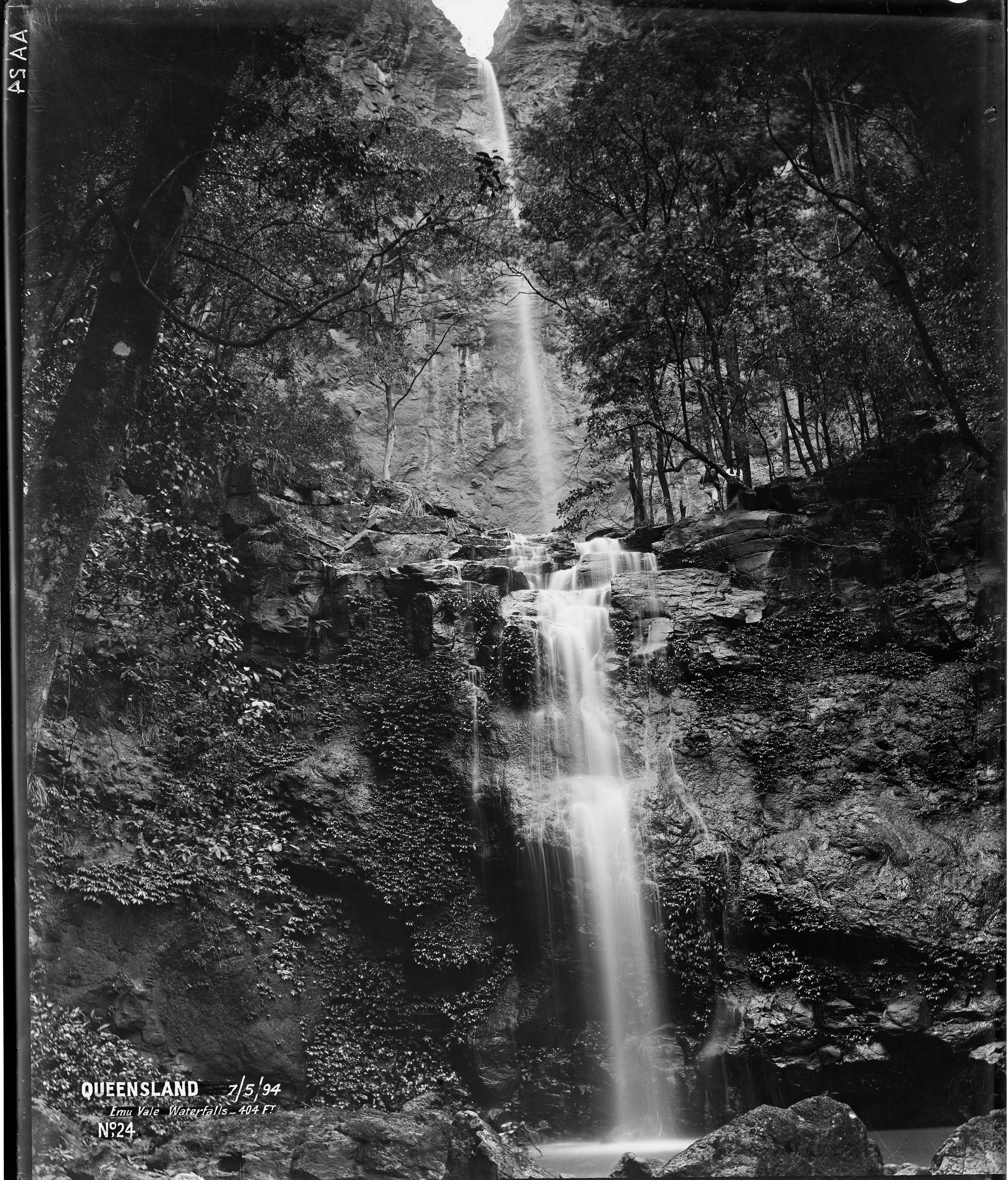
Emu Vale Waterfalls, 1894

The locality is bounded to the east by the Main Range section of the Great Dividing Range. The terrain is mountainous with elevations ranging from 490 to 1,360 metres (1,610 to 4,460 ft) above sea level. There are a number of named peaks (from north to south):

- Mount Huntley (28.1427°S 152.4318°E) 1,262 metres (4,140 ft)
- Sentinel Point (28.1603°S 152.3928°E) 1,169 metres (3,835 ft)
- Mount Bauer (28.1780°S 152.3314°E) 1,145 metres (3,757 ft)
- Mount Guymer (28.1948°S 152.3886°E) 1,203 metres (3,947 ft)
- Mount Steamer (28.1964°S 152.4529°E) 1,196 metres (3,924 ft) with its "Steamers"
  - Stern (28.1993°S 152.4452°E) 1,075 metres (3,527 ft)
  - Mast (28.2009°S 152.4355°E) 1,056 metres (3,465 ft)
  - Funnel (28.2046°S 152.4297°E) 1,026 metres (3,366 ft)
  - Prow (28.2093°S 152.4174°E) 1,043 metres (3,422 ft)
- Mitchells Peak (28.2070°S 152.2555°E) 833 metres (2,733 ft)
- Hoffmans Peak (28.2157°S 152.3314°E) 1,035 metres (3,396 ft)

The Steamers are distinctive rock formations, which are thought to be from a thick trachyte lava flow from the Main Range volcano which was active 24 million years ago. They look like an old steamship with four high protruding peaks representing its Stern, Prow, Funnel and Mast.

Most of the north-east of the locality is within the Main Range National Park. Apart from this protected area, the land use is mostly crop growing in the south-east (the lower flatter area around the town) and grazing on native vegetation elsewhere.

== History ==
The town takes its name from the Emu Vale railway station on the Killarney railway line, which is believed to be named after an early pastoral run.

A sawmill was established on 5 acres (2.0 ha) of land at Upper Emu Creek byJames McAra, George Hall, Thomas Hall and William Hall. It was operating by April 1873.

Emu Vale Provisional School opened on 2 February 1876. It became Emu Vale State School on 20 January 1879. It was closed on 31 December 2003. The school was located on the triangle land parcel on the north-west corner of Yangan Killarney Road and Emu Creek Road (28.2237°S 152.2479°E). The school site was then split into two sections with the western part becoming Emu Vale Park and the eastern part with the former school buildings now being used as holiday accommodation. The school's website was archived.

Land in Emu Vale was open for selection on 17 April 1877; 75 square miles (190 km^{2}) were available.

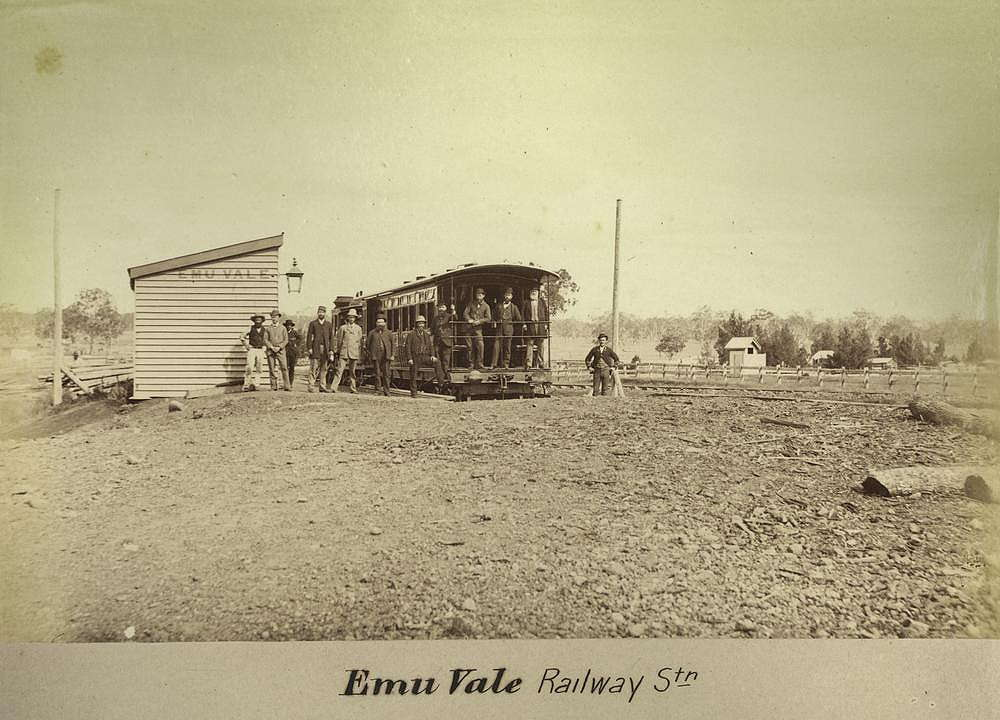
Emu Vale railway station, ca. 1890

The first section of the Killarney railway line from Warwick was 24 kilometres (15 mi) long and terminated at Emu Vale. The contract to build the first section was given to John Garget on 22 November 1881, but progress was delayed when the Queensland Railway Department was unable to provide the locomotives and wagons need to carry the construction materials. The first section to Emu Vale railway station opened on 2 June 1884. It was officially opened with a train from Warwick decorated with flags and greenery with several hundred passengers on board. The second section of the railway from Emu Vale to Killarney railway station was also built by Garget and completed on 22 August 1885.

In 1898, the Post and Telegraph and Postal Note Office previously known as Neereeadah was changed to Emu Vale.

In 1911, A. and D. Munro established a sawmill beside Emu Creek at the confluence of its north and south branches. The mill closed two years later.

Rocky Mountain Provisional School opened in 1919 and closed circa 1920. It was on Emu Creek Road (approx 28.2080°S 152.3658°E).

Boldery and Brett built a sawmill in 1928 near the confluence of Emu Creek and Emu Creek South (28.2103°S 152.39715°E). Following some changes in ownership, the sawmill closed in 1968.

By 1931, the Holy Redeemer Catholic Church had been established.

Emu Creek Upper Provisional School opened on 23 February 1942 in conjunction with the sawmill built by Boldery and Brett. It closed in 1956 but reopened in 1957. It closed permanently in 1960. It was on the northern side of Emu Creek Road (approx 28.2114°S 152.3977°E). A plaque was placed at the school's location on 26 March 2005 by Alan Barclay Skinner, the last teacher at the school.

The Emu Vale Memorial Hall was officially opened on Saturday 28 May 1954 by Sir Raymond Huish.

== Demographics ==
In the 2016 census, the locality of Emu Vale had a population of 185 people.

In the 2021 census, the locality of Emu Vale had a population of 161 people.

== Education ==
There are no schools in Emu Vale. The nearest government primary school is Yangan State School in neighbouring Yangan to the north-east. The nearest government secondary schools are Killarney State School (to Year 10) in Killarney to the south and Warwick State High School in Warwick to the west.

== Community groups ==
The Emu Vale branch of the Queensland Country Women's Association meets at the Emu Vale Memorial Hall at 559 Yangan Killarney Road (28.2297°S 152.2474°E).
