= Mount Marshall, Queensland =

Mount Marshall
- Suburb
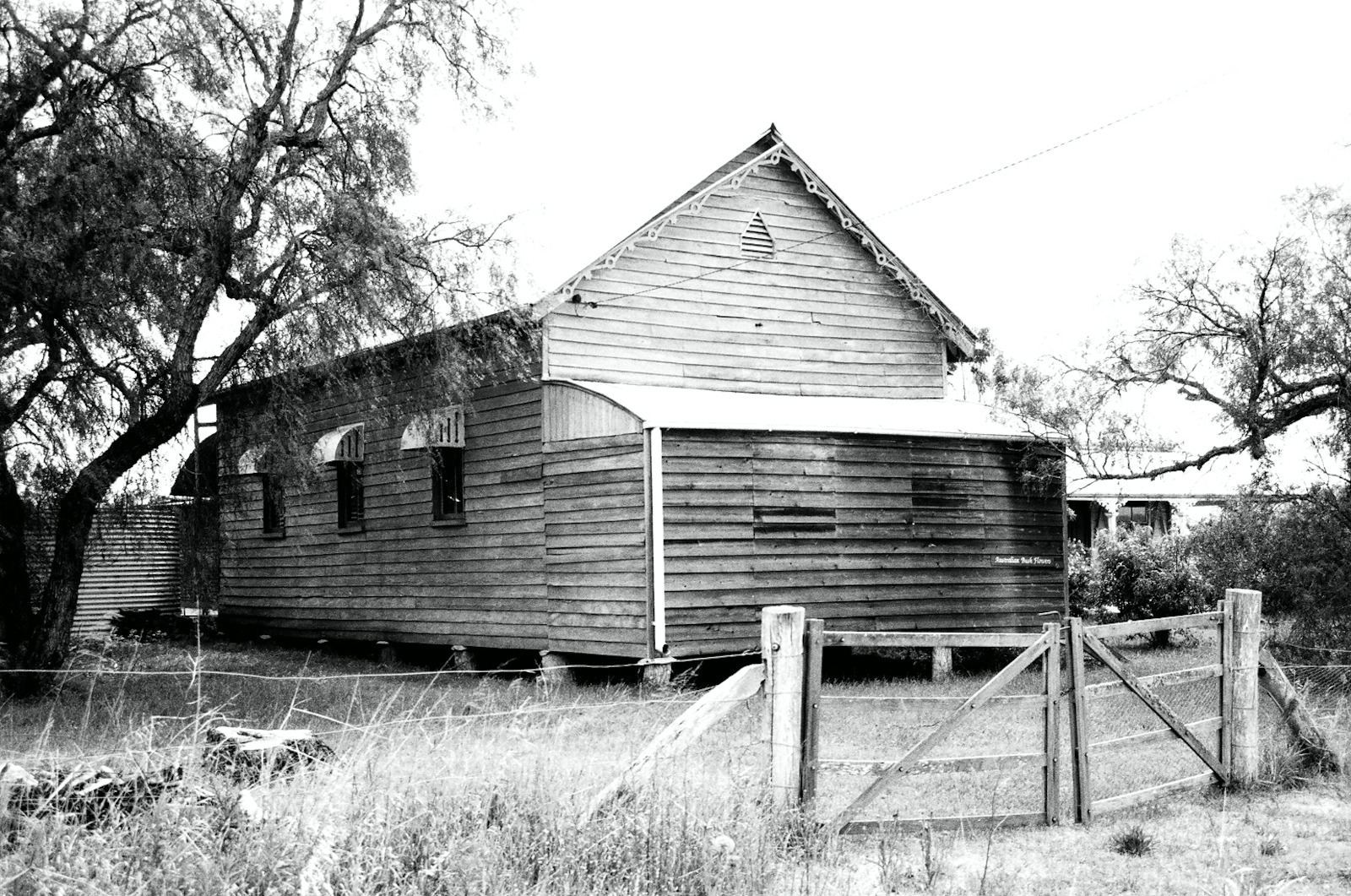
- Mount Marshall public hall, 1966

- Interactive map of Mount Marshall
- Coordinates: 28.0794°S 152.0394°E
- Country: Australia
- State: Queensland
- LGA: Southern Downs Region
- Location: 7.0 km (4.3 mi) SE of Allora; 19.0 km (11.8 mi) N of Warwick; 65.2 km (40.5 mi) S of Toowoomba; 153 km (95 mi) SW of Brisbane

Government
  - State electorate: Southern Downs
  - Federal division: Maranoa

Area
  - Total: 25.0 km^{2} (9.7 sq mi)

Population
  - Total: 229 (2021 census)
  - Density: 9.16/km^{2} (23.72/sq mi)
- Time zone: UTC+10:00 (AEST)
- Postcode: 4362
Suburbs around Mount Marshall
Allora	Berat	Berat
Hendon	Mount Marshall	Clintonvale
Deuchar	Willowvale	Glengallan

Mount Marshall is a rural locality in the Southern Downs Region, Queensland, Australia. In the 2021 census, Mount Marshall had a population of 229 people.

== Geography ==
The New England Highway enters the locality from the south (Glengallan) and exits to the north (Allora/Berat).

The land use is principally cropping with some grazing on native vegetation. There is an area of rural residential housing in the centre of the locality (approx 28.073°S 152.032°E).

== History ==
The locality presumably takes its name from the mountain Mount Marshall (28.0955°S 152.0715°E) rising to 601 metres (1,972 ft), which is to the south-east of the locality in neighbouring Glengallan.

Glengallan Station School opened circa 1886 for the education for the children of staff of Glengallan Homestead. In 1891 it became Glengallan Provisional School. On 1 January 1909 it became Glengallon State School. It closed in 1921. In late 1922 or early 1923 it was amalgamated with Wilsonville State School to become Mount Marshall State School. It closed in 1965. It was on the south-western corner of Hendon Mount Marshall Road and the New England Highway (28.0815°S 152.0394°E).

In October 1937, Mount Marshall Public Hall was opened. It was formerly the Hendon Hall that was relocated to Mount Marshall.

== Demographics ==
In the 2011 census, Mount Marshall had a population of 231 people.

In the 2016 census, Mount Marshall had a population of 243 people.

In the 2021 census, Mount Marshall had a population of 229 people.

== Economy ==
There are a number of homesteads in the locality:

- Ashley Park (28.0817°S 152.0555°E)
- Brae Brook (28.0845°S 152.0165°E)
- Calinda (28.0800°S 152.0664°E)
- Galloway Farm (28.0730°S 152.0341°E)
- Nadele Park (28.0820°S 152.0798°E)
- Rockcrest (28.0804°S 152.0045°E)
- Yalmba (28.0817°S 152.0128°E)

== Education ==
There are no school in Mount Marshall. The nearest government primary school is Allora State School in neighbouring Allora to the north-west. The nearest government secondary school are Allora State School (to Year 10). For education to Year 12, the nearest government secondary schools are Clifton State High School in Clifton to the north-west and Warwick State High School in Warwick to the south.
