= Berat, Queensland =

Berat
- Suburb
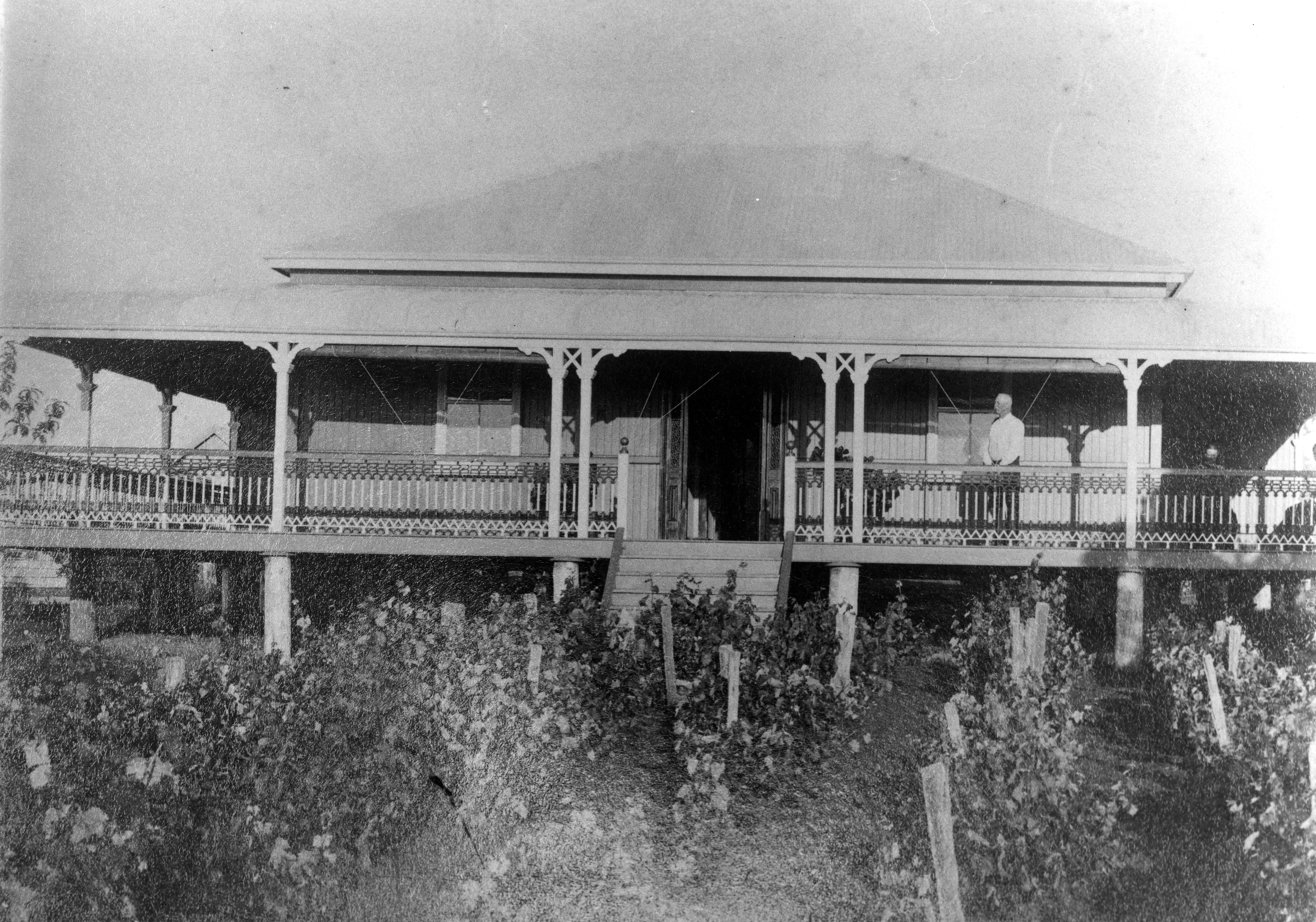
- Residence of James Henry Gwynne, Berat

- Interactive map of Berat
- Coordinates: 28.0447°S 152.0608°E
- Country: Australia
- State: Queensland
- LGA: Southern Downs Region
- Location: 24.9 km (15.5 mi) N of Warwick; 25.8 km (16.0 mi) SE of Clifton; 65.7 km (40.8 mi) S of Toowoomba; 150 km (93 mi) SW of Brisbane

Government
  - State electorate: Southern Downs
  - Federal division: Maranoa

Area
  - Total: 36.0 km^{2} (13.9 sq mi)
- Elevation: 480 to 765 m (1,575 to 2,510 ft)

Population
  - Total: 129 (2021 census)
  - Density: 3.583/km^{2} (9.28/sq mi)
- Time zone: UTC+10:00 (AEST)
- Postcode: 4362
Suburbs around Berat
Forest Springs	Forest Springs	Goomburra
Allora	Berat	Goomburra
Mount Marshall	Mount Marshall	Clintonvale

Berat is a rural locality in the Southern Downs Region, Queensland, Australia. In the 2021 census, Berat had a population of 129 people.

== Geography ==
Motts Hill is in the south-east of the locality (28.0653°S 152.0325°E) rising to 593 metres (1,946 ft) above sea level. The elevation across the locality rises from a low of 480 metres (1,570 ft) in the west of the locality to 765 metres (2,510 ft) in the south-east of the locality.

Dalrymple Creek enters the locality from the east (Goomburra) and exits to the west (Allora); the creek is ultimately a tributary of the Condamine River. It is believed to be named after Ernest George Beck Elphinstone Dalrymple, an early pastoralist on the Darling Downs circa 1840-41.

Goomburra Road enters the locality from the south-east (Allora / Mount Marshall) and exits to the east (Goomburra).

There were three railway stations in the locality, all on the now-closed Goomburra railway line (from west to east):

- Kital railway station (28.0430°S 152.0308°E)
- Berat railway station (28.0459°S 152.0548°E)
- Kunda railway station (28.0482°S 152.0875°E)

The land use is a mixture of crop growing (mostly on the lower elevations) and grazing on native vegetation (mostly on the higher elevations).

== History ==
Dalrymple Creek Provisional School opened on 15 June 1887. In 1890, it became Dalrymple Creek State School. In 1907, the name was changed to Forest Plains State School. In 1914, it was renamed Berat State School. It closed on 9 October 1944. It was at 405 Goomburra Road (28.0387°S 152.0499°E).

== Demographics ==
In the 2016 census, Berat had a population of 123 people.

In the 2021 census, Berat had a population of 129 people.

== Education ==
There are no schools in Berat. The nearest government primary schools are Allora State School in neighbouring Allora to the west and Freestone State School in Freestone to the south-east. The nearest government secondary schools are Allora State School (to Year 10) in Allora, Clifton State High School in Clifton to the north-west, and Warwick State High School in Warwick to the south.
