= Black Duck Creek, Queensland =

Black Duck Creek
- Suburb
- Interactive map of Black Duck Creek
- Coordinates: 27.8966°S 152.2202°E
- Country: Australia
- State: Queensland
- LGA: Lockyer Valley Region
- Location: 56.6 km (35.2 mi) SSW of Gatton; 60.8 km (37.8 mi) SE of Toowoomba; 132 km (82 mi) SW of Brisbane

Government
  - State electorate: Lockyer
  - Federal division: Wright

Area
  - Total: 83.6 km^{2} (32.3 sq mi)

Population
  - Total: 12 (2021 census)
  - Density: 0.144/km^{2} (0.372/sq mi)
- Time zone: UTC+10:00 (AEST)
- Postcode: 4343
Suburbs around Black Duck Creek
Hirstglen; Junction View	East Haldon	East Haldon
Upper Pilton	Black Duck Creek	East Haldon
Upper Pilton	Upper Pilton	Goomburra

Black Duck Creek is a rural locality in the Lockyer Valley Region, Queensland, Australia. In the 2021 census, Black Duck Creek had a population of 12 people.

== Geography ==
Black Duck Creek is a rural area in a north–south valley formed by the creek of the same name.

The locality has the following mountains:

- Cattle Station Peak (27.8313°S 152.1914°E) 600 metres (2,000 ft)
- Mount Hennessy (27.9309°S 152.2658°E) 971 metres (3,186 ft)
- Mount Machar (27.9153°S 152.2441°E) 937 metres (3,074 ft)
- Point Townson (27.8979°S 152.2027°E) 754 metres (2,474 ft)

== History ==
Black Duck Creek State School (also known as Black Duck State School) opened in 1910 on 2 acres (0.81 ha) of land donated by Mr E. J. Easement in 1909 on Black Duck Street Road (approx 27.8311°S 152.1777°E). In 1922, the school buildings were moved to neighbouring Junction View, ready for re-opening as Junction View State School from 18 August 1922. The Black Duck Creek State School site was sold by the Queensland Government in 1985. Junction View State State School was mothballed on 31 December 2008 and closed on 31 December 2010.

== Demographics ==
In the 2016 census, Black Duck Creek had a population of 21 people.

In the 2021 census, Black Duck Creek had a population of 12 people.

== Education ==
There are no schools in Black Duck Creek. The nearest government primary school is Mount Sylvia State School in Mount Sylvia to the north. The nearest government secondary school is Lockyer District State High School in Gatton to the north-east.
