= Glengallan Homestead =

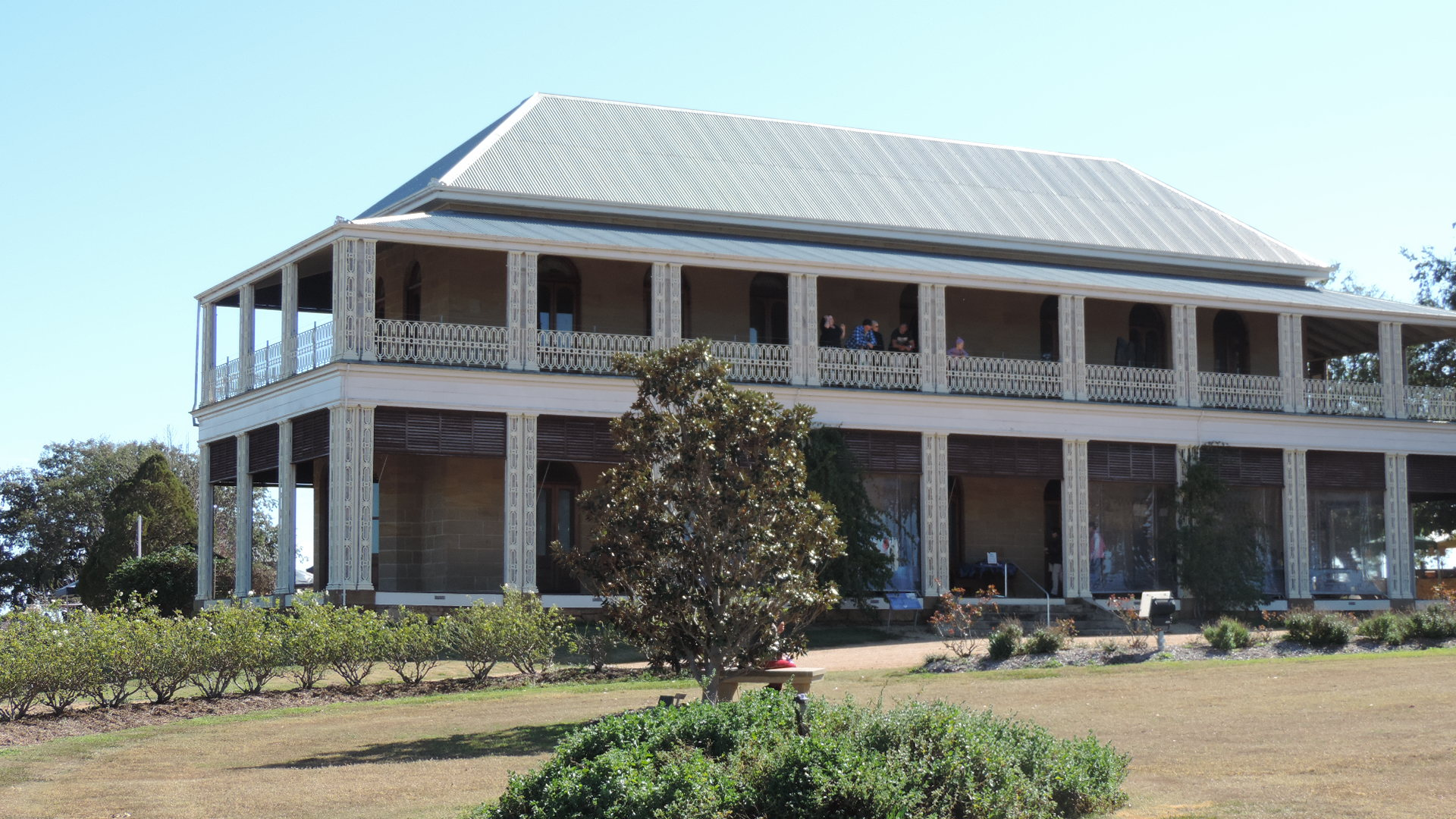
- Glengallan Homestead, 2015

- Location within Queensland Location within Australia
- 28.1024°S 152.0579°E
- Location: New England Highway, Glengallan, Southern Downs Region, Queensland, Australia

History
- Design period: 1840s - 1860s (mid-19th century)
- Built: 1864 - 1904

Site notes
- Website: http://www.glengallan.com.au

Queensland Heritage Register
- Official name: Glengallan Homestead, Glengallan Head Station
- Type: state heritage (built, landscape, archaeological)
- Designated: 21 October 1992
- Reference no.: 600007
- Significant period: 1860s-1910s (historical); 1860s-1910s (fabric)
- Significant components: residential accommodation - main house, cellar, trees/plantings, garden/grounds, tennis court site, store/s / storeroom / storehouse

Glengallan Homestead is a heritage-listed homestead on the New England Highway, Glengallan, Southern Downs Region, Queensland, Australia. It was built from 1864 to 1904. It is also known as Glengallan Head Station. It was added to the Queensland Heritage Register on 21 October 1992 and is open to the public.

== History ==
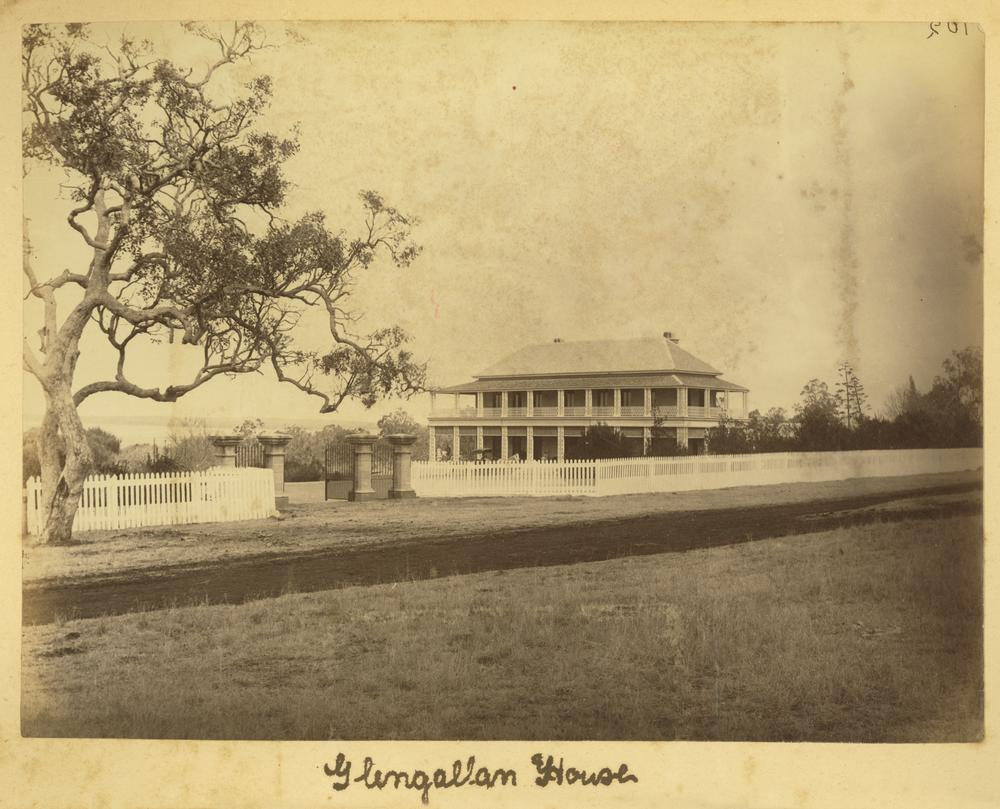
Glengallan Homestead, circa 1875

Glengallan Homestead, built 1867–1868, is located on the southwestern slope of Mount Marshall at the mouth of a wide valley, running west from Cunningham's Gap, near the junction of the Cunningham and New England Highways approximately 15 kilometres (9.3 mi) north of Warwick.

This valley was the original Darling Downs, discovered and named by explorer Allan Cunningham (1791–1839) in 1827 in honour of the Governor of New South Wales, Sir Ralph Darling (1775–1858), and the name Darling Downs was later used to identify the surrounding region of open rolling country with rich and deep soils. Cunningham found a gap in the dividing range, and the following year, while visiting Moreton Bay, he found a gap which he thought was the same one he had discovered previously, and which became known as Cunningham's Gap.

This open country had been carefully and deliberately maintained by the Aboriginal people in what has been called firestick farming, an annual pattern of controlled burns to protect certain resource areas and pasture for native grazing animals. The Aboriginal burning pattern was disrupted within the first years of the runs being taken up, and the local Aboriginal population were soon killed off.

The unsettled districts outside the nineteen counties around Sydney had been thrown open to squatters by the 1836 licence system. This system proved ineffective and in 1839 a new Act was passed. This Act provided for an annual licence fee to be paid, determined per head of stock on the run, and also provided administration by Commissioners of Crown Lands. However, the squatters still had no permanency of land tenure, and in 1847 Orders in Council were introduced which allowed further 14 year leases for established unsettled runs on payment of an annual fee per head of stock. The Orders in Council also gave the run holders the pre-emptive right to purchase the land for its fair value in an unimproved state at less than one pound per acre at the completion of the lease. Pre-emption was allowed to continue until 1868, and meant that nearly all the best land, creek frontages, water holes and portions guarding leasehold areas were pre-empted. It allowed the squatters to hold onto their land, but also plunged many of them into debt often resulting in financial ruin.

Patrick Leslie (1815–1881) born at Warthill, Aberdeenshire, Scotland, the second son of William Leslie, ninth laird of Warthill and eight of Folla, had sailed from London in 1834 and arrived in New South Wales in May 1835. He gained pastoralist experience under the Macarthurs of Camden, and in 1836 went to manage the property of his uncle Davidson on the Krui River at Colleroi. By 1839 Leslie had rented Dunheved farm at Penrith, and when his brothers Walter and George arrived he decided to look for new land north of the limits of settlement. In 1840 he started with a large party for the Clarence River district, and then resolved to look at the Darling Downs. With one companion, a convict named Murphy, he followed Cunningham's trail and relocated the Darling Downs and decided on the area that was to become Toolburra and Canning Downs for his first station. Walter Leslie and Ernest Dalrymple followed with the flocks, and in 1840 the Leslies became the first settlers on the Darling Downs.

Ernest Dalrymple took up a run next to the Leslies, and all runs on the Downs were taken up by June 1841. The Leslies originally selected all the land which became Toolburra, South Toolburra, Glengallan, Gladfield, Maryvale, Warwick and Canning Downs, and had taken up a far greater area than which they were entitled under a New South Wales licence. They had to dispose of the areas that became Glengallan, Sandy Creek, and Fred (Bracker) the German's Creek (Rosenthal) to the Aberdeen Company.

The Leslies negotiated permission to bring supplies from the Moreton Bay settlement, even though it was not open to commerce. The settlement opened in 1842 however, and thereafter all the Downs squatters (run holders) were free to have supplies sent in and wool sent out to Ipswich, from where they could be transported by river to Brisbane.

In 1841–42 the Leslie brothers sold approximately 42,000 acres (17,000 ha) to brothers Colin and John Campbell, Scottish immigrants, who named it Glengallan Run. The Leslies noted they had disposed of the buildings and the right of the lower part of the run for which they had no use and they had received £250 for it. This description may have included Glengallan, Fred the German's Creek and Sandy Creek.

By 1844, Campbell and Co were in liquidation, but the partnership recovered and after 1844 it appears that licences for Glengallan were issued in the sole name of Colin Campbell. Another brother, Archibald, managed the property from 1845–48 and during this time the stock numbers increased considerably, but disease broke out in 1847. Glengallan was offered for sale in November 1847, but this was not successful.

The Campbell's first encampment had been at Freestone Creek, an area which has become known as Campbell Plains, but it proved unsuitable for sheep due to wooded areas and dingo habitat. The camp subsequently moved to Glengallan Creek, known as Gap Creek, near the slope of what became Mt Marshall. It has been suggested that their c.1842 residence, described as a rude but substantial hut, would have been close to the site of the present homestead being close to the creek but above flood level, with expansive views of the surrounding area and a relatively flat terrace of land, but the exact location has not been positively identified. The 1846 diary of the New South Wales Commissioner for Crown Lands, Darling Downs District, stated the run was 120 square miles with 15,000 head of sheep, 400 cattle and 30 horses. In 1848, a NSW Government Gazette noted Colin Campbell holding leases for Glengallan totalling 60,000 acres (24,000 ha). Glengallan was located in a pivotal position on the main roads, which have changed slightly in position, from Toowoomba/Drayton heading towards the south and from the Downs properties heading towards Cunningham's Gap.

The NSW Government Gazette published a list of transfers of runs dated 11 October 1848 recording the transfer of Glengallan from Colin Campbell to the unrelated Robert Tertius Campbell (1811–1887) with whom Colin Campbell banked, and it appears that the three Campbell brothers died in 1853. Robert Tertius Campbell, whose father was a Director of the Bank of New South Wales, was related to the Campbells of Duntroon in the Monaro district, and had been lessee of Jondaryan in 1845, gained the lease of North Branch of Swamps Run in 1849, and continued leasing Canning Creek until 1852. The NSW Government Gazette dated 30 July 1852 recorded that RT Campbell transferred his interest in Glengallan to his partner Charles Henry Marshall, who had previously been his managing clerk and whom he took into partnership in Glengallan it appears in 1849–50. RT Campbell then moved on to the newly opened Burnett District.

In December 1851 and March 1852, the artist Conrad Martens (1801–1878), who had arrived in Sydney in 1835, stayed at Glengallan during the course of his five-month trip to the Brisbane area and the Darling Downs in search of painting commissions. He travelled through the country making pencil drawings, many of which he used as the basis for water colours and oil paintings, which he executed on his return to Sydney. These drawings and paintings are some of the few illustrations of Queensland during this time, and his sketches of Glengallan show the main homestead as two timber buildings surrounded by verandahs and situated close together.

Charles Henry Marshall (1818–1874) was born in Mauritius and had a background in Leith in Scotland and Totnes in Devon, England. He came to Australia in 1842 as Bookkeeper for the Van Diemen's Land Company at Circular Head (Stanley) and was Superintendent of the company's Woolnorth Station at Cape Grim from 1846 to 1849 after which he moved to Queensland. He was appointed Magistrate in 1849–50 and took John Deuchar into partnership in 1855. Marshall was an active member of the Church of England, and in 1858 gave 11 acres (4.5 ha) of land in Warwick to the church as the site for a parsonage and glebe. A parsonage, named Hillside, was built on the site for Reverend Benjamin Glennie. He visited England in 1857 where he married his wife, Charlotte Augusta Dring Drake (daughter of Sir William Henry Drake). The couple returned to Glengallan in early 1858, but left again and returned to England in 1860. Charles travelled to Queensland alone in late 1864 and arranged for Deuchar to buy out his interest. Marshall retired from the partnership and departed for England in April 1865, but was to return to Australia due to Deuchar's financial difficulties in 1870.

During their partnership, Marshall and Deuchar established the famous Glengallan Merino flock and Shorthorn stud.

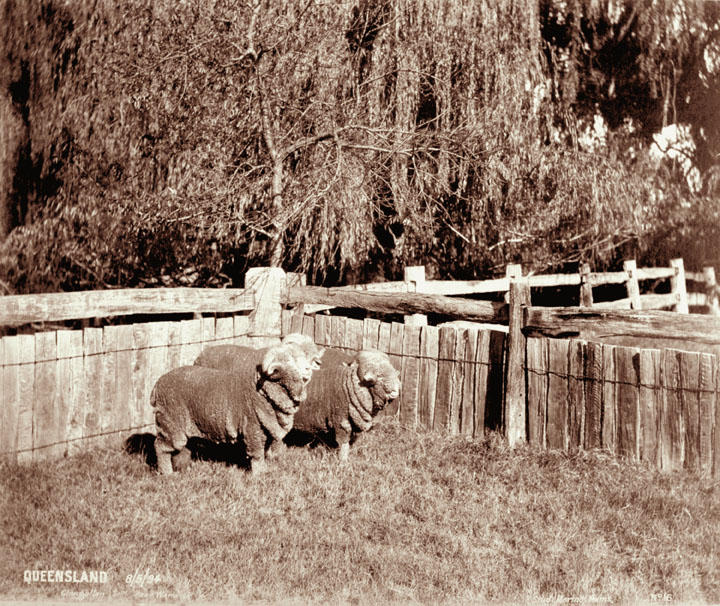
Stud merino rams at Glengallan Station, 1894

John Deuchar (1820–1872) was born in Aberdeen, Scotland, and with his sister Beatrice migrated to New South Wales in 1839. He gained pastoral experience in the Hunter River district and c.1842 drove sheep from Maitland to the Darling Downs for the Aberdeen Co, and later for the North British Australian Co. From 1844 he was overseer at Goomburra, and after two years with the support of Walter Grey of Ipswich, he bought Canal Creek well stocked with Talgai Merinos. In 1848 Deuchar sold Canal Creek, and succeeded Fred Bracker as manager of Rosenthal for the Aberdeen Co, and became travelling superintendent of the company's properties. In 1829 Bracker, from Mecklenburg, Germany, had brought to New South Wales a flock of Saxon Merinos of the Rambouillet family from Prince Esterhazy's Silesian flock for the Aberdeen Co. On Rosenthal, Deuchar had the first two thoroughbred Merino rams on the Darling Downs; Camden Billy from John Macarthur's stud at Camden Park, already there when he took over, and German Billy, which he brought with him from Canal Creek. A fine Merino stud was developed from a blend of Spanish Negretti Cabana and Rambouillet strains, developing long, superfine wool. Deuchar began breeding cattle, especially Shorthorns, and brought to Rosenthal Lord Raglan, the first imported Shorthorn bull to reach the Downs, and well bred cattle from the Australian Agricultural Co's properties farther south. He also developed a horse racing stud, and his stallion Grey Arab, bought from one of the Aberdeen Co's properties, sired many fine horses which Deuchar rode successfully at race meetings both on the flat and over fences.

In 1855 Deuchar went into partnership with Marshall on Glengallan, and continued his stock breeding. His overseer William Anderson had been at school with him and had come to the colony on the same ship. Deuchar insisted on building up his own teams of employees, and on taking over Rosenthal and Glengallan he dispersed the families on the properties and replaced them with other employees already known to him.

In 1857 Deuchar married Eliza Charlotte Lee, the sister of Dr Washington Lee of Warwick, in Paddington Sydney, and travelled to Europe in 1858–60 where he purchased stock which would become important in building up Glengallan's flocks. In Germany Deuchar selected ten rams and ten ewes from the flocks of Baron Von Malzahn at Lenschow in Mecklenburg, of which Marshall made a further selection of ten rams and fifteen ewes in 1862, the last time that outside blood was introduced and the Glengallan Merinos were bred up from this stock.

By 1865 Marshall and Deuchar had pre-empted 18,172 acres (7,354 ha), which rose to 31,166 acres (12,612 ha) by the end of 1867. This was 66% of the total run area which totalled 44,800 acres (18,100 ha), being the highest percentage of pre-empted selection of land of any run in the 1860–1874 period.

By 1864 the Glengallan Head Station complex included two houses, stables and a kitchen, with new stables having been built prior to 1858. In 1866 it was described by Kate Hume, a visitor, as the house has been added to, till it resembles a village, connected by verandahs and covered ways!

Glengallan Homestead was constructed in 1867–68, and it is thought that Deuchar had been planning his house for some time. The extant office/store building with cellar was constructed in 1864 by local builder Donald Meiklejohn from local sandstone, and is thought to be both experimental and an integral part of the total envisaged precinct. A variety of sizes of sandstone block was used, unlike the regular masonry of the house or the irregular stonework of the verandah foundation. It has been suggested that the cellar was experimental in determining the movement and depth of the black soil, and that subsequently cellars were not chosen for the main house. It appears that the cellar was a cold store, and that the dry goods store was above, with the estate office.

Deuchar had intended to build a much larger house, possibly in a U-shape plan, although he only had time and resources to build one wing of Glengallan Homestead. Unconfirmed reports state that a massive hole was dug for the foundations, up to 20 feet (6.1 m) wider than the building, till sandstone was reached. On this sandstone a massive platform of basalt rubble was laid, and the outer and dividing walls were then constructed and the intervening spaces refilled to ground level. During construction the Warwick Examiner and Times noted in November 1867 that Glengallan will be one of the most splendid gentlemen's residences in the colony.

The sandstone for Glengallan Homestead was quarried on the property, from an area near Swan Creek at Yangan, and the verandah sandstone, much coarser and softer, comes from Karcaruda, which was a former settlement and railway siding near Swan Creek.

The construction of Glengallan was supervised by Warwick builder Thomas Wood, possibly for architect Charles Balding who, based in Ipswich, had opened a temporary office in Toowoomba and his practice extended to the Darling Downs. Balding had designed Gooloowan in Quarry Street, Ipswich, for Benjamin Cribb, which was built in 1863–64 and is noted as being similar to Glengallan. It has also been suggested that Richard George Suter (1827–1894) may have been involved, possibly taking over from Balding who left the colony in 1867. Suter later designed Jimbour House, a two-storeyed sandstone homestead built 1873–74.

Deuchar had two suites of furniture made at Ebenstons in Queen Street, Brisbane, for the drawing and dining rooms. The fact that local materials and a local manufacturer were used was publicised in the Brisbane Courier in August 1868. Reports of the cost of the house vary between £5-12,000, and a gala opening party was held on 16 September 1868. The Deuchars hosted many social events during their time at Glengallan, and house guests included Governor Bowen and his family. Deuchar had envisaged the ground floor rooms as drawing room (north) and ball room (south), but were actually used as drawing room (south) and dining room (north) with bedrooms on the first floor.

Nine months after the opening party, Glengallan was offered for sale. The cost of the pre-emptive purchase, building a grand house, a drought, and buying Marshall out of the partnership all contributed to Deuchar's financial ruin. In early 1865 Deuchar had taken over sole control of the management of Glengallan, and contracted to buy the property by taking out a mortgage with Marshall payable in ten years.

Deuchar was unable to pay instalments on the mortgage and in early 1869 Marshall agreed to Deuchar raising finance elsewhere and paying him out. This did not occur and Deuchar, who also had significant other debts, sought to sell Glengallan starting in May 1869. Brewster and Trebeck sought to auction the property on 7 July 1869, deferred this to 21 July, but failed to attract a satisfactory bid. The beginning of the end came in August when the Bank of Australasia started legal proceedings in the Queensland Supreme Court against Deuchar for the payment of an outstanding overdraft. Another sale of Glengallan was proposed for 2 February 1870, but this did not go ahead because Deuchar was declared bankrupt on that date. At a final hearing in April 1870 Deuchar's proven debts were £97,000 with £80,329 owed to Marshall and £15,859 to bankers. The valuation of Glengallan, including all its stock, property and chattels, was £80,000 so Marshall exercised his pre-emptive, and secured, rights as mortgagee and took possession of Glengallan. This included the Deuchar silver plate (much of which had been paid for by Charles in England) and other contents of the household, except the furniture. The furniture, excluding the Dining Table for some reason, was deemed part of the insolvent estate and was sold for £250, which made up a major portion of the final settlement to unsecured creditors of £327–4½d in the £. The furniture remained at Glengallan which suggests the purchaser was probably Charles Marshall.

Deuchar retired to Mile End in Warwick where he died of pneumonia aged 50 on 11 September 1872, survived by his wife, two daughters and six sons.

During Deuchar's occupation, the servants quarters and buggy shed were built, and the gardens and avenue of trees were laid out. The house water supply and sewerage disposal system was also developed, with the water being pumped from the creek using a 2.5 horse-power Bailey engine, and the pump appears to have been set on a sandstone block platform. The water was pumped to a holding tank below the bathroom, then up to a 200-gallon lead lined wooden roof tank supplying cold water for bath, shower and flushing toilet on the first floor. The large size of the roof tank was probably due to the type of toilet system used, a rare feature at the time, which had been invented in 1778 and required high water pressure. The pump was also used to irrigate the gardens around the house.

During the next 20 years, the two early houses were demolished, and the covered way to one of the houses was truncated. A rear wing, known as the cedar wing, was built to provide guest rooms, estate office, cook's bedroom and housekeeper's room. The kitchen was built adjoining the side of the covered way, but separate from the stone house, and was set on stumps with a large chimney at its eastern end. The bath house was built against the western end of the south verandah.

Marshall returned in November 1870 and remained until 1873 when he took William Ball Slade into partnership and again retired to England where he died in August 1874. The partnership continued however, with Marshall's share transferred to his widow, Charlotte Augusta Dring Marshall, until 1904 when the property was sold. Charlotte asked Slade to return the Deuchar silver plate to Eliza Deuchar in 1877.

A new woolshed was completed to the northeast of the house in 1873, being approximately three times the size of the present woolshed. The earliest position of the woolshed is noted in 1859–60. The 1873 woolshed is noted as having a T-shape plan and could accommodate 22 shearers, and was described in 1892 as being a hardwood structure, with a shingle roof, that could accommodate 1,000 sheep. The exact position of the washpool has been disputed, but some sources indicate that it was located upstream from the house. Clean wool was abandoned in favour of greasy wool with the cessation of sheep washing in the 1870s.

During WB Slade's time at Glengallan, many changes occurred resulting from the increased diversification of the property into dairying and crops. In the open areas fostered by the Aboriginal land management practices, prior to European settlement, a pasture dominated by nutritious grasses had developed. These grasses did not survive intensified stocking, particularly when fencing became a standard practice, and less nutritious grasses took their place. A gradual decline in the carrying capacity was noted during the period 1860–1880, and the solution was to improve the feed and as a result lucerne became a major crop.

From 1842 to 1868 any cultivation was limited to paddocks lower than the house and closer to the creek. After 1868, Deuchar's pump, installed to deliver water to the house, was used to irrigate nearby fields. After 1880, the benefit of lucerne as a fodder crop was recognised and the cultivation of wheat and other grains began to assume importance. For the following 80 to 90 years, many of the paddocks above and near the house were cultivated for crops, and much soil was washed away.

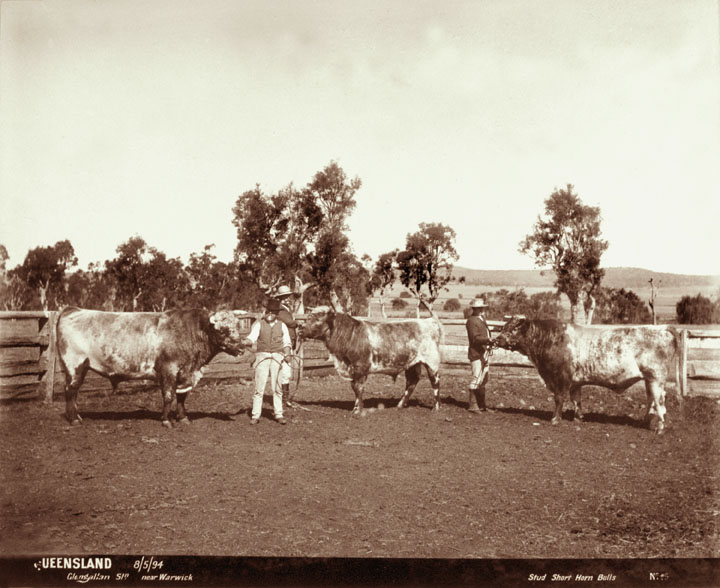
Stud short horn bulls at Glengallan Station, 1894

William Ball Slade (1843–1938) was born in Somerset, England, and after some legal training migrated to Sydney in 1861 where his elder brother was practising as a solicitor. After pastoral experience in New South Wales and Queensland, Slade married Sophia Thompson on 1 March 1873 at St Mark's Church of England Warwick, and that year became manager and partner of Glengallan. Deuchar had established notable Shorthorn and Merino studs, and between the droughts of 1872 and 1902 Slade developed the Shorthorn stud to over one thousand pedigree females, one of the largest in the world. The Merino stud had such prestige that Slade maintained a closed flock until 1916. During that time he developed a heavier-fleeced flock, with wool that was stronger, of greater length and often brighter. He kept another line of Merinos of Vermont strain, separate from the Glengallan foundation stock, and also bred Lincolns. He exported stud Merinos to the Cape of Good Hope in 1888, a connection which was long continued.

Many more staff were required at Glengallan, even though shepherding was abandoned in favour of fenced paddocks, and sheep washing ceased in the 1870s. Glengallan concentrated on stud sheep and cattle, with fat lambs becoming important once rail transport and refrigeration came into the economic realm. One of Slade's achievements was to transform Glengallan from a traditional pastoral stud property to one where intensive cultivation of lucerne and other fodder supported not only the stud stock but also wethers bought for fattening from western properties, and he was praised by contemporaries as the best manager in the Darling Downs. Further diversification included dairying and a substantial piggery.

At some point it appears that the main flow of Glengallan Creek became diverted down Backwater Creek, for what reason is not known. By 1892 three dams had been constructed on Glengallan Creek to provide irrigation to the paddocks. Water was still being pumped from the creek in the 1890s, but by the early 1900s water was being supplied by a bore on the northwest of Mt Marshall to a holding tank near the woolshed, and the house water system was reliant on rain water. The original timber shingles to the roof of Glengallan were sheeted over with corrugated iron and stormwater drainage was introduced. Pipes were installed at both the northwest and southwest corners of the house, with the northwest pipe feeding into the stone lined channel that runs along the west side of house with sandstone capping pieces. Pipes also fed into the roof tank.

In 1885 Glengallan covered 42,000 acres (17,000 ha), and from 1896 to 1904 Glengallan was progressively broken up into smaller units. After the original leases had expired in the 1860s, lease holders were permitted to acquire large areas by pre-emptive claim and further purchases. Considerable pressures were put upon the pastoralists due to demand for smaller land holdings, eventually resulting in the Selection Acts of the 1860s and 1870s which forced them to borrow heavily, and the fluctuation of wool prices meant that it was difficult for them to make a profit. The Agricultural Lands Purchase Act of 1894 was the instrument by which many of the large estates on the Downs were broken up. Under this Act, the Glengallan partnership restored its capital and recouped drought losses in three major subdivisions between 1895 and 1904, when the partnership came to an end. Slade actively offered his property to the Government and lobbied local Members of Parliament to assist in ensuring his offer was accepted.

In 1904, after the three major subdivisions, Slade retained 3,000 acres (1,200 ha) and repurchased the Glengallan Homestead block, reportedly between 1,275 and 2,000 acres (810 ha) in size, from the Government for £10,265. Later in 1904, Slade transferred the Glengallan Homestead and accompanying 482 acres (195 ha) to GH Gillespie, a member of the well known firm of Victorian Millers. It appears that by 1907, Clara Gillespie was farming the Glengallan Homestead portion with her son Alexander Frederick Gillespie.

Slade named his smaller estate East Glengallan, built himself a residence and continued with the Glengallan Merino and Shorthorn studs. Slade acquired properties near Warwick and at Gore, towards Inglewood, for his family. In 1912 East Glengallan was subdivided with the eldest son Oswald Carey Slade (1882–1956) managing the Merino stud. Slade's other son Adrian also managed or was proprietor of award-winning studs.

WB Slade is celebrated as the archetypal Anglo-Australian patrician of Warwick, and was patron, office-bearer and benefactor of show societies, his church, Masonic Lodge and the Warwick branch of the Royal Society of St George. His great avocation was cricket, and he donated Slade Park to the Queensland I Zingari Cricket Club, which formed 1868 and of which he was one of the first members and Captain for almost 30 years. He established annual cricket matches at Glengallan and a pavilion was constructed. In 1932 he was appointed CBE, and he died 18 April 1938 and is buried in the Warwick cemetery. His name is remembered by the Slade School, Warwick.

Slade established a school, which had opened by 1886, and paid for its construction, desks, furniture and teacher. It was taken over by the Education Department in 1891, and was closed and relocated in 1904 when that portion of Glengallan was purchased by the government. Slade also gave 2 acres (0.81 ha) to the Anglican Church, and St Andrew's Church was opened in 1908. St Andrew's was described as a weatherboard church that could accommodate 200 people, painted dark red with pale green glass casement windows and a vestry at the western end. The church has since been relocated to St David's, Allora, and is attached to the hall.

The only alteration made to Glengallan Homestead by Slade is thought to be the timber partition in the first floor northern room to accommodate children's bedrooms.

By 1904 the structures at the head station consisted of Glengallan Homestead, with the rear cedar wing, kitchen and bath house attached, sandstone office/store, two storeyed stables, buggy shed, and servants quarters. The garden comprised a tennis court (often used for cricket practice) to the northeast of the house, a gravel/cobbled semi- circular drive lined by semi-circular garden beds and an extensive shrubbery, a lawn with a central circular garden, a tree lined drive (planted by Deuchar), and a box hedge separating the formal garden from the productive gardens. An orchard was located on the southern side of the house and was terraced down to Glengallan Creek which was fringed with willows. A vegetable garden was also located on the southern side or behind the house. Glengallan was described as giving the appearance of a picturesquely scattered township, and included many outbuildings and a large complex of structures nearer to the woolshed.

Clara Gillespie was declared insolvent in July 1910, and it appears that the property was transferred to her son Alexander Frederick Gillespie in January 1912. It is noted that financial problems plagued AF Gillespie, and during his occupation of the property there appears to have been no new buildings erected and some may have begun to deteriorate. It appears that the Glengallan Homestead portion was transferred to Oswald Carey Slade (son of WB Slade) in July 1918, and AF Gillespie died in 1926–27.

Oswald Carey Slade installed a manager, and it is recorded that the Atkinson family lived in the main house in 1927. Another manager and his family occupied the house from 1931 until he retired due to ill health in 1944–45. This was the last family to live at the house. During OC Slade's ownership, the property further deteriorated with the area between the house and the office/store turned into a farmyard.

In 1919, Glengallan was described as being approached via a winding drive over a quarter mile long, with magnificent pine trees lining either side of the drive, a neat picket fence of 270 yards (250 m) surrounds the garden area, broken by a substantial gateway of stone pillars and iron gates. It was also described as having cobbled areas to the north side of the house and approaching the office/store doors, a fernery, small vineyard, homestead enclosure and adjacent small paddocks irrigated by pipes which were supplied by elevated tanks filled by a pump, stables with feed room and harness room, buggy shed for three vehicles, and a couple of six-room cottages for married men and their families. By this time, much of the infrastructure which originally supported Glengallan would have been disused or much modified.

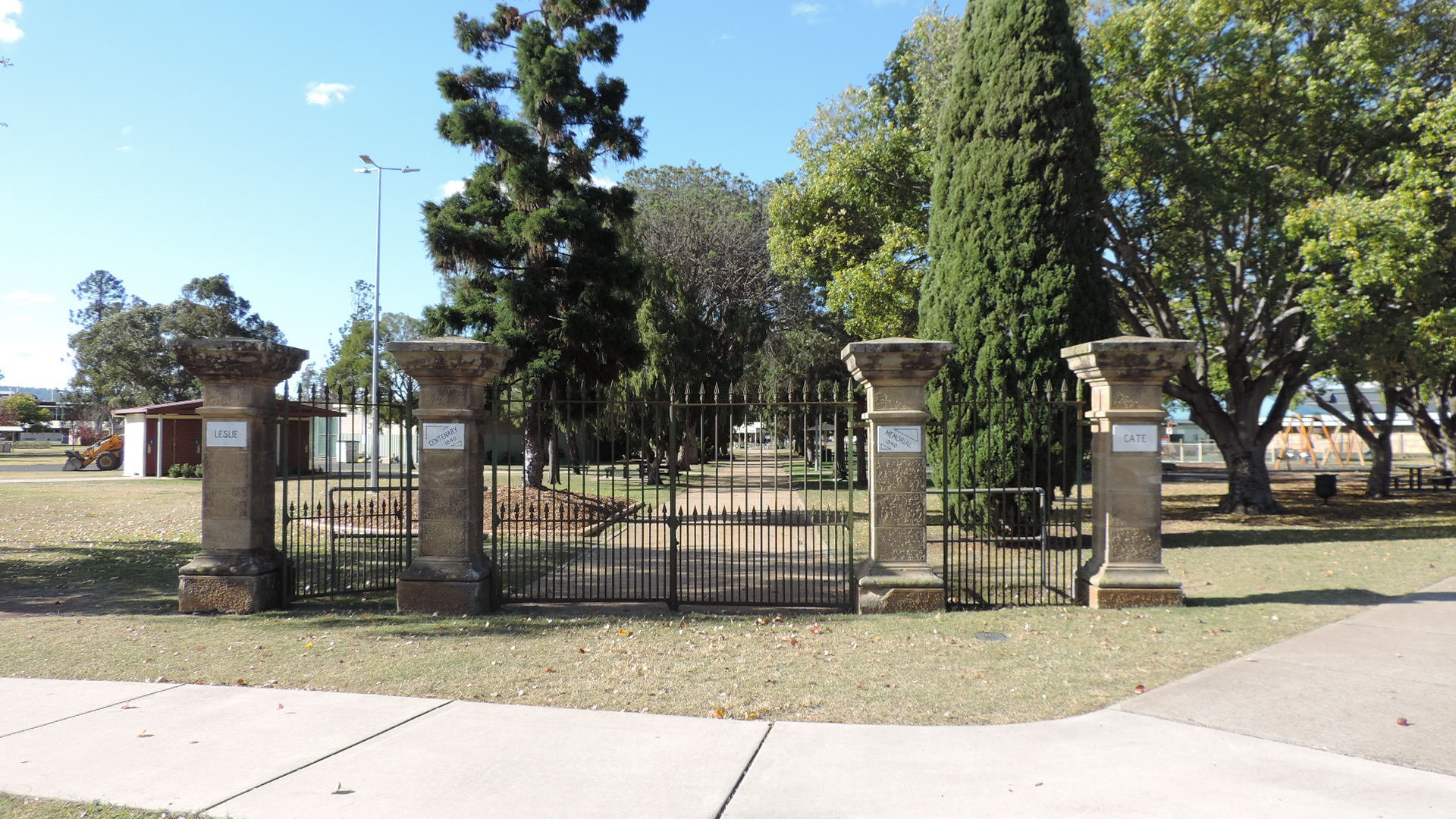
Leslie centenary memorial gates, 2015

The two-storeyed stables burned down, probably in the late 1920s, and a stone paved and corrugated iron roofed shed was erected partly over the site. This was possibly also the site of the earlier stables as sketched by Conrad Martens in 1852, which were also possibly built on the site of the c.1842 stables. In the early 1930s the first floor of Glengallan House was unoccupied and the servants quarters, a long narrow timber building comprising rooms opening onto a verandah, was demolished. The stone pillars and iron gates were removed in 1940 to Leslie Park in Warwick where they were re-used to commemorate the centenary of the arrival of the Leslie brothers and the establishment of Canning Downs. In 1946 the kitchen and bath house were removed to other parts of the property, and later that year the cedar wing was dismantled and sold to Eddie Mogridge of Tannymorel, and it has subsequently been moved to Swanfels. The remains of a cemetery is located at a distance from Glengallan House to the southwest, but the date of establishment is not known.

Oswald Carey Slade was childless, and in 1931 he transferred East Glengallan to the Anglican Church, subject to a life tenancy.

In 1949 Mr and Mrs OC Slade gave Glengallan Homestead to the Anglican Church. The Anglican Church had plans to dismantle Glengallan and use the materials to build a War Memorial Science Block at the Slade School in Warwick, but this did not eventuate. The school leased the property to various people for farming purposes.

After the property was accepted by the Anglican Church, no development was seriously attempted. Glengallan Homestead was left often open and used as shelter by goats and birds, and many of the fittings were removed. In 1972 the property was transferred to the Smith family. Glengallan was left unoccupied, its remaining gardens were turned into paddocks, and the slow creep of soil from cultivated paddocks above was allowed to continue. The only visible structures were the main house and the sandstone office/store.

A 1975 report noted that the structure was in reasonably good condition, some sheets of corrugated iron had blown off the roof and the verandahs had deteriorated. By 1983 the southern verandah had collapsed and the eastern verandah was unstable, water was entering the building and more corrugated iron sheets were missing.

In 1983, a group of fourth year architecture students from the University of Queensland made a set of measured drawings of Glengallan House. These were followed up by a conservation analysis funded by a National Estate Grant in 1983, 1984 and 1986, carried out by the Department of Architecture University of Queensland. Recommendations for the conservation and management of Glengallan were made, but no organisation was willing to undertake them. In 1993 Glengallan House and its surrounding grounds were gifted to the non-profit Glengallan Homestead Trust which was formed in 1993.

Since then archaeological excavations have been carried out, mainly involving the drainage, water and sewerage systems. However, works have also been carried out resulting in some damage to the property. These works include the removal of black soil overburden, the provision of water, power and telephone, the installation of a toilet block and septic system, excavation for rebuilding of verandah walls, the construction of a shed, and the verandahs have been largely removed. The roof has been repaired, with some new structural members being inserted, and resheeted with corrugated iron with some of the original timber shingles being retained in situ.

Glengallan Homestead is open to the public for viewing.

== Description ==
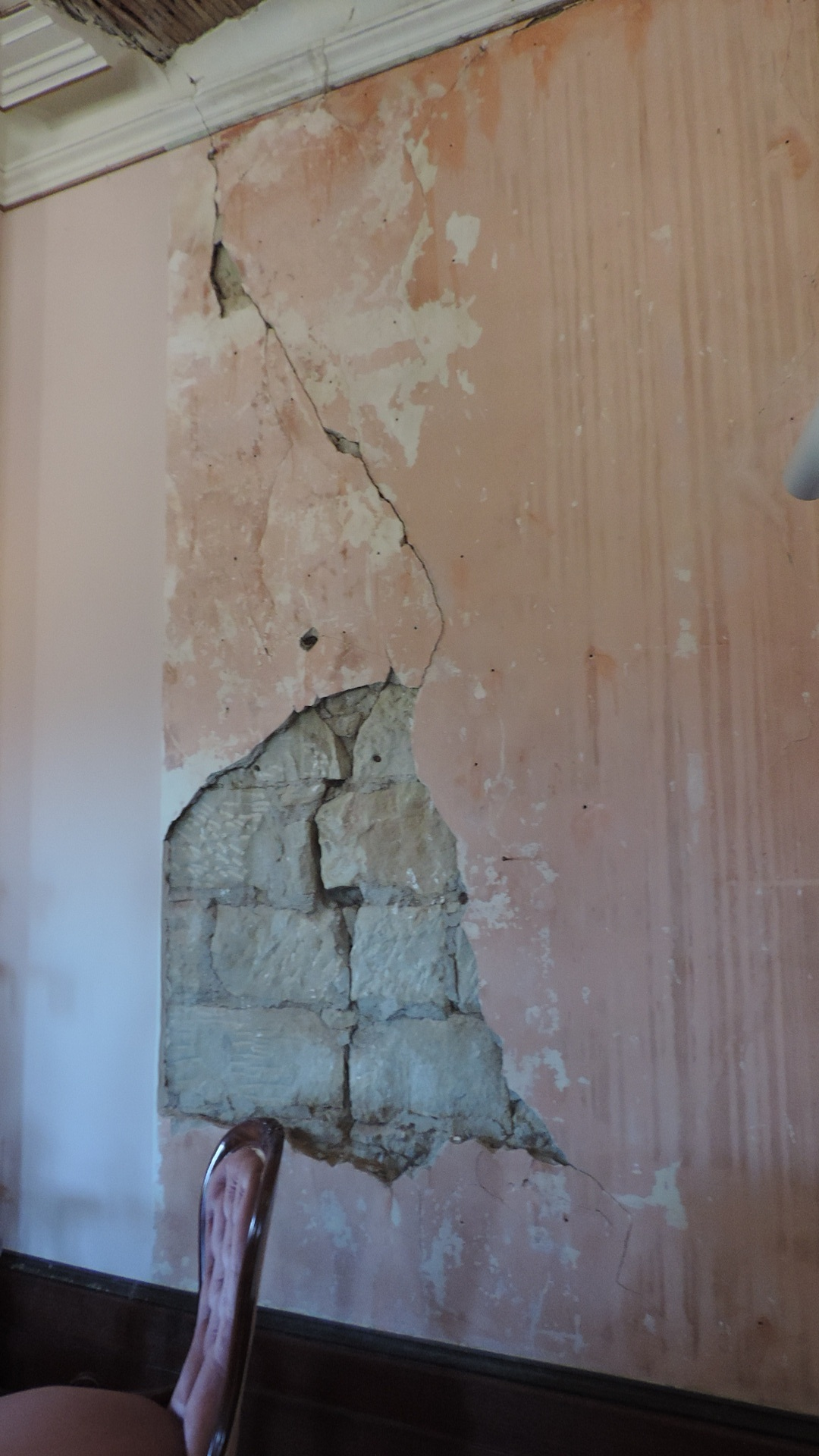
Wall showing ruinous state before conservation, 2015

Glengallan Homestead is located on the southwestern slope of Mount Marshall at the mouth of a wide valley, running west from Cunningham's Gap, near the junction of the Cunningham and New England Highways approximately 15 kilometres (9.3 mi) north of Warwick. The fenced area of land on which the homestead is located is accessed via an easement from the New England Highway to the southwest. The homestead has been in a ruinous condition but is undergoing conservation works.

The homestead is a long, narrow two-storeyed ashlar sandstone structure, built on an approximately north-south axis, with a hipped corrugated iron roof. The symmetrical principal elevation faces in an easterly direction overlooking the valley and towards Mount Dumaresq in the distance, which it resembles in silhouette. The rear elevation has projecting sandstone blocks on the north and south ends, indicating the intended two-storeyed extensions which were never built and which would have formed a U-shaped plan. The building originally had a timber shingled roof, and some of these shingles remain under the corrugated iron sheeting.

The building has the remains of double height verandahs to the north, east and south. The most intact section of verandah is located at the northern end, with the southern end almost completely missing. The ground floor verandahs have paired, narrow ornamental cast iron columns, which were produced by the Russell Foundry of Sydney, in front and to either side of a tubular cast iron column which was intended to support the load above. These columns are currently in place only to the northern end and part of the western side, and are supported by sandstone plinths which in turn are supported by a footing wall. The paired Russell Foundry columns were also located on the first floor verandah where they acted as structural members. The inside face of the columns had timber panelling which, to the ground floor verandah, aligned with expressed false beams in the timber panelled ceiling. The ground floor columns support a timber web truss, which in turn supports the first floor verandah above. The first floor verandah had cast iron balustrades, also produced by the Russell Foundry, which have been removed.

The ground floor verandahs originally had a fixed timber louvred panelled frieze, which was the remnants of a louvred system intended to have panels which ran in tracks located at the side of the columns allowing the verandah to be enclosed, but where venetian blinds were installed instead. The ground floor verandahs had timber floors which have been removed, and a central set of sandstone steps accessing the main entrance on the eastern side.

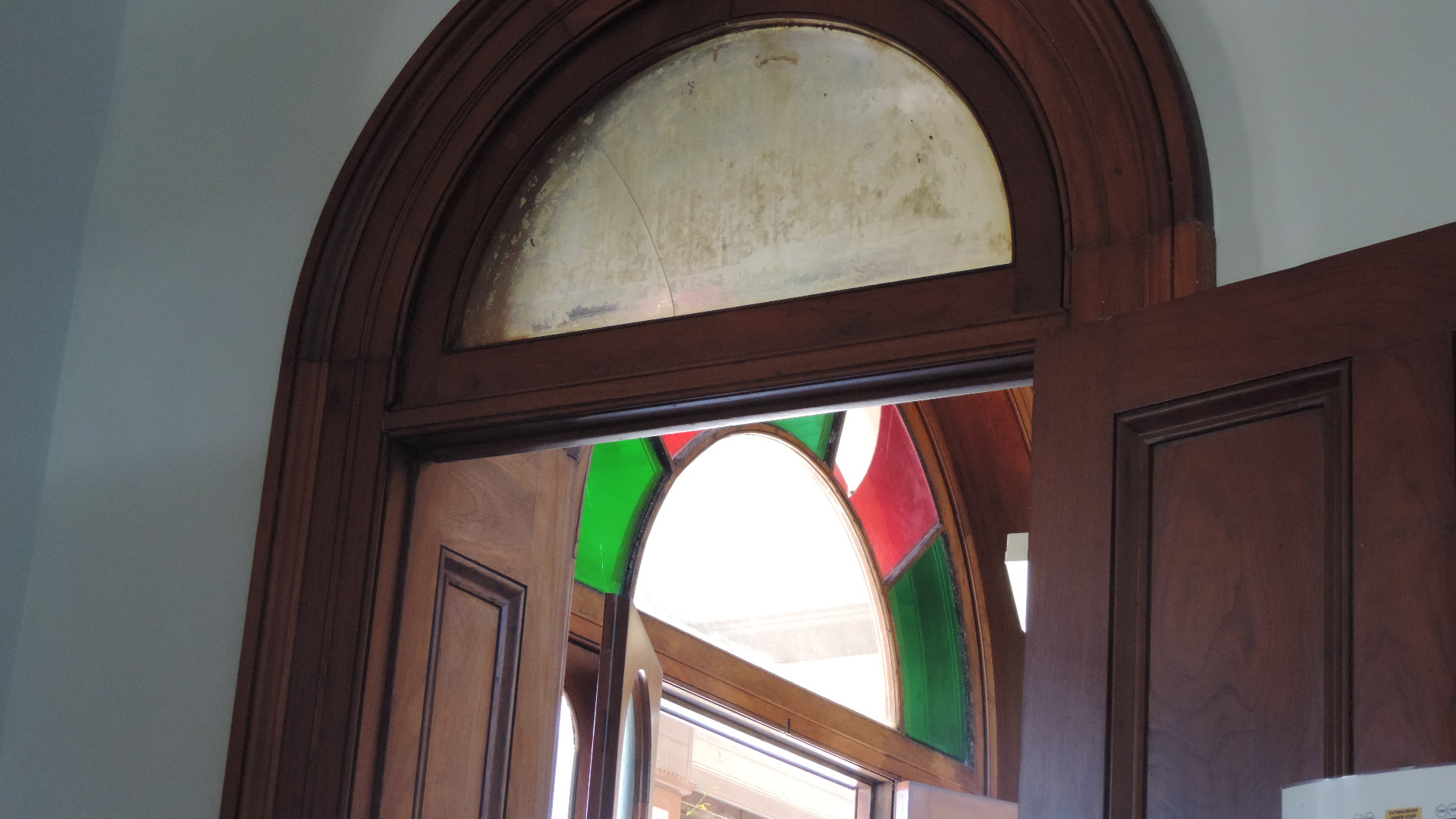
Fanlights, 2015

The east and south walls have smooth faced sandstone blocks, while the north and west walls have picked faced sandstone. Both floors have French doors with arched fanlights opening onto the verandahs, with three sets of doors either side of the central entry, and all arched headers have expressed vermiculated keystones. The central entry has double doors with sidelights, and an arched fanlight with coloured glass segments surmounted by an expressed keystone carved in relief with the initials JD 1867 surrounded by a garland of leaves. The doors and sidelights have timber lower panels with etched, arched glazed upper panels. The French doors are similar and open inwards. Originally these doors had a second set of doors which opened outwards and contained a timber lower panel with an upper panel of copper mesh, presumably as an insect screen. The ground floor north and south elevations have a projecting sandstone bay with a central French door flanked by a tall, narrow sash window.

The ground floor western wall has timber panelled doors with arched fanlight at the north and south ends. A similar doorway is located in the centre under the internal staircase, but the door is missing. These doors are accessed by rough sandstone steps and a timber ramp, and a stone lined stormwater drain is located in front of and running parallel to this wall. A tall sash window is located above the central door, with a smaller sash to either side. This symmetrical elevation has two chimney stacks which have picked-faced sandstone to the base, and smooth-faced sandstone above surmounted by a large cornice with curved capping pieces. The western wall has marks in the sandstone above the northern door which indicate the roof profile of the covered way which was originally located connected there.

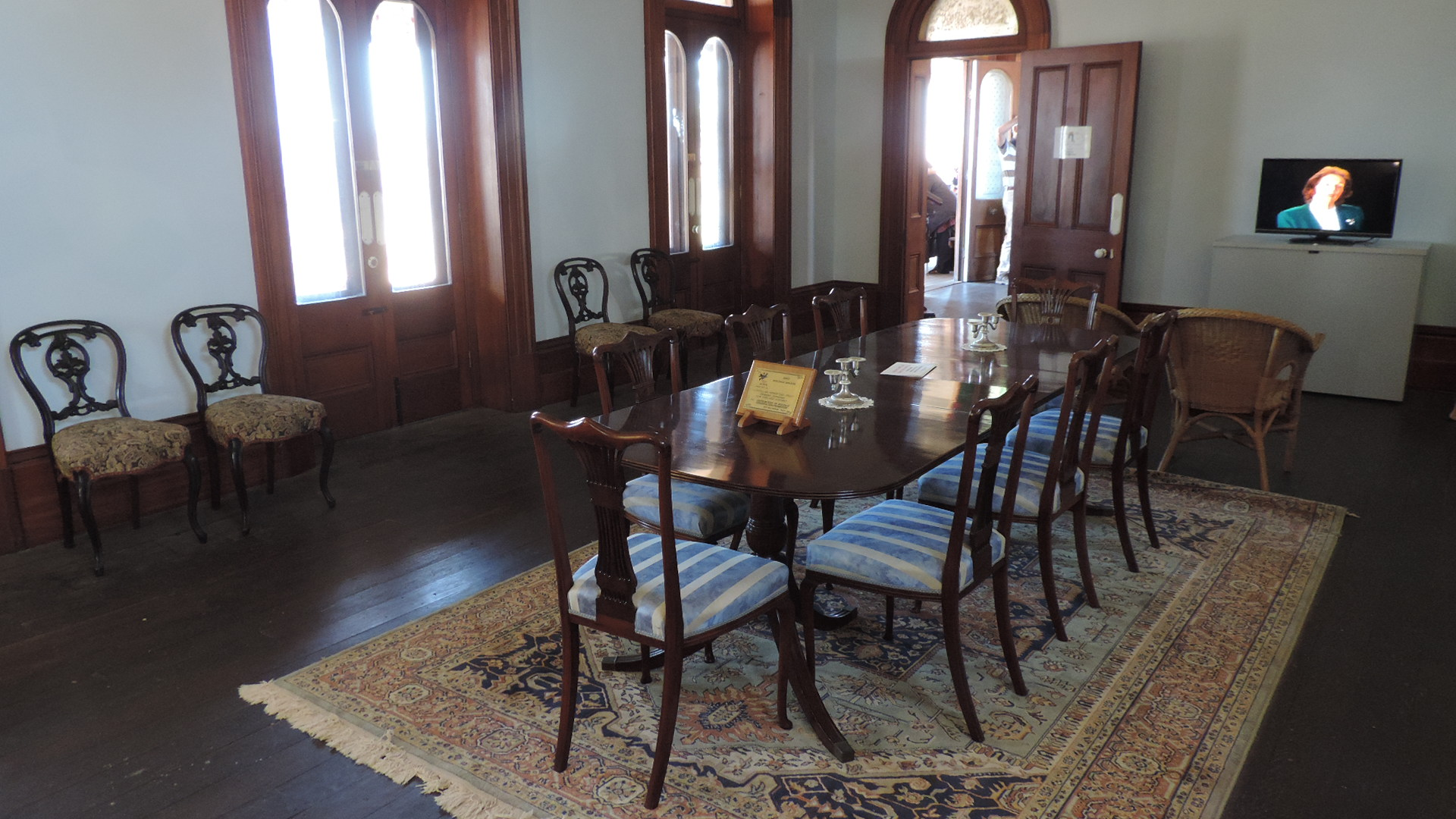
Dining room, 2015

Internally, the building has a symmetrical plan with a central hall and stairwell flanked by the former dining room on the north and former drawing room on the south. The first floor has a bedroom at either end, separated from the stairwell by an ante room and linked by a short hallway. The plaster finishes are thought to be original, but have suffered much water damage.

All the masonry walls are plastered, and on the first floor the non-masonry walls are lath and plaster. The ceilings are lath and plaster, and all rooms have plaster cornices, with the widths and designs varying in different rooms. Principal rooms have ornate central plaster ceiling roses, with the dining room containing two roses which would have been positioned above a central table. Throughout the building, the skirtings, architraves, doors and floor boards are cedar. Doors are panelled with etched, arched glass fanlights, and evidence of early decoration include brackets for curtain rods.

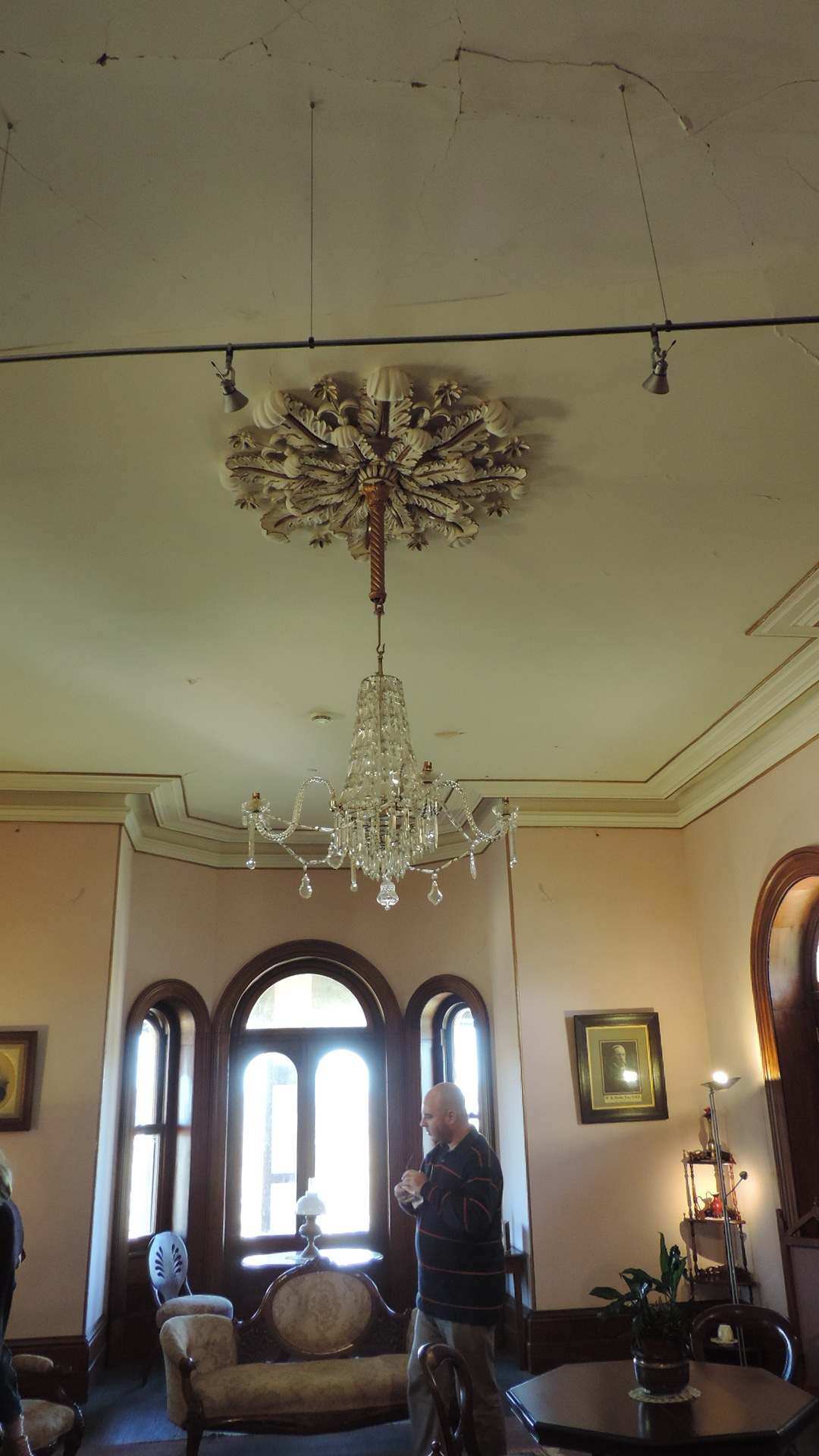
Drawing room, 2015

The drawing room originally had a white marble fireplace surround with relief carving of fruit, and the dining room had a black marble fireplace surround, both of which have been removed. The main bedroom, on the south, has a cedar fireplace surround and evidence of a shelving unit which was located between the chimney breast and adjacent wall but was probably not an original fitting. The adjacent ante-room housed a bathroom, and surviving evidence include vertically jointed timber panelling and a cedar surround for a shower rose. The bathroom originally housed a slate bath and flushing toilet. The northern bedroom has a vertically jointed timber partition wall which divides the room in two but which does not reach the ceiling height. This room had a cedar fireplace surround which has been removed, but the register grate is in place. The adjacent ante-room is thought to have been a nursery or dressing room.

The stairwell contains a U-shaped curving cedar staircase which has been partly restored. A protective timber cover and temporary handrail has been installed, with the original turned cedar balustrade and handrail in place to the first floor landing. The stair is lit by a tall sash window.

To the west of the homestead is the office/store. This single-storeyed sandstone building has a hipped corrugated iron roof, which originally had timber shingles, and a cellar. The stonework consists of a rough alternation of thick and thin bands, and the northern elevation has a central entrance flanked by a window to either side. A second entrance is located on the eastern side facing the homestead, two windows are located on the southern side, and the cellar is entered from the west via a flight of seven sandstone steps, but the original entrance door has been removed. The building has air vents to the cellar just above ground level. Internally, this building originally had two rooms with separate entries, but the internal wall has been removed. The walls are plastered and a ceiling has been installed. Remains of cobbled paths around the building are evident.

Cultivation of the paddocks above the homestead has resulted in the site being mantled in 300 millimetres (12 in) of black soil. Some of this overburden has been removed, but the majority of the site has been protected and the position of early structures may be able to be identified with further investigation. Excavations have been undertaken to the site of the cedar wing and kitchen complex, stables, stormwater drains and sewerage system, and to a large part of the area north and west of the office. The site boundary fence passes across the corner of the partly excavated area of the stables.

The remains of the gardens include two bunya pines which mark the position of the original entrance gates and stone pillars to the northeast of the homestead. The form of the raised tennis court and curved drive can be determined, and a number of mature trees are located at the northern end of the homestead. Remains of the orchard, to the south of the homestead, include a number of gnarled and twisted fruit trees.

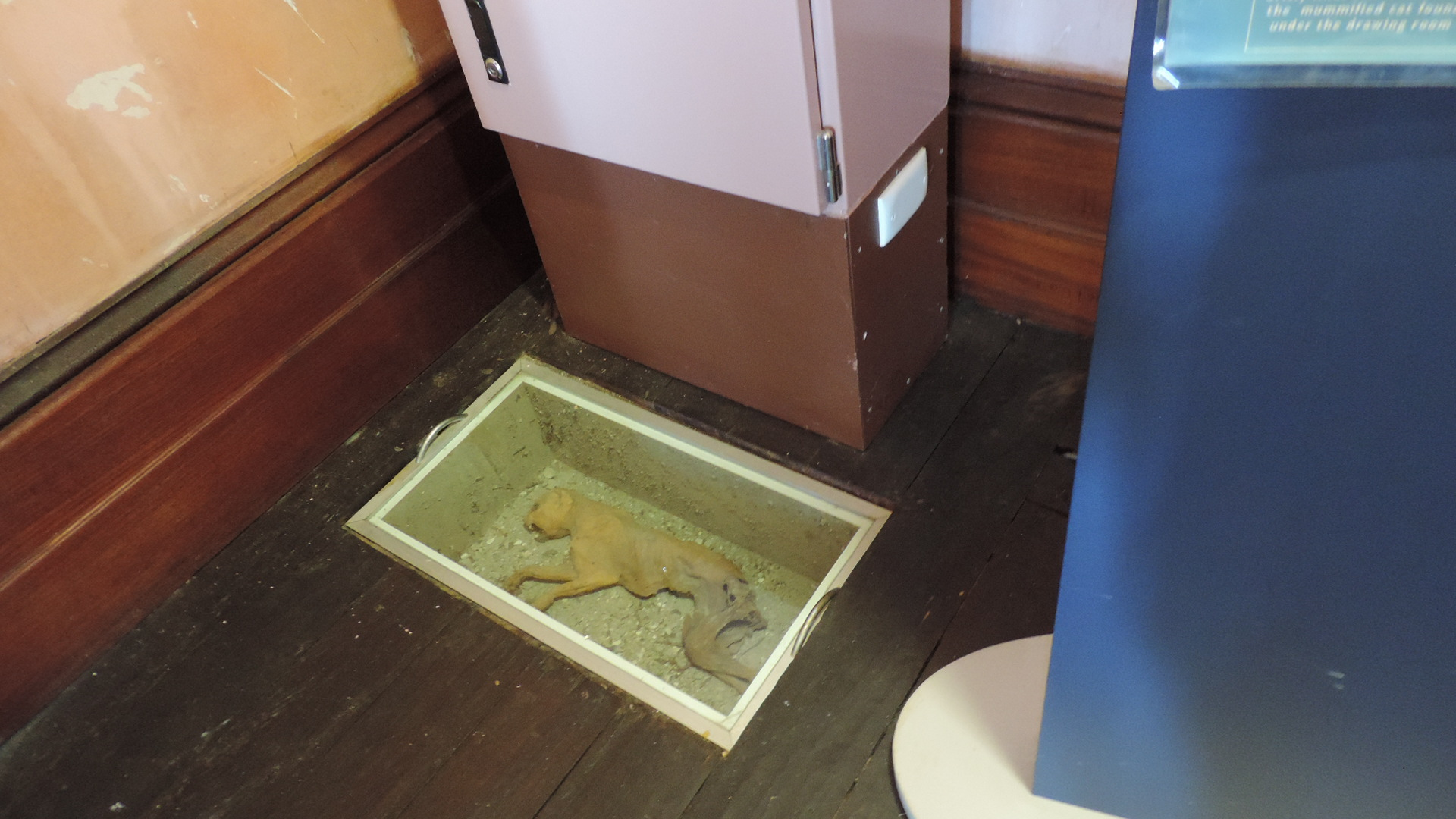
Mummified cat, 2015

An unexpected discovery during conservation works was the remains of a mummified cat underneath the floorboards. It is not known if the cat was accidentally entombed there or whether it was linked to medieval practice to ward off evil spirits, possibly linked to building trade guilds.

== Heritage listing ==
Glengallan Homestead was listed on the Queensland Heritage Register on 21 October 1992 having satisfied the following criteria.

The place is important in demonstrating the evolution or pattern of Queensland's history.

The district surrounding Glengallan Homestead was part of the area Allan Cunningham discovered and explored in 1827. The Glengallan Run was part of the first Darling Downs run, selected by Patrick Leslie in 1840, and was established and named by brothers Colin and John Campbell in 1841–42. The approximate site of the present homestead appears to have been established c.1842, and since that time has been located in a pivotal position on the main roads, which have changed slightly in position, from Toowoomba/Drayton heading towards the south and from the Downs properties heading towards Cunningham's Gap.

The homestead was built in 1867–68 by John Deuchar who, with partner Charles Henry Marshall, established the famous Glengallan Merino flock and Shorthorn stud. The breeding tradition established by Deuchar was further developed by William Ball Slade who maintained the pre-eminence of the Glengallan stud from 1873 until the property was sold in 1904. Slade also transformed Glengallan from a traditional pastoral stud property to one where intensive cultivation of lucerne and other fodder supported not only the stud stock but also wethers bought for fattening from western properties. Further diversification included dairying and a substantial piggery, and Slade was praised by his contemporaries as the best manager on the Darling Downs. Slade was also described as the archetypal Anglo-Australian patrician of Warwick, being a patron, office-bearer, benefactor and member of numerous societies, clubs, the Masonic Lodge and Anglican Church.

The place demonstrates rare, uncommon or endangered aspects of Queensland's cultural heritage.

Glengallan Homestead is a two-storeyed sandstone structure and as such, with the exception of Jimbour House, is a rare example of a Queensland homestead of that period which were mainly single-storeyed timber structures. Although the homestead was built as part of a larger, uncompleted design, the grand architectural concept can be appreciated and, with its picturesque siting, the building is recognised as a landmark in the surrounding rural landscape.

The place has potential to yield information that will contribute to an understanding of Queensland's history.

The site contains archaeological remains which could provide further information concerning the living conditions on the property and the development of the homestead and associated complex of buildings from the 1840s.

The place is important in demonstrating the principal characteristics of a particular class of cultural places.

The homestead and surrounding landscape provide evidence of the way of life of a large Darling Downs Station, from its establishment to eventual decline, and the building is symbolic of the power and prestige of the Darling Downs squatters in the mid to late nineteenth century.

The place is important because of its aesthetic significance.

As a ruin of a grand homestead, which has strong associations with the history and pastoral development of the Darling Downs, the building has unique aesthetic and cultural attributes and has been the subject of much community concern and recent conservation action, as reflected in its current administration by the Glengallan Homestead Trust Ltd.

The place is important in demonstrating a high degree of creative or technical achievement at a particular period.

The fabric of the building exhibits a sophisticated design approach, and the detailing of the materials reflects a fine quality of craftsmanship. Some elements of the building were technically innovative for the time, particularly the verandah louvre system and French doors with insect screens, reflecting a consideration for the Queensland climate and conditions.

The place has a strong or special association with a particular community or cultural group for social, cultural or spiritual reasons.

As a ruin of a grand homestead, which has strong associations with the history and pastoral development of the Darling Downs, the building has unique aesthetic and cultural attributes and has been the subject of much community concern and recent conservation action, as reflected in its current administration by the Glengallan Homestead Trust Ltd.

The place has a special association with the life or work of a particular person, group or organisation of importance in Queensland's history.

The district surrounding Glengallan Homestead was part of the area Allan Cunningham discovered and explored in 1827. The Glengallan Run was part of the first Darling Downs run, selected by Patrick Leslie in 1840, and was established and named by brothers Colin and John Campbell in 1841–42.

The homestead was built in 1867–68 by John Deuchar who, with partner Charles Henry Marshall, established the famous Glengallan Merino flock and Shorthorn stud. The breeding tradition established by Deuchar was further developed by William Ball Slade who maintained the pre-eminence of the Glengallan stud from 1873 until the property was sold in 1904.

Slade was also described as the archetypal Anglo-Australian patrician of Warwick, being a patron, office-bearer, benefactor and member of numerous societies, clubs, the Masonic Lodge and Anglican Church.
