= East Haldon, Queensland =

East Haldon
- Suburb
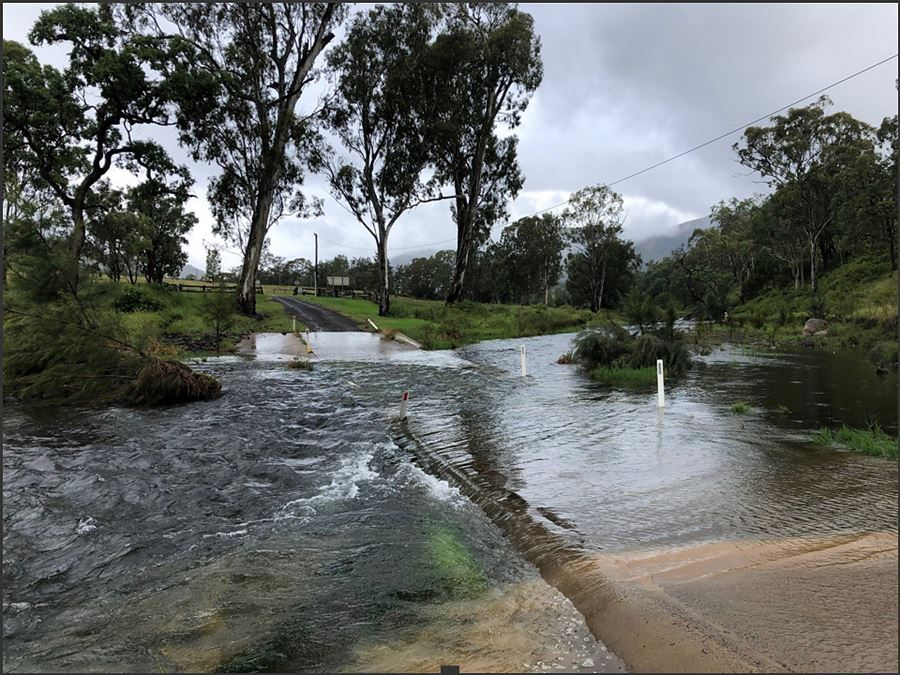
- Flooding at Blackfellow Creek, East Haldon, 2022

- Interactive map of East Haldon
- Coordinates: 27.8924°S 152.2875°E
- Country: Australia
- State: Queensland
- LGA: Lockyer Valley Region
- Location: 14.5 km (9.0 mi) S of Mount Sylvia; 37.6 km (23.4 mi) S of Gatton; 62.3 km (38.7 mi) SE of Toowoomba; 129 km (80 mi) WSW of Brisbane

Government
  - State electorate: Lockyer
  - Federal division: Wright

Area
  - Total: 160.0 km^{2} (61.8 sq mi)
- Elevation: 261–1,039 m (856–3,409 ft)

Population
  - Total: 35 (2021 census)
  - Density: 0.219/km^{2} (0.567/sq mi)
- Postcode: 4343
Suburbs around East Haldon
Junction View	Lefthand Branch	Townson
Black Duck Creek	East Haldon	Townson
Black Duck Creek	Goomburra	Goomburra

East Haldon is a rural locality in the Lockyer Valley Region, Queensland, Australia. In the 2021 census, East Haldon had a population of 35 people.

== Geography ==
The terrain is mountainous. The Main Range (part of the Great Dividing Range) forms the southern boundary of the locality, while the Mistake Mountains range forms the eastern boundary. The western boundary of the locality also follows the ridgeline of an unnamed range, creating a valley. Blackfellow Creek rises close to the meeting of the Main Range and Mistake Mountains in the south-east of the locality and flows in a north-westerly direction through the locality exiting to the north-west (Junction View). The creek traverses from the almost the highest point of the locality to its lowest point, 261–1,039 metres (856–3,409 ft) above sea level.

The only route into the locality is East Haldon Road, which enters the locality from Junction View to the north-west and loosely follows the course of Blackfellow Creek terminating in the national park.

Apart from the north-west of the locality, the locality is within the protected areas of the Main Range National Park and the Main Range Conservation Park. In the north-west, the land use is predominantly grazing on native vegetation with some crop growing along Blackfellow Creek.

East Haldon has the following mountains:

- Mount Arthur (27.8621°S 152.2038°E) 763 metres (2,503 ft)
- Mount Edgar (27.8710°S 152.2135°E) 745 metres (2,444 ft)
- Mount Haldon (27.8199°S 152.2291°E) 906 metres (2,972 ft)
- Mount Lowe (27.8449°S 152.2864°E) 832 metres (2,730 ft)
- Mount Philp (27.8734°S 152.2555°E) 910 metres (2,990 ft)
- Mount William (27.8454°S 152.2677°E) 843 metres (2,766 ft)
- Point Pure (27.9330°S 152.3127°E) 892 metres (2,927 ft)

== Demographics ==
In the 2016 census, East Haldon had a population of 29 people.

In the 2021 census, East Haldon had a population of 35 people.

== Education ==
There are no schools in East Haldon. The nearest government primary school is Mount Sylvia State School in Mount Sylvia to the north. The nearest government secondary school is Lockyer District State High School in Gatton to the north.
