= Hendon, Queensland =

Hendon
- Town
- Interactive map of Hendon
- Coordinates: 28.0711°S 151.9508°E
- Country: Australia
- State: Queensland
- LGA: Southern Downs Region
- Location: 18.0 km (11.2 mi) SSE of Clifton; 22.2 km (13.8 mi) NNW of Warwick; 66.3 km (41.2 mi) S of Toowoomba; 123 km (76 mi) SW of Ipswich; 162 km (101 mi) SW of Brisbane

Government
  - State electorate: Warrego
  - Federal division: Maranoa

Area
  - Total: 10.0 km^{2} (3.9 sq mi)

Population
  - Total: 227 (2021 census)
  - Density: 22.70/km^{2} (58.8/sq mi)
- Time zone: UTC+10:00 (AEST)
- Postcode: 4362
Localities around Hendon
Talgai	Allora	Mount Marshall
Talgai	Hendon	Mount Marshall
Deuchar	Deuchar	Deuchar

Hendon is a rural town and locality in the Southern Downs Region, Queensland, Australia. In the 2021 census, the locality of Hendon had a population of 227 people.

== Geography ==
Hendon is situated 25 kilometres (16 mi) north of Warwick and about 160 kilometres (99 mi) southwest of Brisbane.

== History ==
The town of Hendon developed after the opening of the Southern railway line from Gowrie Junction (near Toowoomba) to Hendon railway station on 11 March 1869. The Southern line was extended to Millhill on 9 January 1871, and across the Condamine River to Cherry Gully on 8 December 1880, to Stanthorpe by 3 May 1881, reaching New South Wales border at Wallangarra on 14 February 1887.

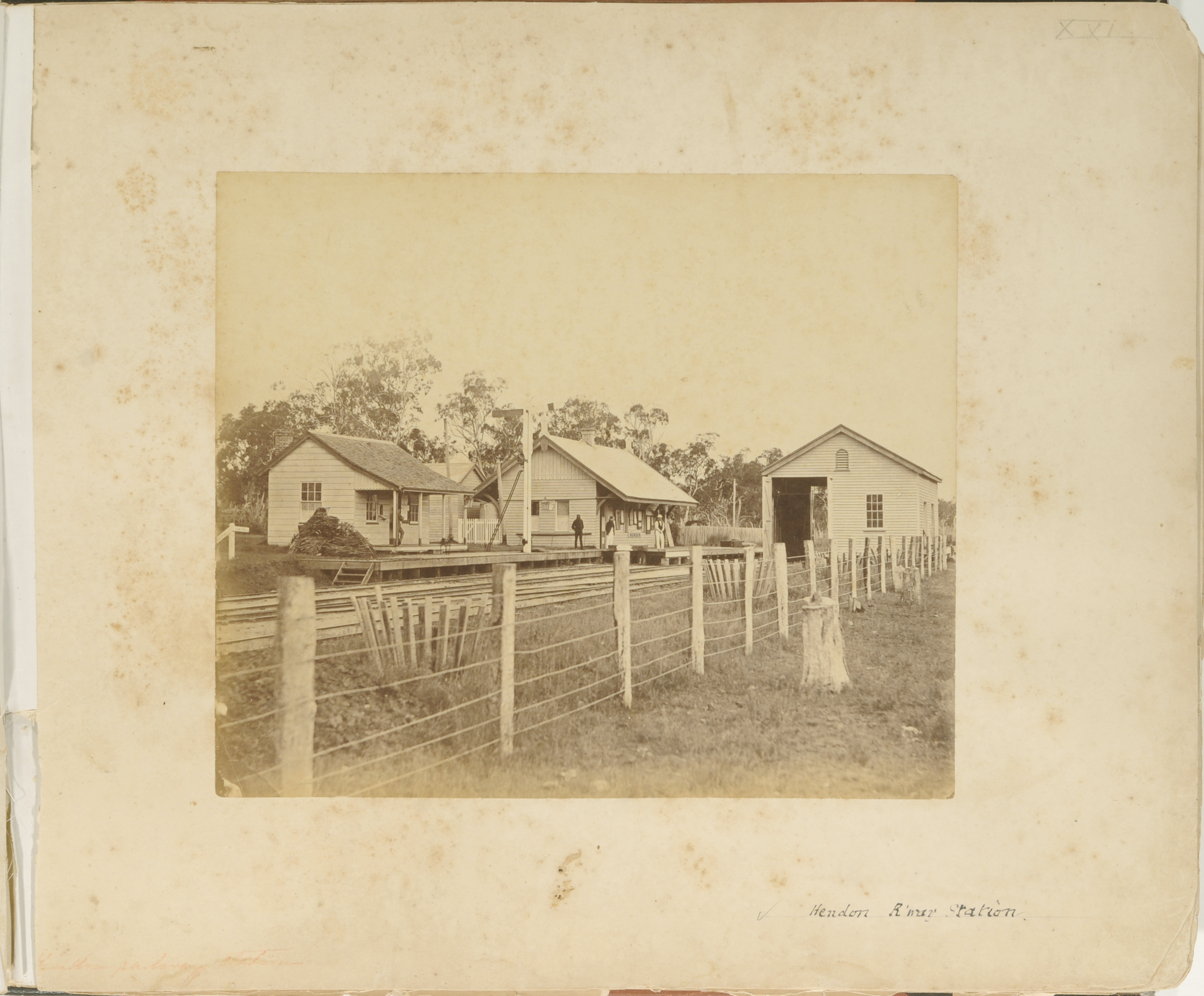
Hendon Railway Station, Queensland. circa 1877

The town takes its name from the Hendon railway station, which in turn was originally named Allora in 1869, but was changed to Hendon in mid-1870s as the station was 5 kilometres (3.1 mi). from the town of Allora. Hendon was the name of a settler in the district.

Hendon Post Office opened on 1 April 1877 and closed in 1968.

Hendon Provisional School opened on 5 June 1882, later becoming Hendon State School. The school closed on 1 June 1954.

Hendon served as the railhead for the town of Allora (surveyed in 1859), located four miles to the northeast. Black-soil roads linking Allora with the railway were often impassable after heavy rain. The residents of Allora and the Allora Municipal Council lobbied for a railway connection, which was opened from Hendon to Allora on 21 April 1897. The railway was built under the Railways Guarantee Act (1895), which required the Allora Municipal Council to share any losses and profits with the Railway Department for a period of 14 years. Due to the branch line's short length, the revenue apportionment between the main and branch lines was adjusted in 1899 to ensure the branch line's receiving its fair share of income. When the guarantee expired, the Allora Municipal Council received £1,200 as its share of the profits. An extension of the branch to Goomburra (19 kilometres (12 mi) east of Hendon) opened on 23 August 1912.

In its early days Hendon consisted of the Railway Hotel, a hall, the primary school and a golf course. The hotel was located in Railway Street, adjacent to the railway station. The primary school opened in 1882; in 1887 it had an enrollment of 195 students, but the building was destroyed by fire on 19 October 1926. The new school building was moved from View Glen (near Toowoomba) to Hendon, and was completed on 14 June 1927. It closed on 1 June 1954.

The township was surveyed into a number of residential blocks; streets were named for district towns, early settlers and streams (such as Maryvale, Goomburra, Leslie and Glengallan). The population slowly drifted away from Hendon, which resulted in the loss of public facilities. The hall was moved to a district farm, and the hotel and school buildings disappeared. The railway station in 1963 had a stationmaster in charge, a siding accommodation, a fork-line connection to the Allora branch, telegraph and signal communication, cattle, sheep and pig yards and a goods shed. As of 2011, apart from the railway lines all other infrastructure is gone. The Goomburra branch was closed beyond Allora on 1 July 1961, with the balance of the branch out of use by the mid-1990s.

A number of new homes have been built in Hendon, and the population is slowly increasing. A steel merchant operates within the town; this business is the only major commercial enterprise.

== Demographics ==
In the 2006 census, the locality of Hendon (then in the Shire of Warwick) had a population of 519 people.

In the 2016 census, the locality of Hendon had a population of 200 people.

In the 2021 census, the locality of Hendon had a population of 227 people.

== Education ==
There are no schools in Hendon. The nearest government primary school is Allora State School in neighbouring Allora to the north. The nearest government secondary school is Allora State School (to Year 10), Clifton State High School (to Year 12) in Clifton to the north-west, and Warwick State High School (to Year 12) in Warwick to the south-east.
