= Goomburra railway line =

Former railway line in Queensland

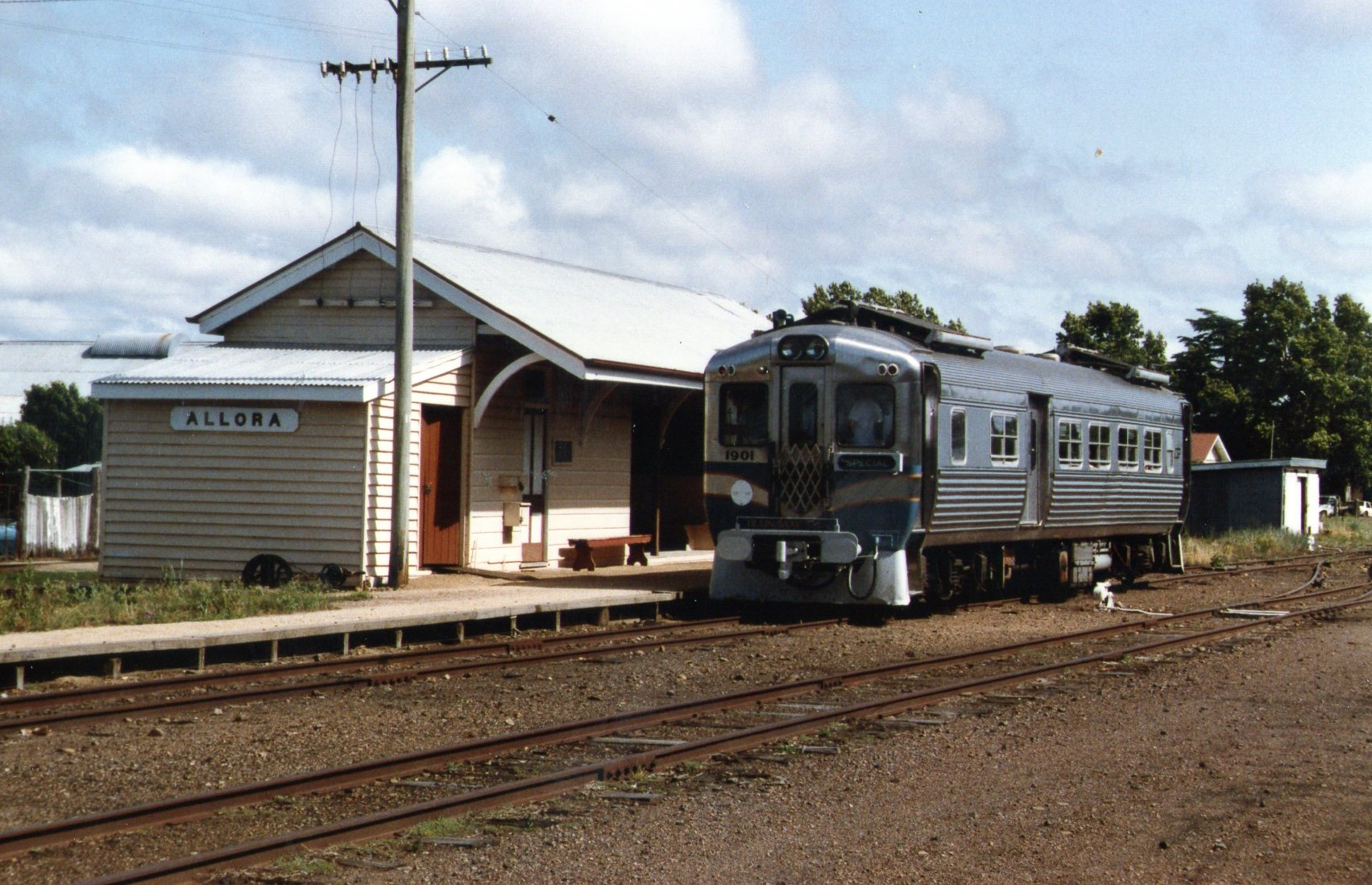
RM1901 at Allora Station ~1991

The Goomburra railway line was a branch railway in the Southern Downs region of Queensland, Australia.

== History ==
Construction of the Southern railway line from Toowoomba to Warwick brought it as far as Dalrymple Creek near Allora in 1869. At that time, Allora was the largest settlement in the region but the line ran about five kilometres to its west and the then terminus was renamed Hendon in the 1870s. A line from Hendon to Allora was surveyed in 1884 but the local residents pushed for connection to a proposed direct link between Brisbane and Warwick. The latter link did not materialise but a line running the short distance from Hendon to Allora was constructed and opened on 21 April 1897.

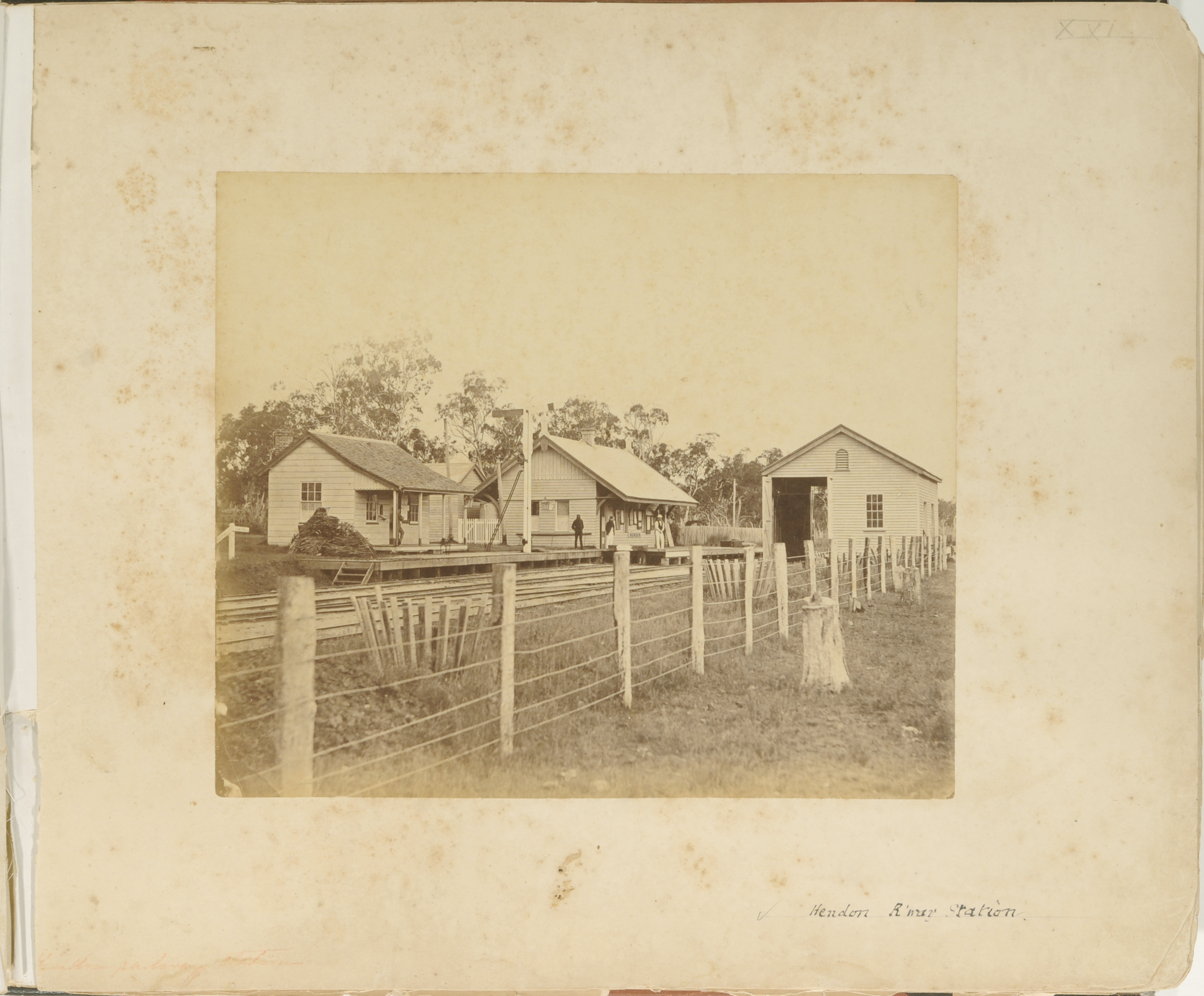
Hendon Railway Station, Queensland. circa 1877

Up to four trains daily connected via Kates with the main line services at Hendon. After development of land to the east of Allora, moves were afoot to extend the line about 20 kilometres to Goomburra. Approved in 1910, construction of the extension commenced in 1911 and opened on 8 July 1912. Stops were located at Kital, Berat and Kunda. The Goomburra extension was constructed from a point a short distance down from Allora station, turning Allora station and yard into a short spur. Traffic from Allora to Goomburra or vice versa was required to perform a back shunt.

In addition to passenger traffic, freight carried on the Goomburra line included dairy products, timber and seasonal grain but its justification did not last.

The section of the line beyond Allora was closed on 30 June 1961 due to increasing competition from road transport. Service on the Hendon to Allora section was suspended in 1995.

The Hendon to Allora section is now owned by the Southern Downs Steam Railway, a rail heritage organisation based in Warwick which intends to run tourist steam trains on this section.

== See also ==
- Rail transport in Queensland
