= Glengallan, Queensland =

Glengallan
- Suburb
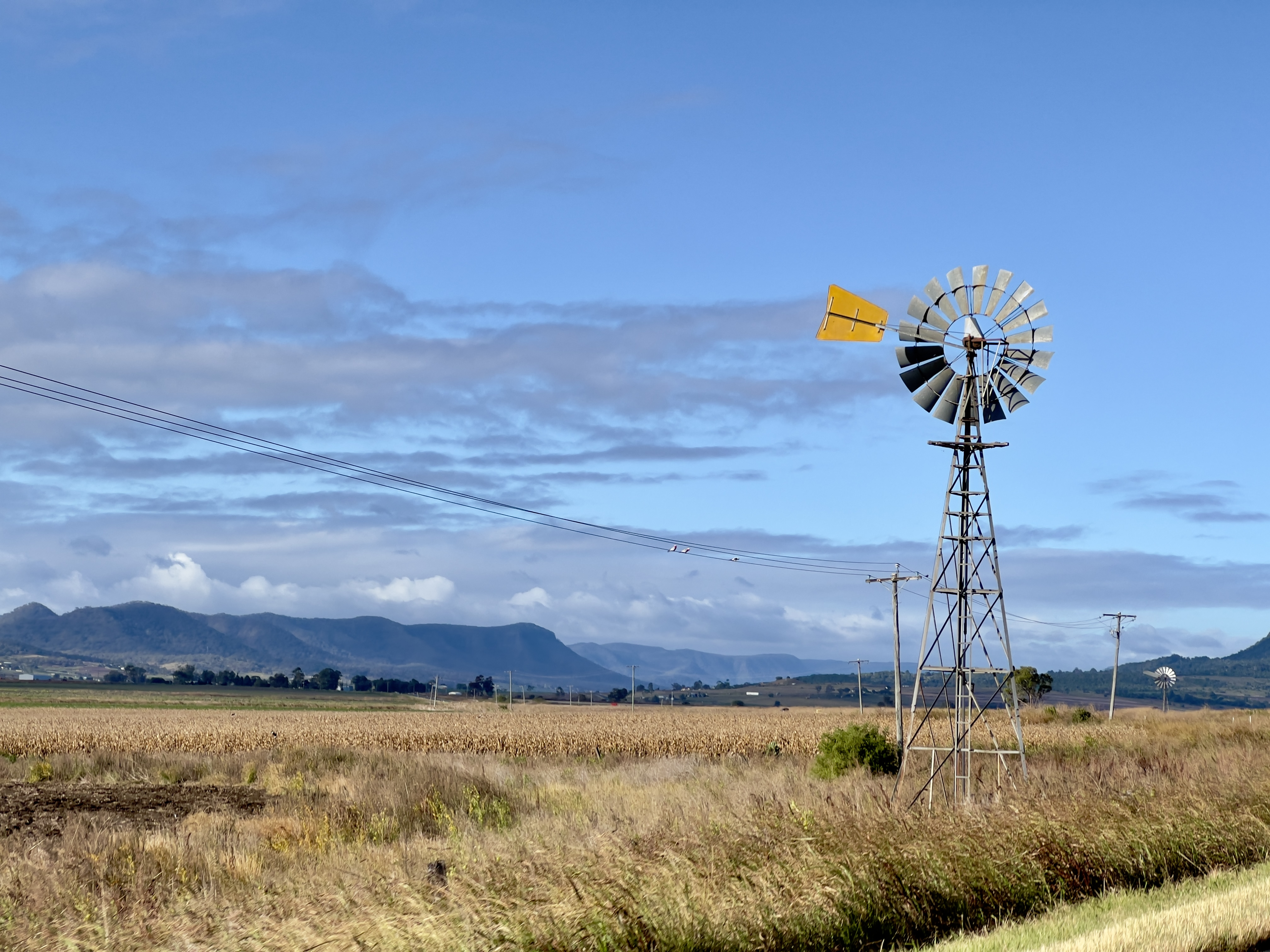
- Windmill in Glengallan, 2023

- Interactive map of Glengallan
- Coordinates: 28.1091°S 152.0616°E
- Country: Australia
- State: Queensland
- LGA: Southern Downs Region
- Location: 10.7 km (6.6 mi) SE of Allora; 15.2 km (9.4 mi) NNE of Warwick; 68.2 km (42.4 mi) S of Toowoomba; 149 km (93 mi) SW of Brisbane

Government
  - State electorate: Southern Downs
  - Federal division: Maranoa

Area
  - Total: 22.3 km^{2} (8.6 sq mi)
- Elevation: 460 to 601 m (1,509 to 1,972 ft)

Population
  - Total: 57 (2021 census)
  - Density: 2.556/km^{2} (6.62/sq mi)
- Time zone: UTC+10:00 (AEST)
- Postcode: 4370
Suburbs around Glengallan
| Mount Marshall | Mount Marshall | Mount Marshall |
| Willowvale | Glengallan | Clintonvale |
| Willowvale | Sladevale | Sladevale |

Glengallan is a rural locality in the Southern Downs Region, Queensland, Australia. In the 2021 census, Glengallan had a population of 57 people.

== Geography ==
Glengallan is part of the Darling Downs.

The New England Highway enters the locality from the north-west (Mount Marshall). The Cunningham Highway enters the locality from the south-east and merges with the New England Highway, and then together exits the locality to the south (Willowvale and Sladevale).

The land is mostly flat (approx 460 metres (1,510 ft) above sea level except for Mount Marshall in the north-east of the locality (28.0955°S 152.0715°E) which rises to 601 metres (1,972 ft).

The land use is predominantly crop growing with grazing on native vegetation on the sloes of Mount Marshall.

== History ==
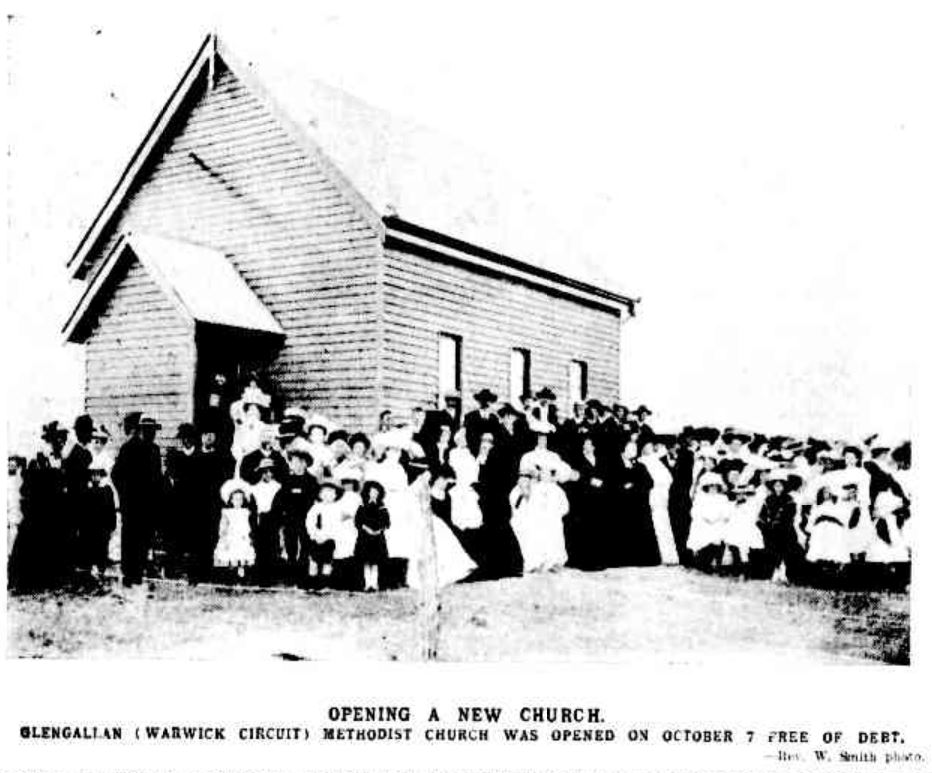
Glengallan Methodist Church, at its opening

The name Glengallan derives from the name of the pastoral run, taken up by Colin and John Campbell in 1841.

Glengallan Station School opened circa 1886 for the education for the children of the staff of Glengallan Station. In 1891, it became Glengallan Provisional School. On 1 January 1909, it became Glengallon State School. It closed in 1921. In late 1922 or early 1923, it was amalgamated with Wilsonville State School to become Mount Marshall State School, which closed in 1965.

On Monday 14 September 1908, the foundation stone of St Andrew's Anglican Church was laid by Archdeacon Rivers. The church was dedicated on 23 November 1908 by Archbishop St Clair Donaldson. It closed in 1962.

Glengallan Methodist church opened on Sunday 4 October 1908 with a celebratory tea meeting on Wednesday 7 October 1908.

Glengallan Presbyterian Church was officially opened and dedicated on Sunday 19 September 1909 by Reverend R. Kerr. It was on a site donated by Walter Skerman opposite the provisional school.

== Demographics ==
In the 2016 census, Glengallan had a population of 54 people.

In the 2021 census, Glengallan had a population of 57 people.

== Heritage listings ==
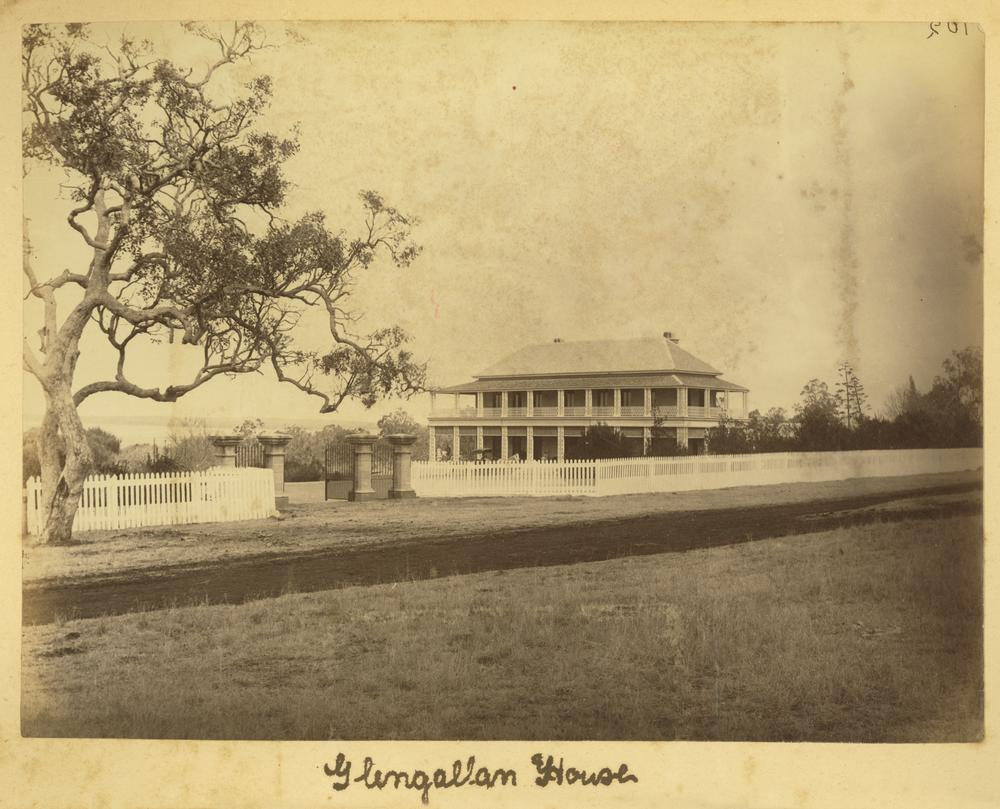
Glengallan House

Glengallan has a number of heritage-listed sites, including:

- Glengallan Homestead, New England Highway

== Education ==
There are no schools in Glengallan. The nearest government primary schools are Allora State School in Allora to the north-west and Freestone State School in Freestone to the south-east. The nearest government secondary schools are Allora State School (to Year 10) in Allora and Warwick State High School (to Year 12) in Warwick to the south.
