= Forest Springs, Queensland =

Forest Springs
- Suburb
- Interactive map of Forest Springs
- Coordinates: 27.9911°S 152.0666°E
- Country: Australia
- State: Queensland
- LGA: Southern Downs Region
- Location: 16.5 km (10.3 mi) NW of Allora; 20.4 km (12.7 mi) E of Clifton; 34.6 km (21.5 mi) NNE of Warwick; 153 km (95 mi) SW of Brisbane

Government
  - State electorate: Southern Downs
  - Federal division: Maranoa

Area
  - Total: 52.4 km^{2} (20.2 sq mi)

Population
  - Total: 104 (2021 census)
  - Density: 1.985/km^{2} (5.140/sq mi)
- Time zone: UTC+10:00 (AEST)
- Postcode: 4362
Suburbs around Forest Springs
Spring Creek	Upper Pilton	Goomburra
Allora	Forest Springs	Goomburra
Allora	Berat	Goomburra

Forest Springs is a rural locality in the Southern Downs Region, Queensland, Australia. In the 2021 census, Forest Springs had a population of 104 people.

== Geography ==
The north-east of the locality is mountainous, rising to Mount Tickle, a peak of 717 metres (2,352 ft), and is undeveloped. The rest of the locality is flatter land and is used for farming.

The New England Highway is the western boundary of the locality.

== History ==
Upper Forest Springs Provisional School opened on 15 February 1898. On 1 January 1909 it became Upper Forest Springs State School. It closed on 30 June 1961. The school was on the corner of Forest Springs Road and The Springs Road (27.9846°S 152.0838°E), now in Spring Creek.

== Demographics ==
In the 2016 census, Forest Springs had a population of 69 people.

In the 2021 census, Forest Springs had a population of 104 people.

== Education ==
There are no schools in Forest Springs. The nearest government primary school is Allora State School in neighbouring Allora to the south-west. The nearest government secondary schools are Allora State School (to Year 10 ) and Clifton State High School (to Year 12) in Clifton to the north-west.
