= Goomburra, Queensland =

Goomburra
- Town
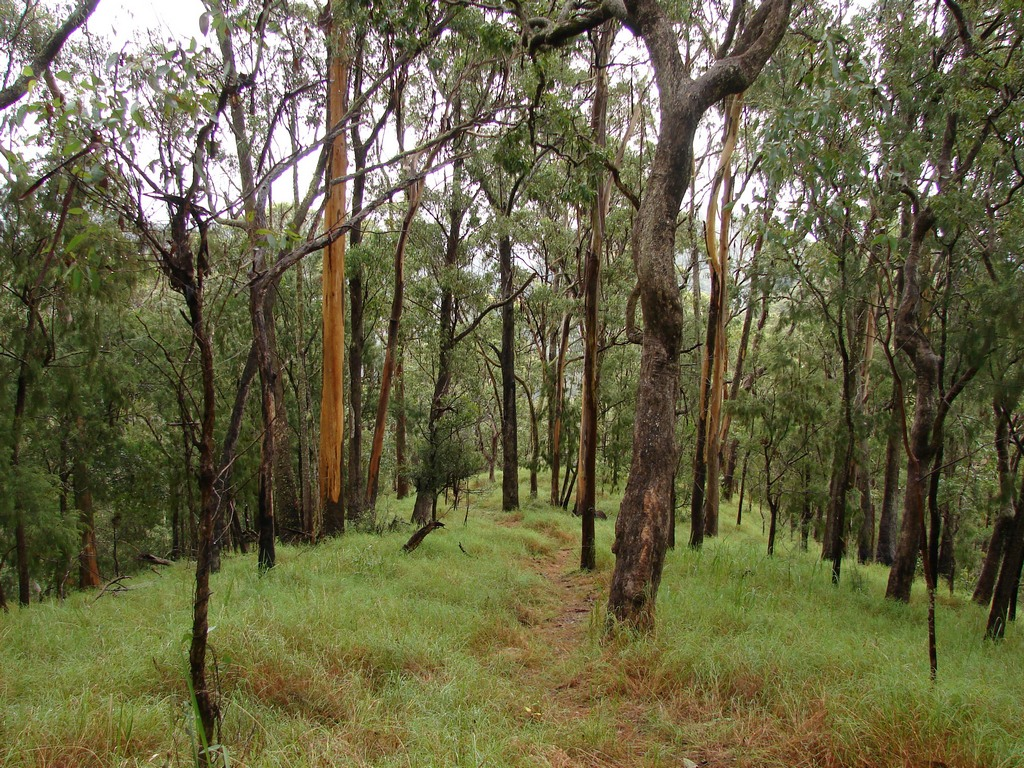
- Eucalypts growing on the ridge line

- Interactive map of Goomburra
- Coordinates: 28.0438°S 152.1205°E
- Country: Australia
- State: Queensland
- LGA: Southern Downs Region
- Location: 15.4 km (9.6 mi) E of Allora; 26.2 km (16.3 mi) NE of Warwick; 70.1 km (43.6 mi) S of Toowoomba; 143 km (89 mi) SW of Brisbane

Government
  - State electorate: Southern Downs
  - Federal division: Maranoa

Area
  - Total: 171.1 km^{2} (66.1 sq mi)

Population
  - Total: 256 (2021 census)
  - Density: 1.496/km^{2} (3.875/sq mi)
- Time zone: UTC+10:00 (AEST)
- Postcode: 4362
Localities around Goomburra
Forest Springs	Upper Pilton	Black Duck Creek; East Haldon
Berat	Goomburra	Townson; Tarome
Clintonvale; Gladfield	Maryvale	North Branch; Tregony

Goomburra is a rural town and locality in the Southern Downs Region, Queensland, Australia. In the 2021 census, the locality of Goomburra had a population of 256 people.

Inverramsay is a neighbourhood in Goomburra (28.0092°S 152.2389°E).

== Geography ==
Goomburra is on the Darling Downs. It is the valley of Dalrymple Creek which flows from east to west away from the Great Dividing Range towards Allora. The creek eventually becomes a tributary of the Condamine River, part of the Murray-Darling river system. Although there is mountainous terrain within the locality with elevations ranging from 495 to 1,100 metres (1,624 to 3,609 ft) above sea level, there is only one named peak, Masters Knob (28.0243°S 152.1050°E) which rises to 684 metres (2,244 ft) above sea level.

The town is located in the south-west of the locality, while Inverramsay is a neighbourhood near the south-eastern boundary of the locality around the Inverramsay Homestead.

The main route through the locality from south-west (Berat) to north-east (East Haldon) is Goomburra Road, becoming Inverramsay Road, Forestry Reserve Road, and Lookout Road.

Goomburra railway station is an abandoned railway station just west of the town. It was the terminus of the closed Goomburra railway line (28.0430°S 152.1151°E).

The north-east of the locality is within the Main Range National Park. Apart from the protected area, the land use is a mix of crop growing (mostly on the lower elevations near Dalrymple Creek), grazing on native vegetation (mostly on the higher elevations), and some rural residential housing.

== History ==
The town's name came from the name of a pastoral run operated by pastoralist Patrick Leslie from 1840 to 1841. It is an Aboriginal word which is either a corruption of gooneburra meaning fire black tribe, or which means a shield derived from the kurrajong tree.

Goomburra State School opened on 25 April 1881. It closed temporarily in 1905 due to low student numbers. It closed permanently on 14 June 1925.

Circa August 1901, the Queensland Government purchased the Goomburra pastoral run of 13,253 acres (5,363 ha). This land was divided for closer settlement and sold in April 1902.

Goomburra Township Provisional School opened on 10 March 1904. On 1 January 1909, it became Goomburra Township State School. Following a fire which destroyed the school, it was closed on 3 January 1972. It was at 17 Inverramsay Road (28.04244°S 152.12053°E). A plaque and signage mark the site.

Goomburra Hall opened in July 1906.

St John's Anglican Church was dedicated in 1911 by The Venerable Arthur Richard Rivers. Its closure circa 2012 was approved by Archbishop Phillip Aspinall. It was at 1095 Goomburra Road (28.04364°S 152.12012°E). As at March 2024, the church building was still extant.

Goomburra was the terminus of the Goomburra railway line which opened in 1912 and closed in 1961.

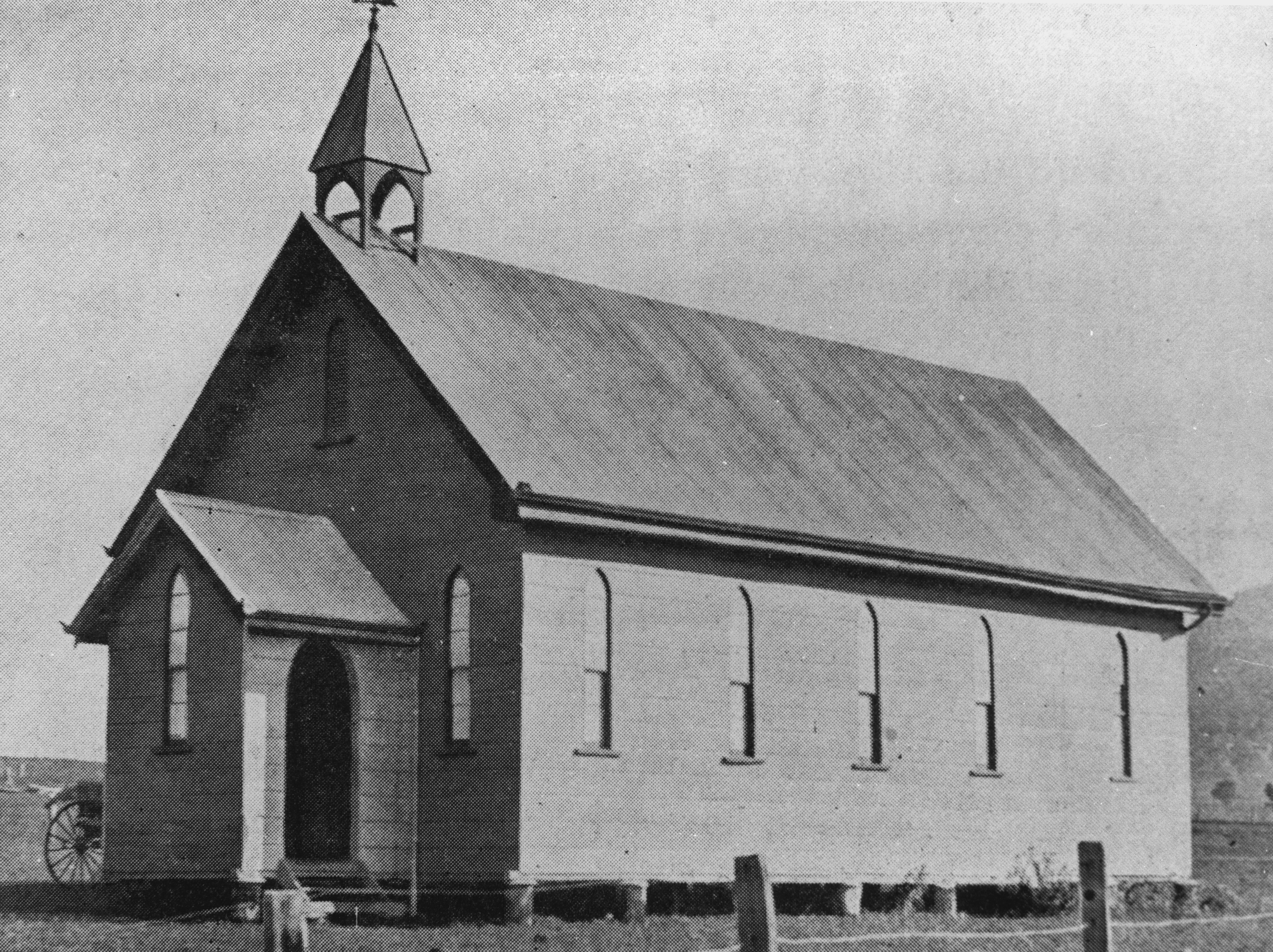
Allora Presbyterian Church, relocated to Goomburra in 1912

In October 1912, the 1879 Presbyterian church building in Allora was relocated to become the Presbyterian church in Goomburra, which is 15 kilometres (9.3 mi) east of Allora. The relocation of the church required two traction engines and took ten days to negotiate difficult terrain and other problems.

Inverramsay State School opened on 2 February 1914 and closed on 22 August 1965. It was at 1194 Inverramsay Road (28.01056°S 152.22941°E).

On 31 December 1919 in the public hall, Littleton Groom (the member for Darling Downs) unveiled the town's honour board, listing the 32 names of those who had performed military service in World War I including 10 who died in the war.

== Demographics ==
In the 2016 census, the locality of Goomburra had a population of 259 people.

In the 2021 census, the locality of Goomburra had a population of 256 people.

== Education ==
There are no schools in Goomburra. The nearest government primary schools are Freestone State School in Freestone to the south-west and Allora State School in Allora to the west. The nearest government secondary schools are Allora State School (to Year 10), Clifton State High School (to Year 12) in Clifton to the north-west, and Warwick State High School (to Year 12) in Warwick to the south-east. Non-government schools are also available in Allora and Warwick.

== Amenities ==
Goomburra Hall is at 17 Inverramsay Road within the town (28.04255°S 152.12002°E).

== Attractions ==
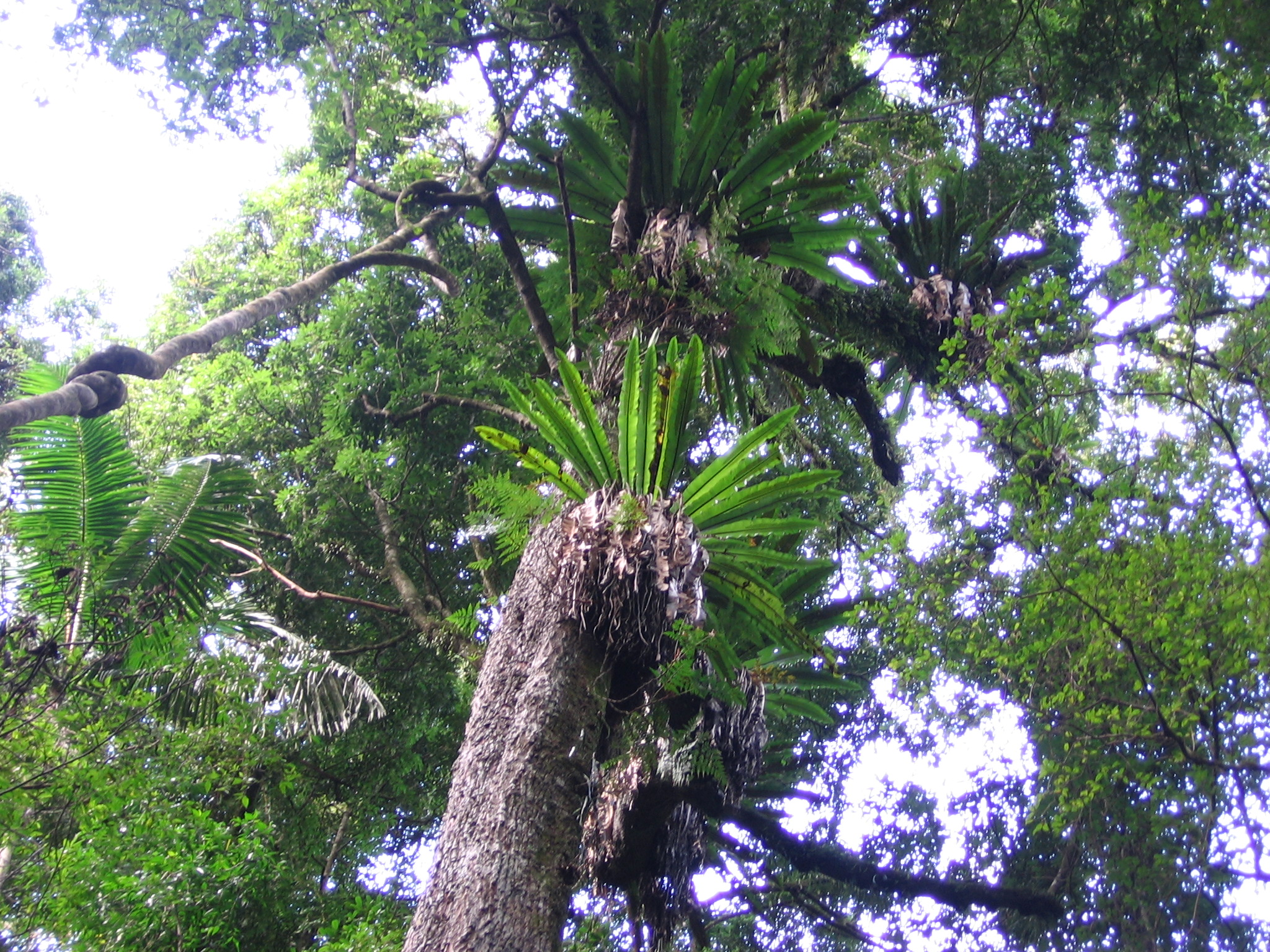
Rainforest canopy, Goomburra section fo Main Range National Park

Forestry Reserve Road and Lookout Road provide access to a number of attractions in the Main Range National Park, including:

- Mount Castle Lookout (27.9677°S 152.3836°E)
- Sylvesters Lookout (27.97651°S 152.38479°E)
- Araucaria Falls (27.96718°S 152.37032°E)
- walking tracks and camping areas
