= Clintonvale, Queensland =

Clintonvale
- Suburb
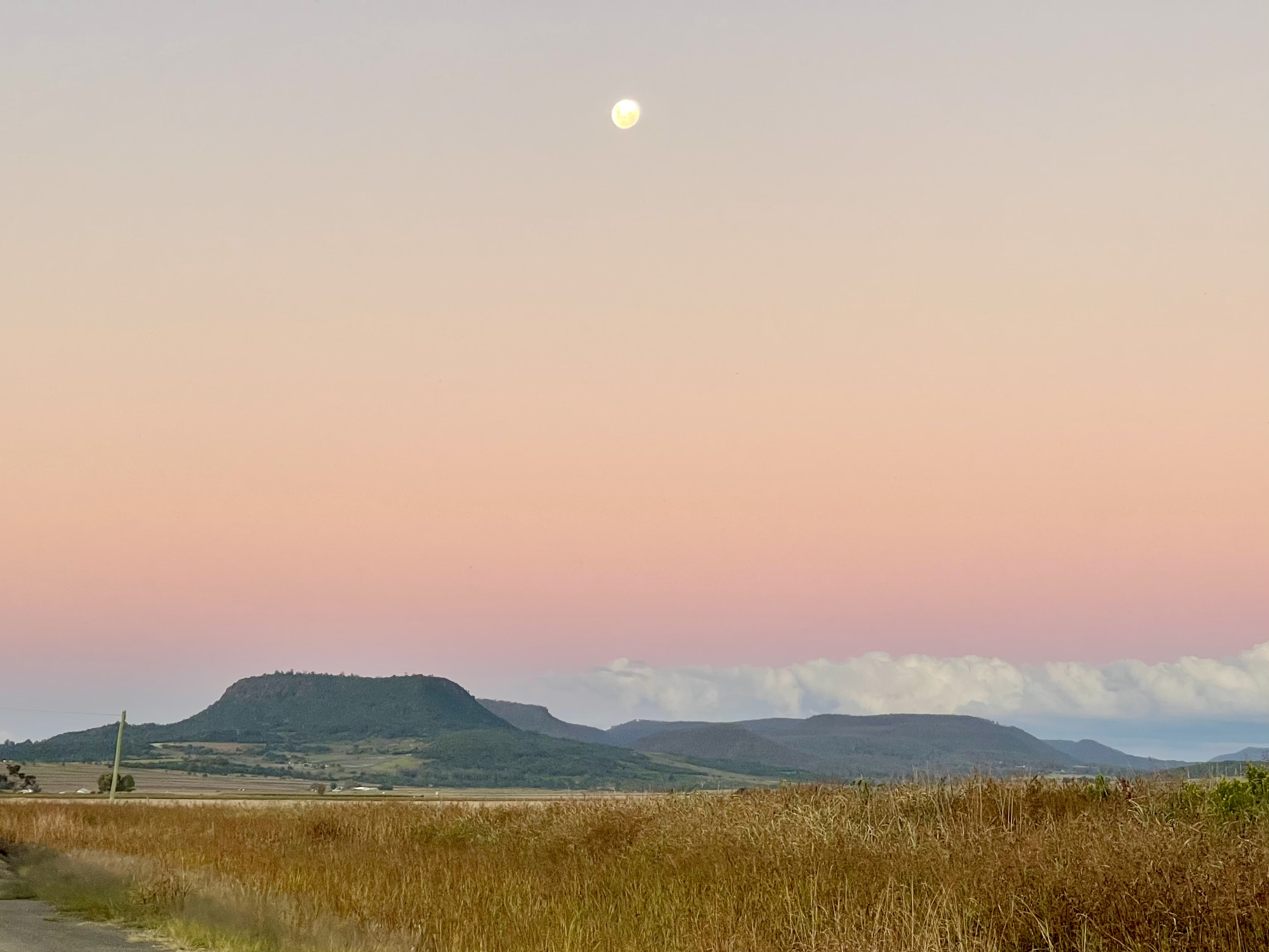
- Sunset and moonrise over Main Range National Park seen from Clintonvale, Queensland, 2021

- Interactive map of Clintonvale
- Coordinates: 28.0958°S 152.1197°E
- Country: Australia
- State: Queensland
- LGA: Southern Downs Region
- Location: 17.3 km (10.7 mi) SE of Allora; 18 km (11 mi) NE of Warwick; 77.7 km (48.3 mi) S of Toowoomba; 141 km (88 mi) SW of Brisbane

Government
  - State electorate: Southern Downs
  - Federal division: Maranoa

Area
  - Total: 33.6 km^{2} (13.0 sq mi)

Population
  - Total: 72 (2021 census)
  - Density: 2.143/km^{2} (5.55/sq mi)
- Time zone: UTC+10:00 (AEST)
- Postcode: 4370
Suburbs around Clintonvale
Berat	Goomburra	Gladfield
Mount Marshall	Clintonvale	Freestone
Glengallan	Sladevale	Freestone

Clintonvale is a rural locality in the Southern Downs Region, Queensland, Australia. In the 2021 census, Clintonvale had a population of 72 people.

== Geography ==
The Cunningham Highway passes through the locality from north-east (Gladfield) to south-west (Glengallan).

Mount Stewart rises to 766 metres (2,513 ft) in the north of the locality (28.0627°S 152.1161°E).

== History ==
The locality was named after Henry E. Clinton, the roads superintendent who oversaw the building of the Warwick-Spicers Gap road in the 1860s.

Ross's Corner Provisional School opened at Cunningham Junction on 22 July 1907. On 1 January 1909, it became Ross's Corner State School. In 1915, it was renamed Clinton Vale State School, eventually Clintonvale State School. It closed in 2001. It was at 22 Clintonvale School Road (28.0956°S 152.1309°E). As at April 2021, the school building is still extant. The school's website was archived.

The Maryvale railway line opened from the Southern railway line to Maryvale on 30 September 1911, with Clintonvale being served by the Clintonvale railway station (28.0959°S 152.1291°E). Originally intended as a segment of a more direct (via recta) railway route from Brisbane to Sydney, the segment from Mount Edwards to Maryvale was never completed and the line remained a local branch line until it closed on 1 November 1960.

== Demographics ==
In the 2016 census, Clintonvale had a population of 74 people.

In the 2021 census, Clintonvale had a population of 72 people.

== Education ==
There are no schools in Clintonvale. The nearest government primary school in Freestone State School in neighbouring Freestone to the south. The nearest government secondary schools are Allora State School (to Year 10) in Allora to the north-west and Warwick State High School (to Year 12) in Warwick to the south-west.

== Amenities ==
Lysaught Park is on the corner of the Cunningham Highway and Clintonvale School Road (28.0951°S 152.1308°E).
