= White Swan (disambiguation) =

White Swan (c.1850—1904) was a Crow Indian Scout for George Armstrong Custer's 7th Cavalry Regiment.

White Swan may also refer to:

== Pubs and restaurants ==
- White Swan Public House, a seafood restaurant in Seattle, Washington
- The White Swan Hotel, Greytown, a hotel in the Wairarapa region of New Zealand

=== United Kingdom ===
- The White Swan, Covent Garden, a Grade II listed public house in Covent Garden, London
- White Swan, Hunmanby, a grade II listed public house in North Yorkshire
- The White Swan, Middleham, a grade II listed public house in North Yorkshire
- The White Swan Inn, Monmouth, a Grade II listed coaching inn in Wales
- The White Swan Inn, Pickering, a grade II listed public house in North Yorkshire
- The White Swan, Twickenham, a Grade II listed public house in the London Borough of Richmond upon Thames

== Other ==
- Any one of several species of swan
- White Swan (prison), a maximum security prison in Solikamsk, Russia
- White Swan, Washington, a census-designated place in Yakima County, Washington
- The White Swan, a 19th-century establishment in London
- SS White Swan, a steamship which was wrecked in June 1862 while carrying members of New Zealand's parliament
- Tupolev Tu-160 (NATO reporting name: Blackjack), a Russian bomber, nicknamed 'White Swan'

== See also ==
- White Swan Inn (disambiguation), including White Swan Hotel
- Old White Swan
