= White Swan Inn =

White Swan Inn may refer to:

- White Swan Inn, Swan Creek, a heritage-listed former inn and now house, Queensland, Australia
- The White Swan Inn, Monmouth, Wales
- White Swan Inn, Norwich; see Norwich Company of Comedians
- The White Swan, Twickenham, England
- White Swan Hotel, Alnwick, Northumberland, England
- White Swan Inn, San Francisco
