= Listed buildings in Hunmanby =

Hunmanby is a civil parish in the county of North Yorkshire, England. It contains 33 listed buildings that are recorded in the National Heritage List for England. Of these, two are at Grade II*, the middle of the three grades, and the others are at Grade II, the lowest grade. The parish contains the village of Hunmanby, and the surrounding countryside. Most of the listed buildings are houses, cottages and associated structures, and the others include a church, a memorial in the churchyard, a market cross, farmhouses and farm buildings, an animal pound, a village lock-up, a public house, a war memorial and a telephone kiosk.

== Key ==
Grade	Criteria
II*	Particularly important buildings of more than special interest
II	Buildings of national importance and special interest

== Buildings ==
Name and location	Photograph	Date	Notes	Grade
All Saints' Church; 54.18136°N 0.32247°W		Late 11th century	The church has been altered and extended through the centuries. It is in sandstone with a tile roof, and consists of a nave, a north aisle, a south porch, a chancel and a west tower. The tower is unbuttressed and has three stages. In the lowest stage are slit windows, the middle stage contains a two-light window with a rounded hood mould, the bell openings have two lights and a square hood mould, on the south front is a clock face, and at the top is an embattled parapet with crocketed corner pinnacles. The porch is cobbled, and has a round-arched doorway with a tympanum containing a Maltese cross.	II*
Market Cross; 54.18031°N 0.32255°W		Medieval	The market cross stands in an enclosure on Cross Hill, it was restored in the 19th century, and is in sandstone. It consists of a tall tapering shaft on a chamfered plinth, on stone steps. The cross has a square plan, and a shallow domed top, and is surmounted by a decorated wrought iron spearhead.	II
Hunmanby Hall; 54.18024°N 0.32478°W		Early 17th century	A house, later part of a school, that has been extended. The building is in red brick with sandstone dressings and a pantile roof. The main front has three storeys, three bays, and gabled cross-wings. The centre block has a chamfered plinth, floor and eaves cornice bands, quoins, a plain parapet, and a hipped roof. The windows are sashes with moulded stone sills and architraves with keystones, and the windows in the middle bay have segmental pediments. The entrance front has two storeys and an attic, three bays, and a three-bay arcade, behind which is a staircase tower, and the cross-wings have Dutch gables.	II*
The Manor House; 54.18138°N 0.31331°W		17th century	The house is in whitewashed chalk, with dressings in brick and stone, quoins, a stepped brick eaves course, and a pantile roof with coped gables and shaped kneelers. There are two storeys and attics, and a rear wing. The doorway has chamfered quoined jambs and a Tudor arch. Most of the windows are mullioned, some also have transoms, and there is a blocked fire window, a sash window, and a dormer. Inside the house is an inglenook fireplace.	II
Batworth Cottage; 54.18357°N 0.32319°W		1694	The house, later divided, is in chalk and brick, with painted quoins, and a pantile roof with coped gables and shaped kneelers. There are two storeys and three bays. On the front are two doorways, and the windows are sashes. Above the right doorway is an initialled datestone, and in the roof is an upper cruck.	II
Wrangham House; 54.18140°N 0.32136°W	—	c. 1715	A vicarage that was extended in 1803 and later used for other purposes, it is in red brick with a moulded floor band, a double modillion eaves course, and a steeply pitched pantile roof with coped tumbled brick gables and shaped kneelers. There are two storeys, a front range of five bays, an extension at the rear right, and a service extension to the left. The central recessed doorway has fluted pilasters, a radial fanlight, and an open pediment. The windows are sashes, and at the rear is a round-headed stair window.	II
3 Bridlington Street; 54.18092°N 0.32177°W	—	Early 18th century	The house, later divided, is in whitewashed chalk, the gable ends in brick, with brick quoins, a stepped eaves course, and a pantile roof with tumbled brick gables. There is one storey and an attic, and two rear wings. On the front are two doorways, the windows are horizontally-sliding sashes, and in the attic is a raking dormer.	II
12 Northgate; 54.18267°N 0.32301°W	—	Early 18th century	The house is in whitewashed brick, with quoins in stone and brick, a stepped eaves course, and a pantile roof. There is one storey and an attic, and two bays. In the ground floor is a doorway with a divided fanlight flanked by sash windows, and the attic contains two small fixed lights.	II
Castle House Farmhouse and Brownridge Cottage; 54.18199°N 0.32272°W		Early 18th century	A farmhouse and a barn, later extended, the house is in whitewashed chalk, and the barn to the left is in brick, whitewashed on the front and with a stepped eaves course. The roof is pantiled and hipped on the right. The house has one storey and an attic, and six bays. On the front is a doorway with a fanlight, and the windows are sashes, some horizontally-sliding. In the attic are raked dormers.	II
Dovecote and stable behind 10 Northgate; 54.18261°N 0.32249°W	—	Mid 18th century (probable)	The buildings are in chalk on a limestone plinth, with repairs in brick, and the stable has a pantile roof. The dovecote has two storeys and rectangular plan, and contains nest boxes in the north and south walls, and the stable is to the west.	II
Service building west of Hunmanby Hall; 54.18026°N 0.32577°W	—	18th century	The building, later used for other purposes, is in orange-red brick on the front and right gable wall, and in chalk at the rear and left side. The right corner is canted with sandstone quoins, there is a stepped and dentilled eaves course, and a pantile roof with a tumbled brick left gable. The building has two storeys and ten bays. Most of the original openings have been altered, most contain sash windows, some horizontally-sliding, and in the right bay is a two-storey square bay window.	II
Stable block north of Hunmanby Hall; 54.18051°N 0.32469°W	—	Mid 18th century	The stable block, later used for other purposes, is in red brick with a modillion eaves course under a course of moulded terracotta and a flat brick parapet. There are two storeys and five bays, the middle three bays projecting and containing a three-bay blind arcade of round-headed arches with imposts on plain pilasters. In the centre is a doorway with a fanlight, the windows are sashes, and all the openings have flat gauged brick arches.	II
Norcote; 54.18365°N 0.32264°W		18th century	A house in chalk with a rendered right wall, a whitewashed brick outbuilding attached to the left, a stepped eaves course, and a pantile roof with a tumbled brick gable on the left. There is a single storey and four bays, and a later lean-to on the left. On the front is a doorway and sash windows, two of them horizontally-sliding, and all the openings have painted wedge lintels.	II
Northgate House; 54.18244°N 0.32296°W		Mid 18th century	A farmhouse in whitewashed brick, the right gable wall rendered, with a floor band, a stepped brick eaves course, and a pantile roof. There are two storeys, three bays, and a rear extension. The central doorway has pilasters, a divided fanlight, and a cornice. The windows are sashes with stone sills and flat gauged brick arches.	II
Village Pound; 54.18182°N 0.31391°W		18th century	The animal pound is in sandstone with a brick upper course and brick quoins. It is a circular enclosure with a wall about 1.25 metres (4 ft 1 in) high with chamfered stone coping, and there is a blocked entrance at the rear.	II
Chestnut House; 54.18257°N 0.32299°W	—	Mid to late 18th century	A farmhouse, later a private house, in whitewashed chalk on a stone plinth, with stone quoins, and a pantile roof with a coped gable and kneeler on the left. There are two storeys, three bays and a rear extension. The central doorway has a divided fanlight, the windows are sashes, and all the openings have flat gauged brick arches.	II
Denmark House; 54.18057°N 0.32293°W		Mid to late 18th century	The house has colour washed rendered brick on the front and chalk on the left gable wall, whitewashed chalk at the rear, and has a floor band, a stepped brick eaves course, and a pantile roof. There are two storeys, four bays, and a rear outshut. In the centre is a doorway with a divided fanlight, and a timber porch with a tile roof. The windows are sashes, and above the doorway is a recessed panel containing a raised relief of a buck's head.	II
Mill Farmhouse; 54.18058°N 0.32173°W		Mid to late 18th century	The house is in whitewashed chalk on a brick plinth, the gable ends are in brick, and it has red brick dressings, quoins, a floor band, a double-dentilled eaves course, and a steeply pitched pantile roof with tumbled brick gables. There are two storeys, a double depth plan, and three bays. In the centre is a doorway with a fanlight, above it is a blocked window, and the other windows are horizontally-sliding sashes with cambered arches of gauged brick. All the openings have brick quoined surrounds.	II
Osgoodby House; 54.18018°N 0.32218°W	—	Late 18th century	A farmhouse divided into two houses, in whitewashed brick, the left gable end in brick and chalk, with quoins, a floor band, and a pantile roof with coped gables and shaped kneelers. There are two storeys and three bays. The doorway has a divided fanlight, and the windows are sashes. Above the doorway is a recessed panel containing a raised relief of a buck's head.	II
White Swan Inn; 54.18103°N 0.32287°W		Late 18th century	The public house is in whitewashed brick with a stepped brick eaves course and a slate roof. There are two storeys and six bays. On the front are two doorways with panelled pilasters, one with a gabled porch, and the other with a cornice, and the windows are sashes.	II
William Richardson memorial 54.18132°N 0.32201°W	—	Late 18th century	The memorial is in the churchyard of All Saints' Church to the east of the church, and it consists of a chest tomb in sandstone with moulded capping. On each side is a recessed panel containing a raised plaque with an inscription under festoons of drapery and ribbons, and over each is a heart in relief pierced by crossed arrows and flanked by oil lamps. In each end panel is an urn in relief, and there are paired scrolls at each corner.	II
Highfield Farmhouse; 54.15498°N 0.31657°W	—	c. 1825	The farmhouse is in red brick, with a stepped eaves course, and a pantile roof. There are two storeys, a double depth plan, and four bays. On the front is a porch, and a doorway with a fanlight. To its left is an altered casement window, and the other windows are sashes. The ground floor windows have segmental gauged brick arches, and those in the upper floor break the eaves course.	II
Saxon House Farmhouse; 54.16233°N 0.31869°W	—	c. 1825	The farmhouse is in red brick, with a stepped eaves course, and a pantile roof. There are two storeys, a double depth plan, and four bays. The doorway has a fanlight, and the windows are sashes, those in the ground floor with segmental gauged brick arches, and those in the upper floor breaking the eaves course.	II
72 Bridlington Street; 54.17847°N 0.31968°W	—	Early 19th century	A house and attached outbuilding, later incorporated in the house, rendered and whitewashed, with a stepped brick eaves course, and a pantile roof. There are two storeys, and the original house has two bays. On the front is a doorway, and the windows are sashes.	II
Bay View Farmhouse; 54.18321°N 0.32311°W	—	Early 19th century	A farmhouse, later a private house, it is rendered and whitewashed on the front, and in whitewashed chalk on the right, with brick quoins on the left, and a pantile roof. There are two storeys, three bays, and a rear extension. In the centre is a doorway, the windows are sashes, and the ground floor windows have painted wedge lintels.	II
Pontreve; 54.18285°N 0.32310°W	—	Early 19th century	The house has a whitewashed and rendered front, whitewashed chalk on the sides, whitewashed brick on the rear wing, and a pantile roof. There are two storeys, a double depth plan, three bays, and a rear wing. In the centre is a doorway with pilasters, a divided fanlight and a cornice, and the windows are sashes.	II
Coach house northeast of Wrangham House; 54.18157°N 0.32117°W	—	Early 19th century	The coach house and stable to the right are in red brick on the front, and the right gable wall is in chalk. It has quoins, a stepped brick eaves course, and a pantile roof with a tumbled brick gable on the left. There is one storey and a loft, and the building contains double doors, a stable door, and a doorway with a divided fanlight, all under segmental arches. The right gable wall is curved and has jettied quoins, and a pitching hole with a quoined surround.	II
Lodge and Gateway, Hunmanby Hall; 54.17406°N 0.31764°W		1829	The gateway is in vermiculated sandstone, and consists of a ruined Gothic arch, flanked by two-bay lodges. The arch is tall and pointed, with three orders and two storeys. In the walls are lancet windows, and the arch contains iron-studded doors, and shaped iron gates with painted iron armorial plaques.	II
Telford House; 54.18035°N 0.32152°W	—	1829	The house is in red brick on a stone plinth, with the left gable wall in chalk, and a pantile roof with coped gables. There are two storeys at the front, one at the rear under a catslide roof, and three bays. The central doorway has pilasters, a fanlight and a cornice., and the windows are sashes with painted wedge lintels. Above the doorway is a datestone.	II
Village lock-up 54.18177°N 0.31403°W		1834	The village lock-up is in blue and pink brick with stone dressings and a hipped slate roof. There is a single storey, a rectangular plan, and two bays. In the centre are two segmental-arched doorways of gauged brick, divided by a pier with a stone impost block, and there is a quoin to each outer jamb. Above each doorway is a horizontal iron grille with a datestone between.	II
Prospect House; 54.18064°N 0.31918°W	—	Early to mid 19th century	A house, later used for other purposes, in painted brick with modillion eaves and a slate roof. There are two storeys, a double depth plan, and three bays. In the centre is a porch with slender columns, and a recessed doorway with panelled reveals and a fanlight. The windows are sashes with wedge lintels, and at the rear is a central round-headed, radial-glazed staircase window.	II
War memorial 54.18043°N 0.32267°W		1921	The war memorial is in an enclosed area approached by steps, and is in Yorkshire stone. It consists of an obelisk with a Latin cross and a sword in relief. This stands on a pedimented tapering pedestal on a three-stepped plinth with a square slab base. Each pediment contains a carving in relief, and on the pedestal and plinth are inscriptions and the names of those lost in the two World Wars.	II
Telephone kiosk 54.18187°N 0.32304°W		1935	The K6 type telephone kiosk on Church Hill was designed by Giles Gilbert Scott. Constructed in cast iron with a square plan and a dome, it has three unperforated crowns in the top panels.	II
