= Swan Creek, Queensland =

Swan Creek
- Suburb
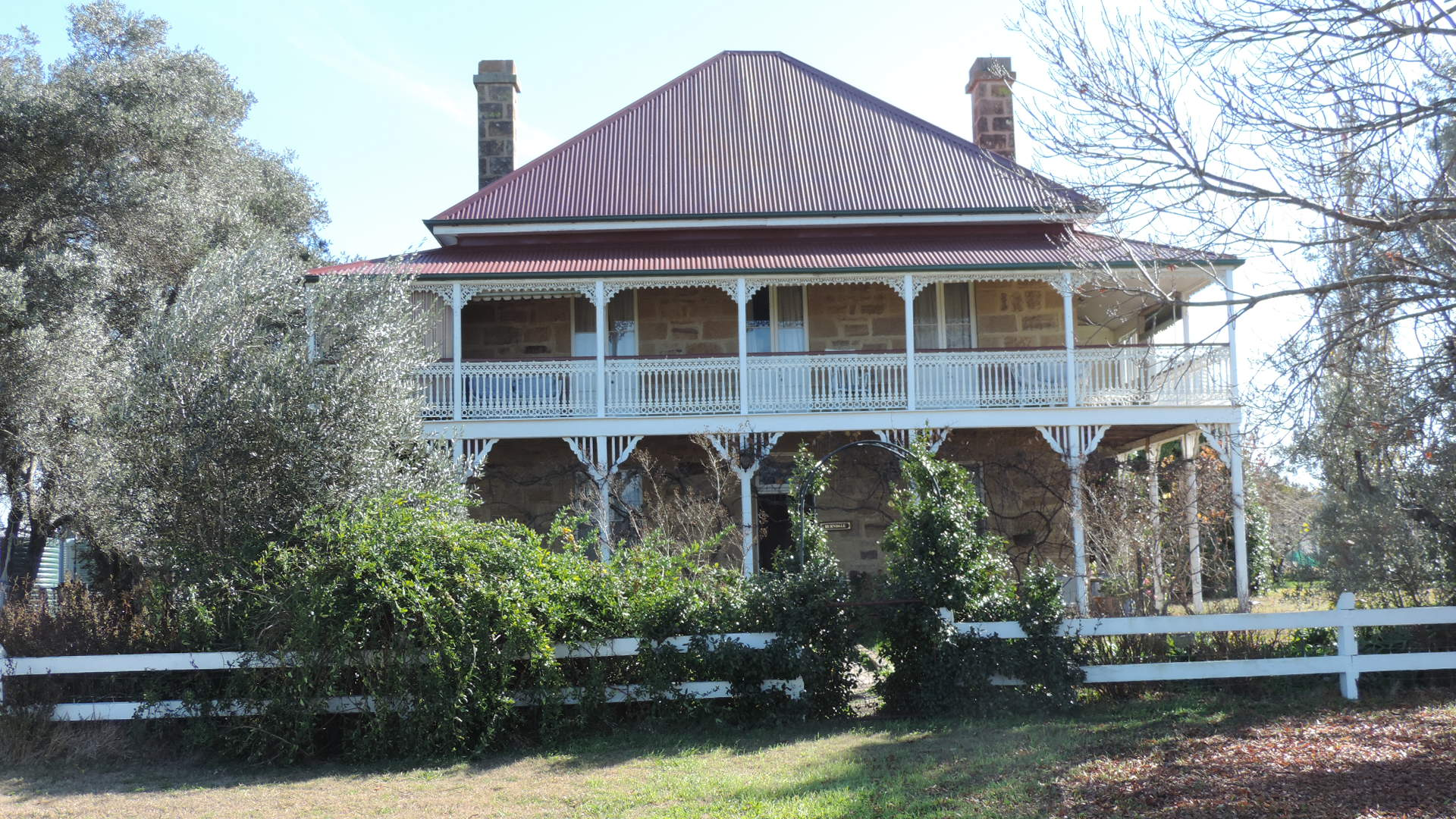
- Burndale heritage house, 2015

- Interactive map of Swan Creek
- Coordinates: 28.1980°S 152.1411°E
- Country: Australia
- State: Queensland
- LGA: Southern Downs Region
- Location: 7.4 km (4.6 mi) W of Yangan; 12.8 km (8.0 mi) E of Warwick; 92.3 km (57.4 mi) S of Toowoomba; 114 km (71 mi) SW of Ipswich; 153 km (95 mi) SW of Brisbane

Government
  - State electorate: Southern Downs
  - Federal division: Maranoa

Area
  - Total: 26.1 km^{2} (10.1 sq mi)

Population
  - Total: 161 (2021 census)
  - Density: 6.169/km^{2} (15.98/sq mi)
- Time zone: UTC+10:00 (AEST)
- Postcode: 4370
Suburbs around Swan Creek
Sladevale	Freestone	Yangan
The Hermitage	Swan Creek	Yangan
The Hermitage	Junabee	Junabee

Swan Creek is a rural locality in the Southern Downs Region, Queensland, Australia. In the 2021 census, Swan Creek had a population of 161 people.

== History ==
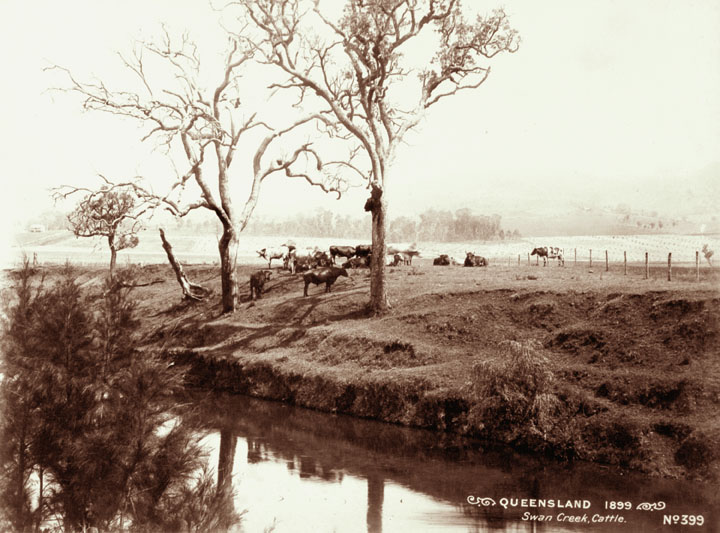
Swan Creek Cattle, circa 1899

A creek called Swan Creek first appears on Buxton's 1864 Darling Downs District Map as part of the Canning Downs pastoral run. By 1883 a smaller pastoral run called Swan Creek had been split off from Canning Downs. It is presumed that the creek acquired its name from the presence of swans at the creek.

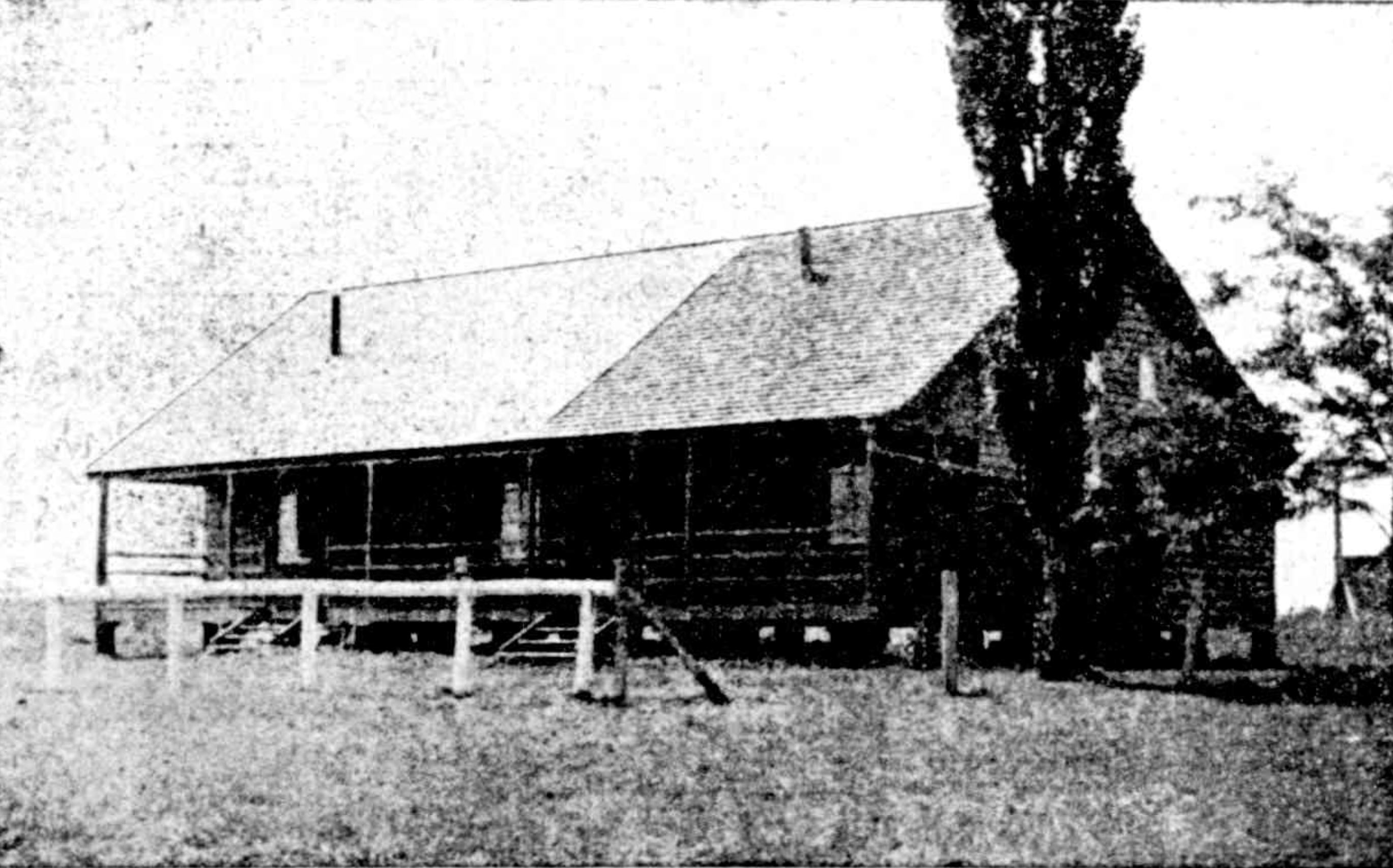
Swan Creek State School, 1911

Swan Creek Lower State School opened on 20 June 1870. Circa 1887 it was renamed Swan Creek State School. It closed on 12 December 1997. It was at 106 Swan Creek School Road (28.1974°S 152.1382°E).

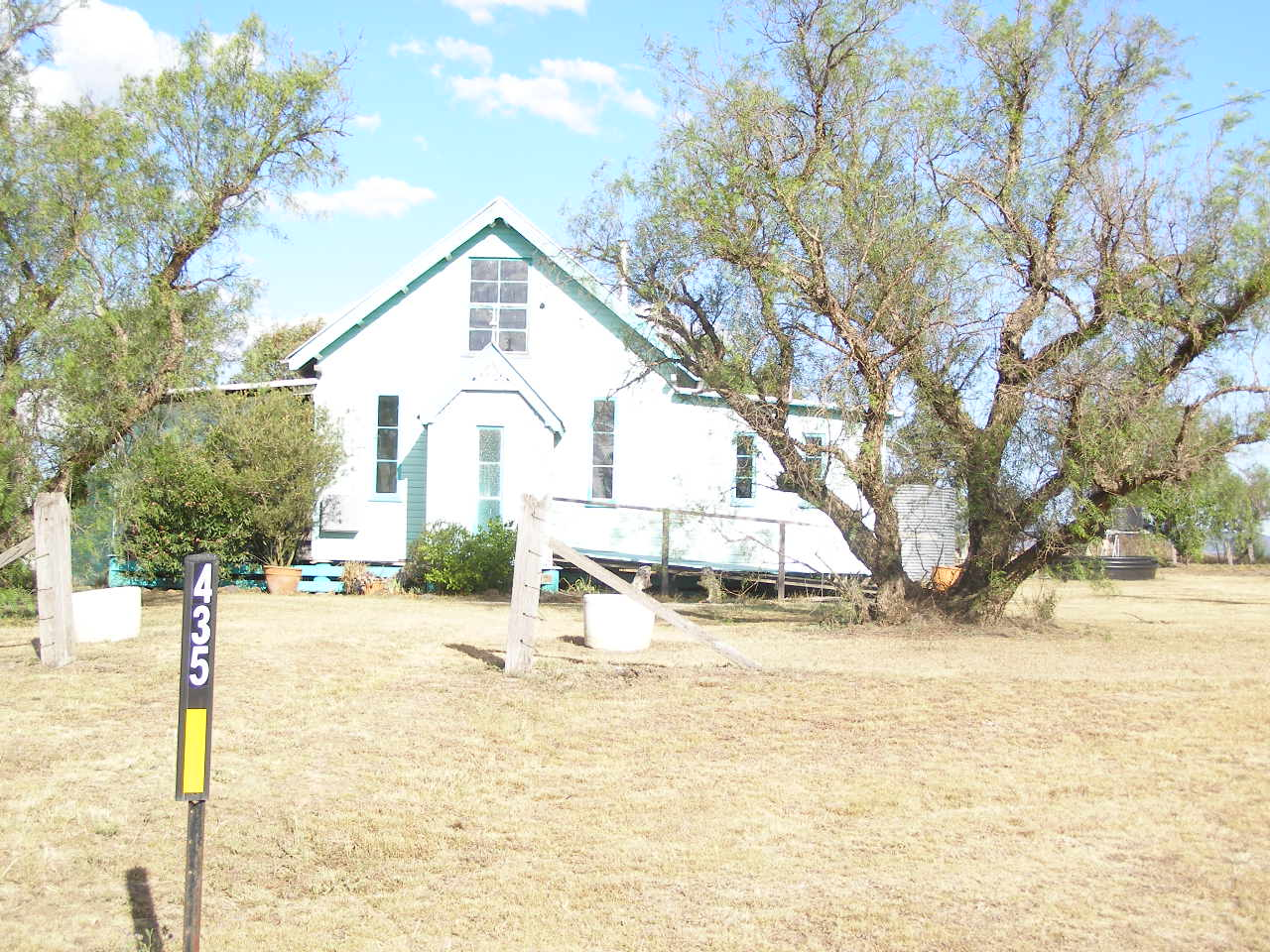
St Andrew's Anglican Church, 2007

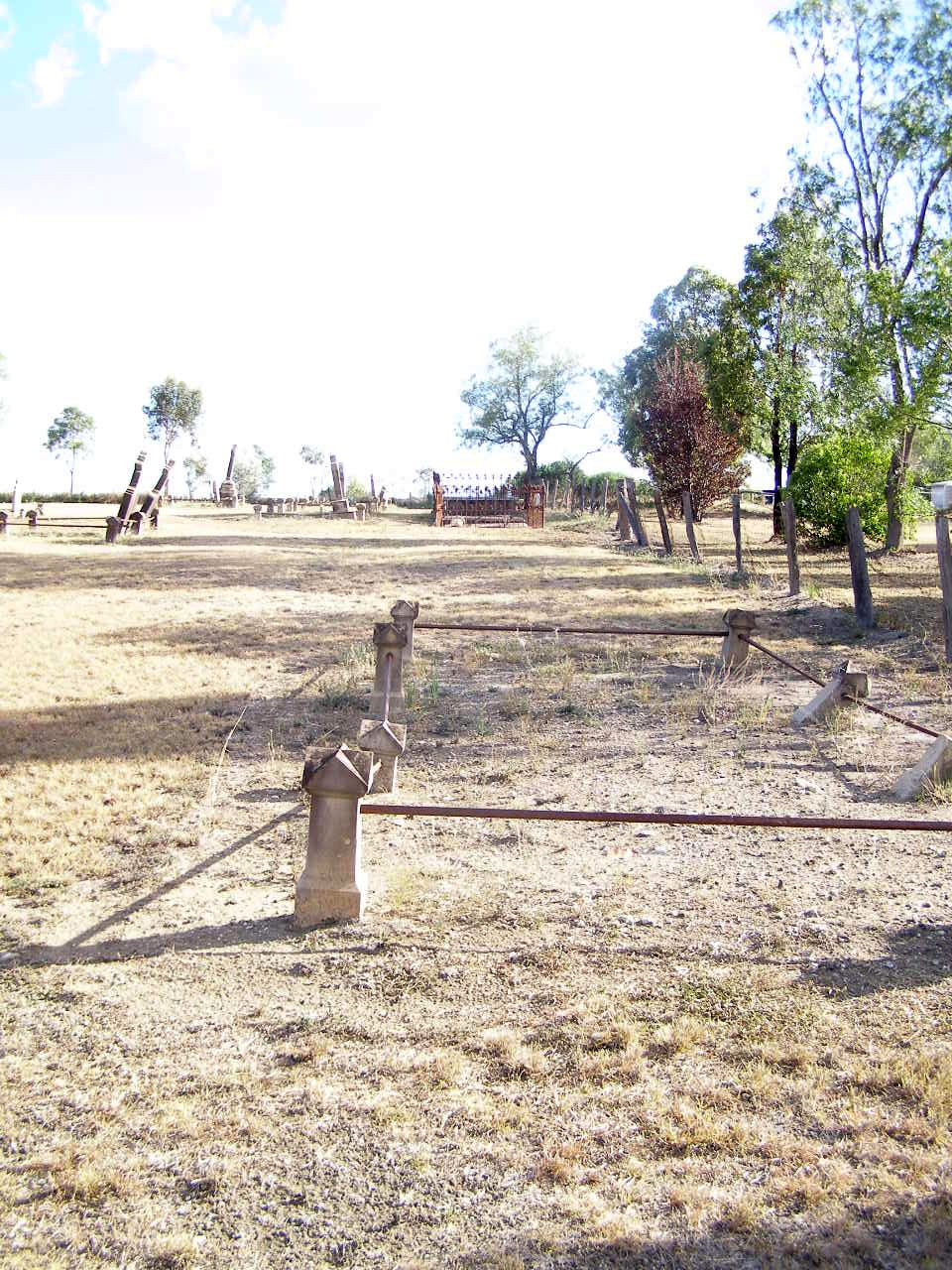
Swan Creek cemetery, 2007

On Wednesday 20 August 1873 the Synod of the Anglican Church purchased a site of 3 acres 1 rood (now 435 Stephens Road on the corner of Swan Creek School Road, 28.1974°S 152.1360°E) for establishing a church adjacent to the school. On Monday 15 September 1873 the local parishioners accepted the tender of Messrs Dodd and Bell to construct a church for £200. In October 1873 the foundation post was laid in a ceremony attending by many in the district. The church was officially opened on Sunday 22 February 1874. In August 1876 a youth broke into the church and hacked the bellows of the harmonium into pieces. It took five more years until the Bishop of Brisbane Matthew Hale consecrated the church on Wednesday 12 May 1879 and dedicated it to St Andrew. The church closed in 1973 but the church building remains on the site. There is a cemetery behind the church building (28.1975°S 152.1365°E).

The first section of the Killarney railway line (from Warwick to Emu Vale) was completed on 2 June 1884 with Swan Creek being served by the Swan Creek railway station (28.1937°S 152.1354°E). The line from Emu Vale to Killarney was completed on 24 August 1885. The Killarney line closed on 1 May 1964.

The Swan Creek School of Arts was officially opened on Tuesday 9 February 1909 by George Barnes, the Member of the Queensland Legislative Assembly for Warwick. It is at 1018 Warwick Yangan Road (corner of Swan Creek Hall Road, 28.1936°S 152.1378°E).

== Demographics ==
In the 2016 census, Swan Creek had a population of 139 people.

In the 2021 census, Swan Creek had a population of 161 people.

== Heritage listings ==
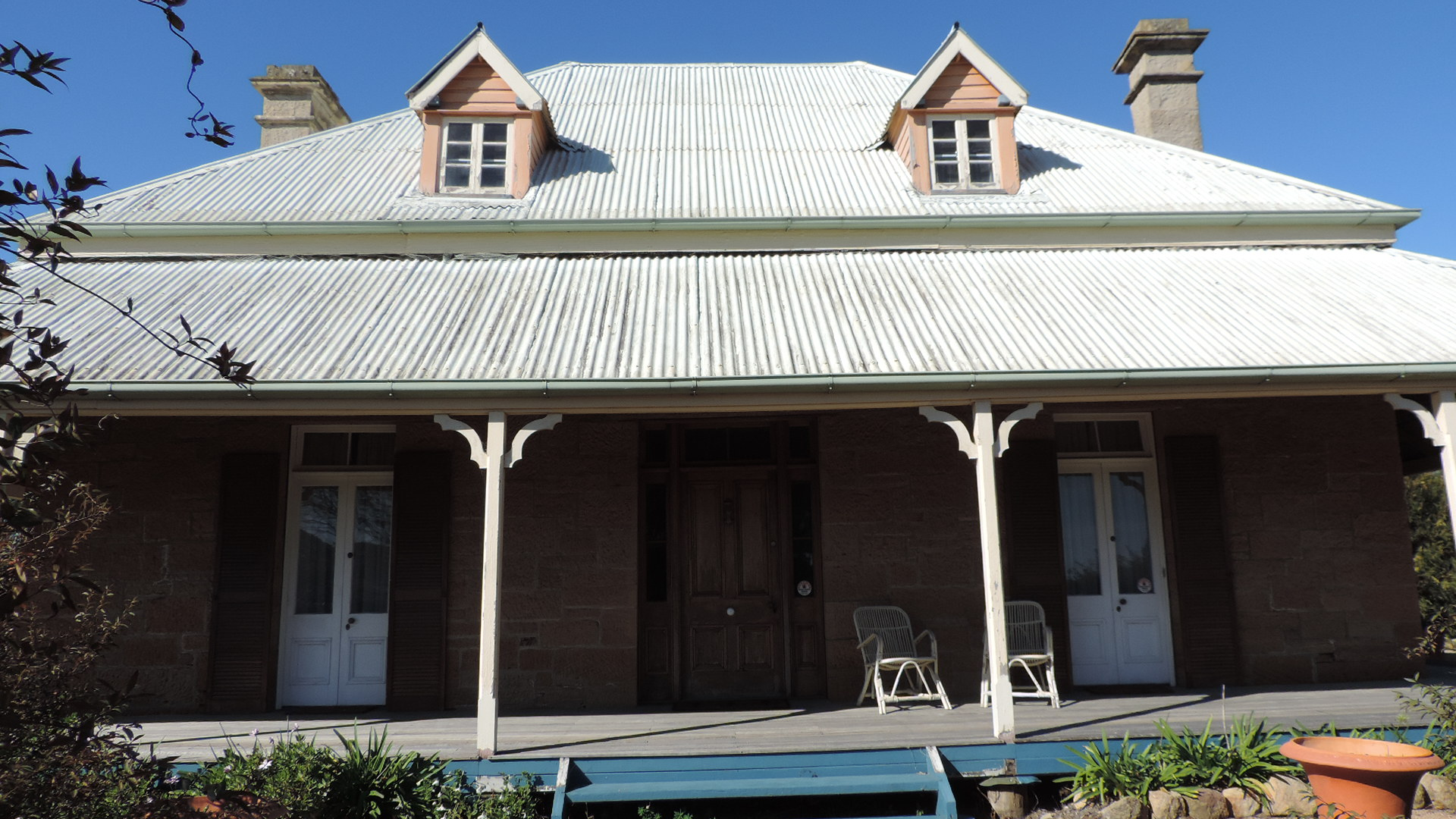
White Swan Inn, 2015

Swan Creek has a number of heritage-listed sites, including:

- Burndale, Cutmore's Road (28.2081°S 152.1525°E)
- White Swan Inn, Stephens Road (28.1990°S 152.1365°E)

== Education ==
There are no schools in Swan Creek. The nearest government primary schools are Yangan State School in neighbouring Yangan to the east, Freestone State School in neighbouring Freestone to the north, and Warwick East State School in Warwick to the west. The nearest government secondary school is Warwick State High School in Warwick.
