= Burndale, Swan Creek =

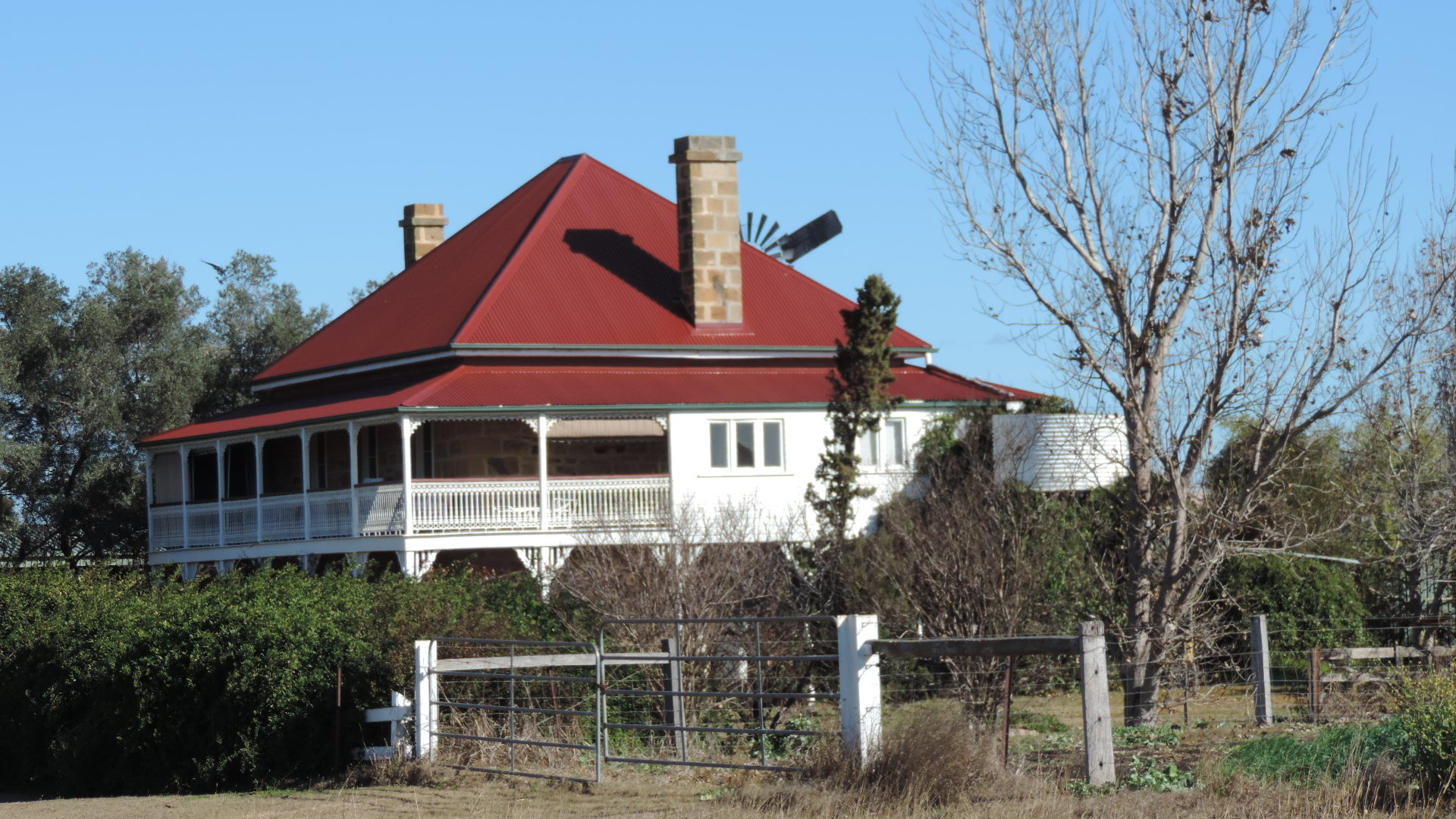
- Burndale, 2015

- Location within Queensland Location within Australia
- 28.2081°S 152.1525°E
- Location: Cutmore's Road, Swan Creek, Southern Downs Region, Queensland, Australia

History
- Design period: 1870s - 1890s (late 19th century)
- Built: c. 1876
- Built for: Timothy Murphy and Peter McGuckin

Queensland Heritage Register
- Official name: Burndale, Warrenilla
- Type: state heritage (landscape, built)
- Designated: 21 October 1992
- Reference no.: 600524
- Significant period: 1870s (fabric); 1860s-1870s (historical)
- Significant components: tank - water, residential accommodation - main house, tank stand, trees/plantings

Burndale is a heritage-listed detached house at Cutmore's Road, Swan Creek, Southern Downs Region, Queensland, Australia. It was built c. 1876. It is also known as Warrenilla. It was added to the Queensland Heritage Register on 21 October 1992.

== History ==
Burndale was built at Swan Creek, near Warwick, c. 1865 for Timothy Murphy and Peter McGuckin, early European occupants of the Swan Creek district.

The Swan Creek district, situated about 11 kilometres (6.8 mi) from Warwick, was known as the Agricultural Reserve and comprised a tract of fertile country wedged in between extensive pastoral holdings. Early settlers arriving at Swan Creek during the 1860s were successful in having the district surveyed and offered for sale in agricultural farm areas. The land on which Burndale stands originally comprised 38 acres (15 ha), and was selected under section 4 of the Agricultural Reserves Act 1863, the intent of which was to facilitate the acquisition of land for the purposes of agriculture.

Burndale was erected with the aim of obtaining a license and conducting the premises as a hotel. This intention never materialised, and Burndale has always been used as a private residence. Burndale was constructed of locally quarried sandstone, carted by John Deveney of Yangan.

McGuckin acquired the whole property and half the adjoining block in 1877. McGuckin was a keen horse racing enthusiast and established a racecourse on the property adjacent to his home. On race days the balcony of McGuckin's home which overlooked the racecourse, served as a grandstand for spectators to watch the racing events.

On McGuckin's death in 1883, the property was transferred to Samuel Cutmore, with whom McGuckin had taken out a mortgage on the property in 1878. The Cutmore family was another of the early European families in the area. Cutmore took out a number of subsequent mortgages on the property until his death in 1915, when the property passed to his children.

The property remained in the Cutmore family until 1974, when the property was acquired by Ian and Sarah McMaster, who changed the name of the property to Warrenilla. The present owners acquired the property in 1976, and it reverted to the former name of Burndale.

== Description ==
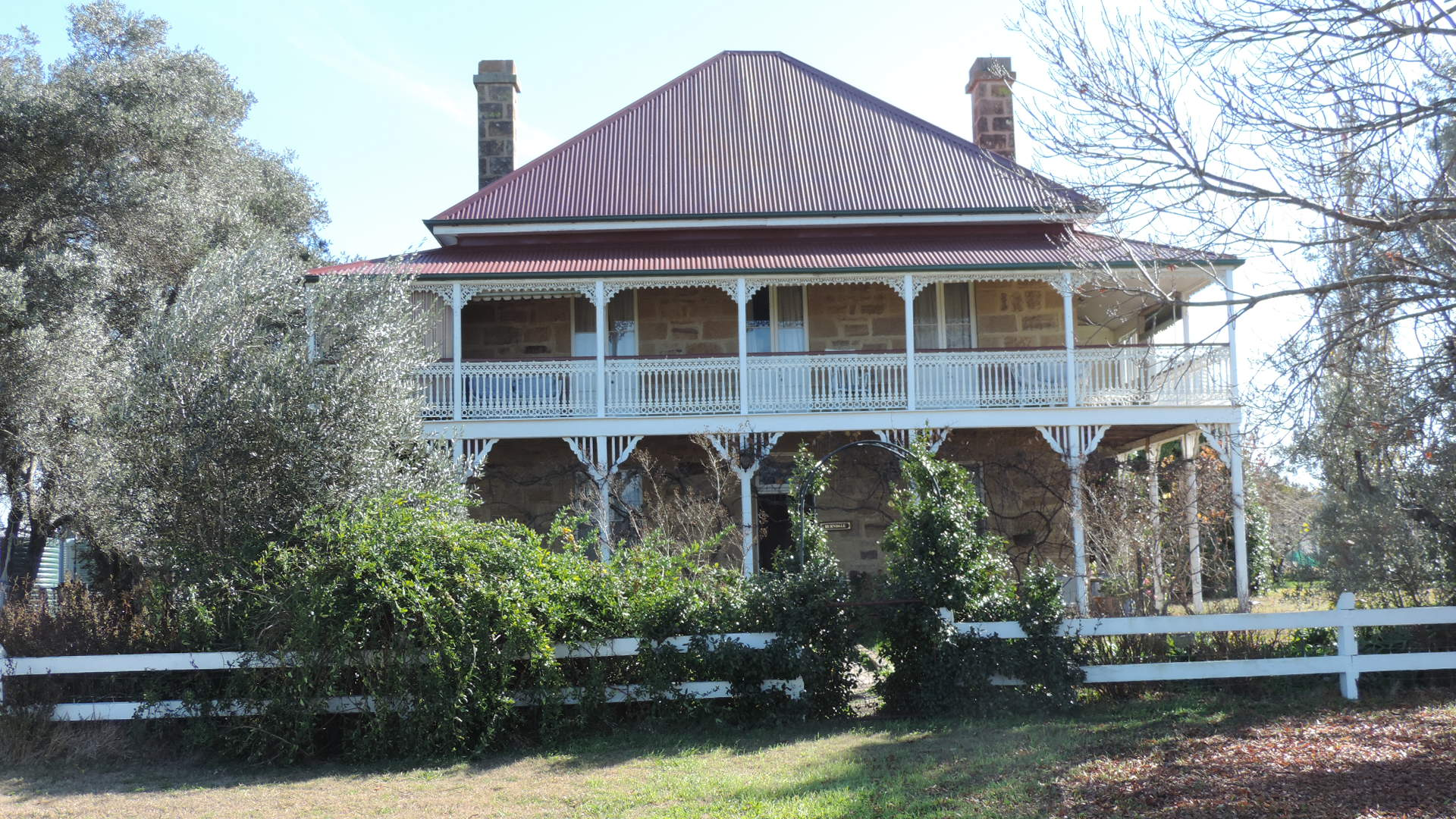
Burndale, front elevation, 2015

Burndale is a two-storeyed sandstone house with timber verandahs and a corrugated iron roof. It dominates a gently undulating, sparsely treed landscape, rising above a cluster of immediately surrounding trees. It has a simple square-shaped plan, with verandahs on all sides, shaded by a curved corrugated iron awning. A pyramid roof rises above the awning, with substantial brick chimneys to the north and the south. The verandahs have been enclosed with weatherboard to part of the northern elevation, all of the western elevation, and most of the southern elevation.

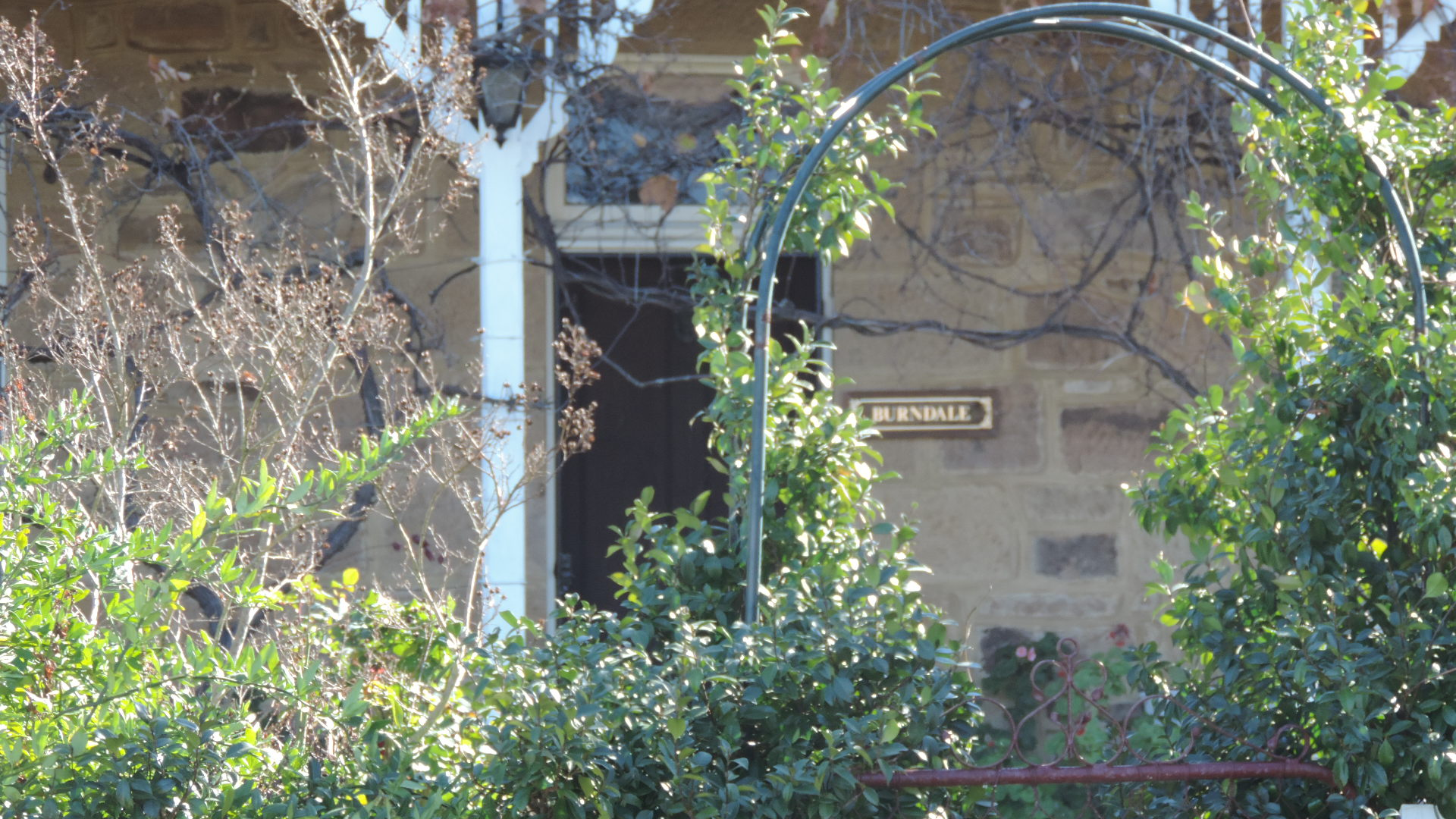
Closeup of the Burndale sign on the front of the house, 2015

The verandah is supported with chamfered square posts with shaped brackets and battened valances. The unenclosed sections of the verandah have cast iron balustrades and valances. Grape vines grow around the base of the house, on wires strung between the verandah posts.

The upper level has glazed timber French doors leading onto the verandah, the lower level has timber sliding sash windows and timber doors. The sandstone is square-snecked coursed, and has been recently repointed. The north-west corner of the house has a corrugated iron wash house incorporated into the base of a water tank on tall timber stumps.

The garden contains many mature trees, including olive trees fruit trees, cypress pines and a she-oak.

The building is an unusual example of a two-storeyed sandstone house, and the exterior is intact and in good condition.

== Heritage listing ==
Burndale was listed on the Queensland Heritage Register on 21 October 1992 having satisfied the following criteria.

The place is important in demonstrating the evolution or pattern of Queensland's history.

Burndale is important in demonstrating the pattern of Queensland's history, in particular the settlement of agricultural reserves in the Darling Downs area.

The place demonstrates rare, uncommon or endangered aspects of Queensland's cultural heritage.

As an example of an 1860s two-storeyed rural sandstone residence, Burndale demonstrates uncommon aspects of Queensland's heritage.

The place is important in demonstrating the principal characteristics of a particular class of cultural places.

Further, Burndale demonstrates the principal characteristics of a sandstone house in the Warwick district.

The place is important because of its aesthetic significance.

Burndale exhibits particular aesthetic characteristics valued by the community, in particular its contribution to the landscape of the Swan Creek district.

The place has a special association with the life or work of a particular person, group or organisation of importance in Queensland's history.

Burndale has special association with the McGuckin and Cutmore families, both early European residents of the Swan Creek district.
