= Hunmanby Market Cross =

Historic structure in Hunmanby, England

Coordinates: 54°10′49″N 0°19′21″W

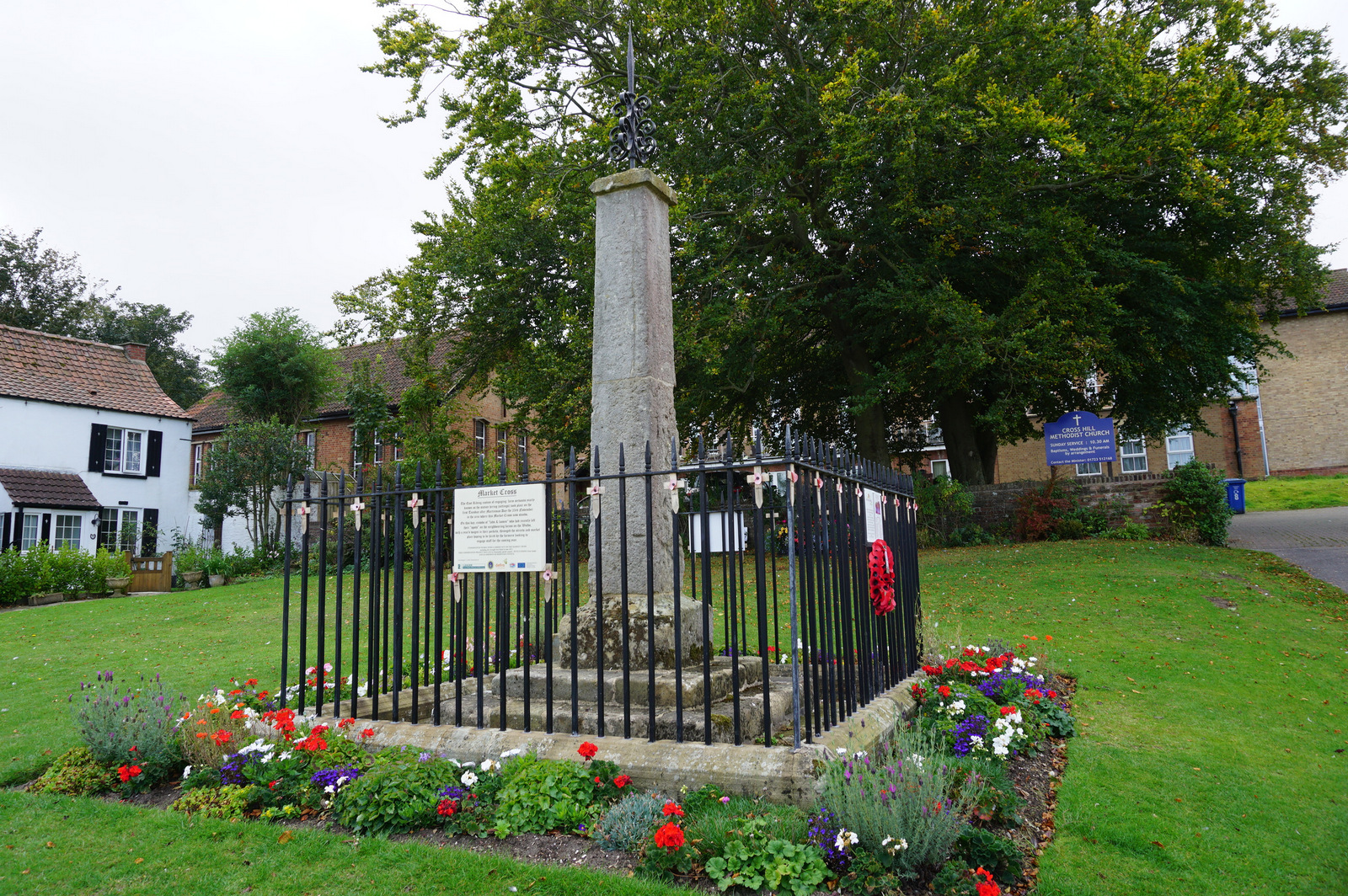
The cross, in 2018

Hunmanby Market Cross is a historic structure in Hunmanby, a village in North Yorkshire, in England.

There was a market in Hunmanby by 1241, when Gilbert de Gant complained that a new market in Filey was affecting its trade. The market cross was erected in the mediaeval period, although the exact period is unknown. The market ceased in the 18th century. The head of the cross is said to have fallen in 1860, and to have destroyed the neighbouring stocks. The shaft was later restored, and a decorative spearhead was inserted into the top of the remaining section. It was grade II listed in 1985.

The market cross stands in an enclosure on what is now Cross Hill. It is constructed of sandstone and consists of a tall tapering shaft on a chamfered plinth, on stone steps. The cross has a square plan and a shallow domed top and is surmounted by a decorated wrought iron spearhead.

== See also ==
- Listed buildings in Hunmanby
