= Hunmanby Hall =

Historic building in Hunmanby, England

Coordinates: 54.1802°N 0.3247°W

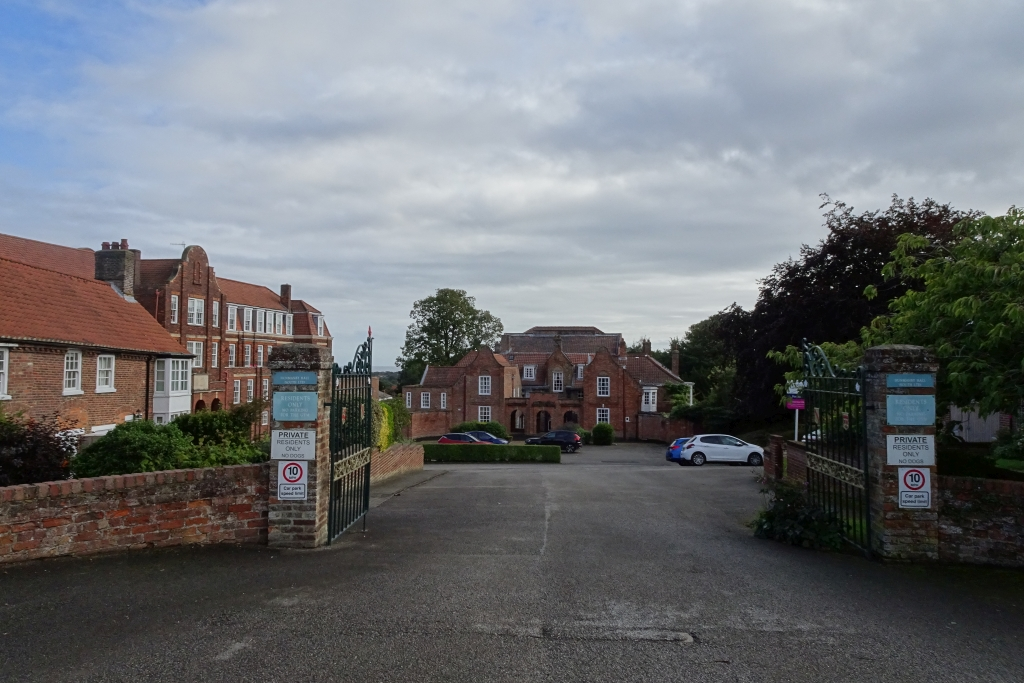
The building, in 2023

Hunmanby Hall is a historic building in Hunmanby, a village in North Yorkshire, in England.

The core of the building was constructed in the early 17th century, for Richard Osbaldeston. Later in the century, William Osbaldeston added a cross-wing to the hall, followed around 1700 by a second cross-wing, and the refronting of the whole building. The building was extended in the 19th century, and in the mid-1920s, an arcade was added to link the two crosswings on the west front.

In 1928, the house became a Methodist girls' boarding school. As part of the conversion, a dining hall was added to the east front, its facade being the relocated ground storey of the 18th century front. Many new buildings were constructed to its northwest, and the stable block was converted into classrooms. The school closed in 1991, and in 2005 it was converted into flats. The hall was grade II* listed in 1952.

The hall is built of red brick with sandstone dressings and a pantile roof. The main front has three storeys, three bays, and gabled cross-wings. The centre block has a chamfered plinth, floor and eaves cornice bands, quoins, a plain parapet, and a hipped roof. The windows are sashes with moulded stone sills and architraves with keystones, and the windows in the middle bay have segmental pediments. The entrance front has two storeys and an attic, three bays, and a three-bay arcade, behind which is a staircase tower, and the cross-wings have Dutch gables. Inside, the tower staircase is 17th century, while elsewhere there is an early 18th-century staircase and some panelling of similar date.

To the west of the hall is a grade II-listed mid 18th-century service block, later used for other purposes, including a period as the school's sick bay. It is built of orange-red brick on the front and right gable wall, and in chalk at the rear and left side. The right corner is canted with sandstone quoins, there is a stepped and dentilled eaves course, and a pantile roof with a tumbled brick left gable. The building has two storeys and ten bays. Most of the original openings have been altered, most contain sash windows, some horizontally-sliding, and in the right bay is a two-storey square bay window.

The mid-18th century stable block is built of red brick with a modillion eaves course under a course of moulded terracotta and a flat brick parapet. There are two storeys and five bays, the middle three bays projecting and containing a three-bay blind arcade of round-headed arches with imposts on plain pilasters. In the centre is a doorway with a fanlight, the windows are sashes, and all the openings have flat gauged brick arches. It is grade II listed.

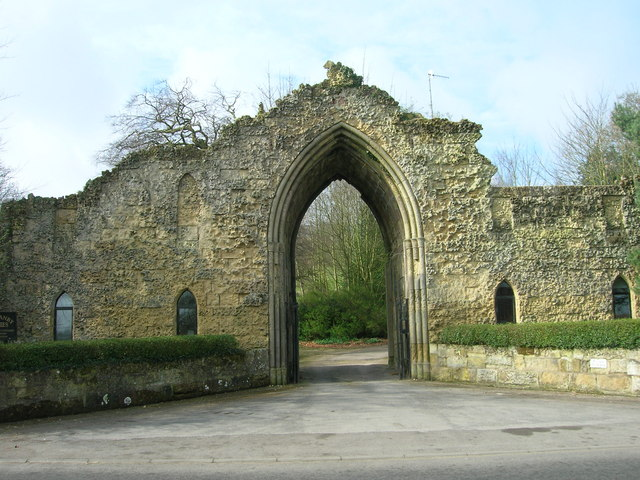
The gateway and lodges

The grade II-listed gateway to the hall was built in 1829. It is in vermiculated sandstone, and consists of a ruined Gothic arch, flanked by two-bay lodges. The arch is tall and pointed, with three orders and two storeys. In the walls are lancet windows, and the arch contains iron-studded doors, and shaped iron gates with painted iron armorial plaques.

== See also ==
- Grade II* listed buildings in North Yorkshire (district)
- Listed buildings in Hunmanby
