= VSNL Northern Europe =

Underwater cable system

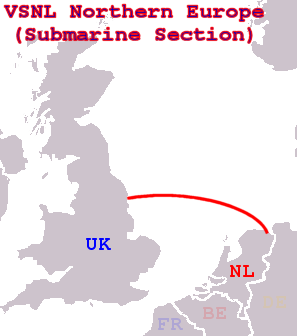

VSNL Northern Europe (previously TGN Northern Europe) is a telecommunications cable system with both submarine and terrestrial parts, connecting England and the Netherlands.

The submarine portion of the system runs for 562 km, and is constructed from cable containing four fibre pairs, utilising eight repeaters. Each fibre pair was commissioned to support sixty-four 10 Gbit/s wavelengths at construction, allowing for a total capacity of four fibre pairs at 640 Gbit/s each, or 2,560 Gbit/s in total.

The cable system's submarine portions have landing points in facilities near:

- Hunmanby, England, United Kingdom
- Eemshaven, Netherlands

And are further extended inland by a terrestrial systems to:

- Stratford, United Kingdom
- Groningen, Netherlands
- Amsterdam Science Park, Netherlands

In April 2016, Tata Communications (née VSNL) reputedly sold the entire cable system (including inland points of presence and co-location facilities) to a company trading as UnitedNet Ltd in the United Kingdom, however no publication of the sale has been made.

UnitedNet claim that the cable system is capable of operating at 100 Gbit/s per wavelength currently, with 400 Gbit/s speeds achievable following future upgrades.
