= White Swan, Hunmanby =

Pub in Hunmanby, North Yorkshire, England

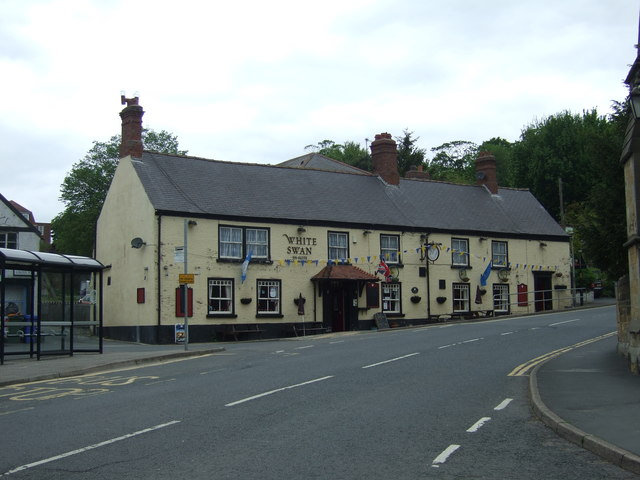
The pub, in 2015

The White Swan is a historic pub in Hunmanby, a village in North Yorkshire, in England.

The inn was constructed in the late 18th century, and it was extended and altered in the 19th century. It was threatened with closure and conversion into housing in the early 2010s, but following a public inquiry, in 2016 it was purchased by a new owner who ran it as a free house. The pub has been grade II listed since 1985.

The pub is built of whitewashed brick with a stepped brick eaves course and a slate roof. It has two storeys and six bays. On the front are two doorways with panelled pilasters, one with a gabled porch, and the other with a cornice, and the windows are sashes.

== See also ==
- Listed buildings in Hunmanby
