= Solardome =

British Glass Geodesic Dome Manufacturer

Solardome Industries Limited
- Company type: Limited Company
- Founded: 1995
- Headquarters: Southampton, United Kingdom
- Area served: Worldwide
- Website: www.solardome.co.uk

Solardome Industries Limited (shortened to Solardome) is a UK manufacturer of glass geodesic domes.

The original greenhouse was an offshoot of the 1960s NATO developed early warning radar system. The Buckminster Fuller organisation designed and develop giant "golf ball" radar domes. In Europe, these were placed in Fylingdales, North Yorkshire.

These giant domes had to withstand extremes of wind and storm and yet remain unaffected. An ex German U-boat engineer, Hans Lemke, living in Hunmanby North Yorkshire was fascinated by these domes and thought, "If they can withstand these weather conditions then they would make an ideal domestic garden building, greenhouse or garden conservatory". He explored the Buckminster Fuller Geodesic domes and their principles and then designed and manufactured the first European domestic Geodesic dome, a 14' 6" Solardome.

The first glasshouse was produced in 1969 and production continues to this day, although not in Hunmanby.

== Media ==
In 2012 a Solardome glasshouse was included as part of a project to improve facilities at The Yard, as featured on the BBC One "Big Build Children in Need Special" programme.
