= White Swan Inn, Swan Creek =

Historic building in Queensland, Australia

White Swan Inn
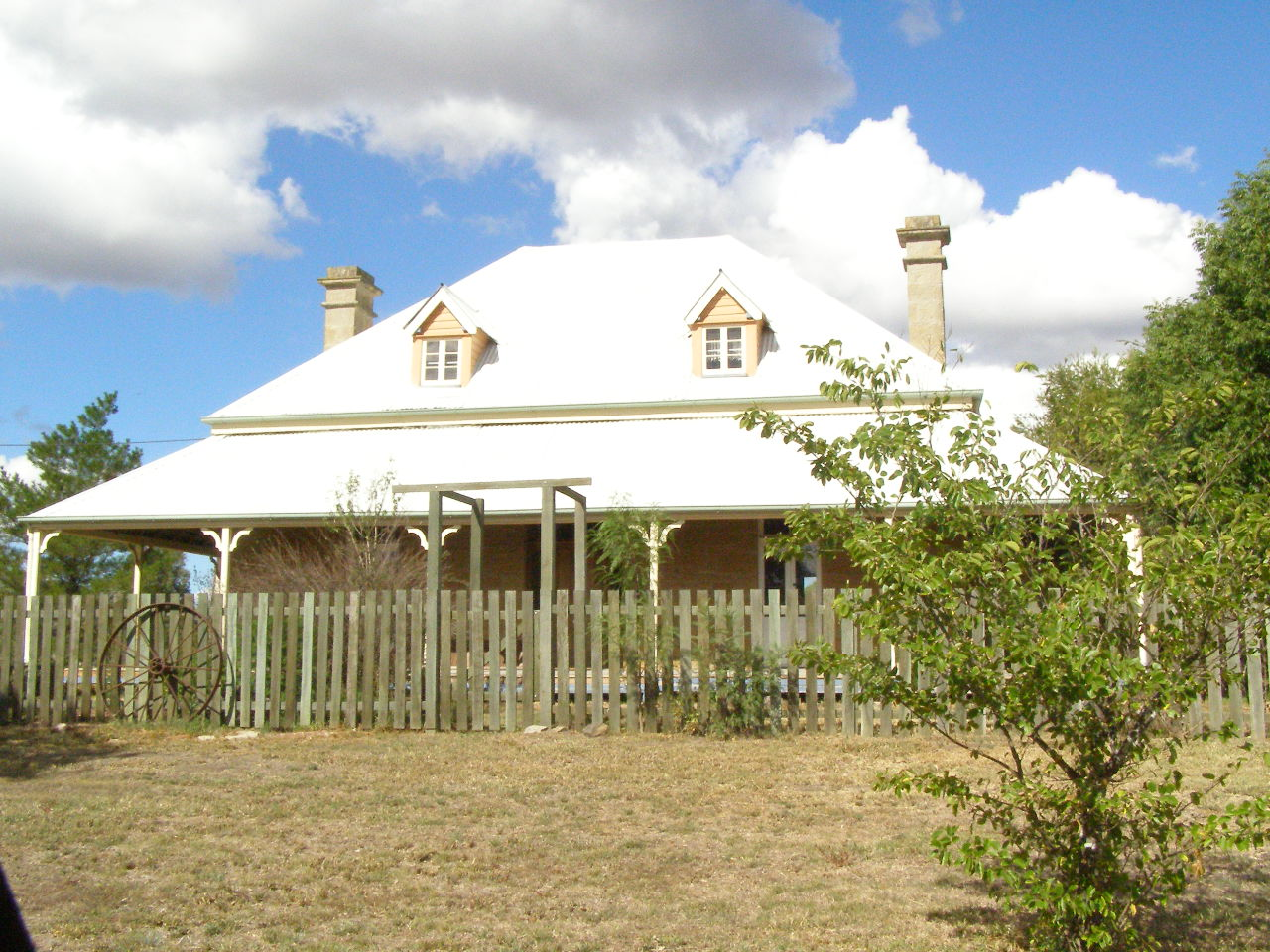
- White Swan Inn, 2007

- Location within Queensland Location within Australia
- 28.199°S 152.1365°E
- Location: Stevens Road, Swan Creek, Southern Downs Region, Queensland, Australia

History
- Design period: 1870s - 1890s (late 19th century)
- Built: c. 1876

Queensland Heritage Register
- Official name: White Swan Inn (former), White Swan Inn
- Type: state heritage (archaeological, built)
- Designated: 21 October 1992
- Reference no.: 600523
- Significant period: 1870s (fabric) c. 1878-1887 (historical use as an Inn)
- Significant components: attic

White Swan Inn is a heritage-listed former hotel, now a detached house, at Stevens Road, Swan Creek, Southern Downs Region, Queensland, Australia. It was built c. 1876. It was added to the Queensland Heritage Register on 21 October 1992.

== History ==
The former White Swan Inn was built at Swan Creek in about 1876 as the residence of local farmer Edward Malone. Shortly after its construction the residence became a hotel, known as the White Swan Inn though it remained in this use for only ten years before becoming a residence again.

The Swan Creek district, situated about 11 kilometres (6.8 mi) from Warwick, was known as the Agricultural Reserve and comprised a tract of fertile country wedged between extensive pastoral holdings. Early settlers arriving in Swan Creek during the 1860s were successful in having the district surveyed and offered for sale in agricultural farm areas. 18 acres of the Warwick Agricultural Reserve, being portion 284, was granted to Joseph Thomas Wilson in May 1868 and it is on this land that the White Swan Inn was later built.

According to the titles information on the property, subdivisions 1 and 3 were transferred to Edward Malone by January 1880. However, it seems that the land was in Malone's possession many years prior to this. A roving correspondent for The Queenslander visited Swan Creek in 1876 and published descriptions of the area in several editions of the newspaper during October of that year in a series titled, Farming on the Darling Downs. The series has a description of a farm owned by Mr Edward Malone, who, at the time of the article was having some difficulties with his neighbour, a Mr Hughes, over road reserves and access for cattle.

The property owned by Edward Malone is described as 75 acres, of which 32 acres were under wheat cultivation. The correspondent noted that Malone was in the process of constructing a stone house on his property near an adjoining Church of England property. This house would appear to be the building known as the White Swan Inn today, which is situated alongside a former Church of England. Another mention of the house appears in an historical survey of the Swan Creek area published in the Warwick Daily News of September 1945. This talks about the White Swan Inn which was built as the residence of Edward Malone in about 1880, but after its construction became used as an hotel, namely the White Swan Inn, when Malone transferred his business from farmer to that of publican. A license was issued by the Licensing Court for a hotel at the White Swan Inn in 1878 though the publican's name is not mentioned. Early photographs of the White Swan Inn show a building much as it appears today, a single storeyed sandstone residence with shingled roof pierced by dormer windows.

Subdivision 3, on which the White Swan Inn was erected, was transferred from Malone to Matthew O'Sullivan in July 1884 and it seems the White Swan Inn continued to operate. According to the Warwick Daily News' article of 1945 was managed by a Mr Ravenscroft. On Matthew O'Sullivan's death on 24 February 1885 the estate was transferred to his widow, Mary Francis. In December 1887 Subdivision 3 was transferred to Bernard Hughes who returned the building to the former use of private residence. The house remained in the Hughes family until May 1872 when it was transferred to Colin and Edna Tyson.

By 1878 the Tysons implemented a building programme at their new home, which included the addition of a kitchen and living area at the rear of the house. Internally much work was undertaken during the Tysons stay in the house, including the realignment of internal stairs and the internal re-arrangement of the attic. In January 1989 the property was transferred to Neil and Donna Lomas and in March 1992 was transferred to Donna Lomas solely.

In September 2010, the property was sold to a Brisbane couple.

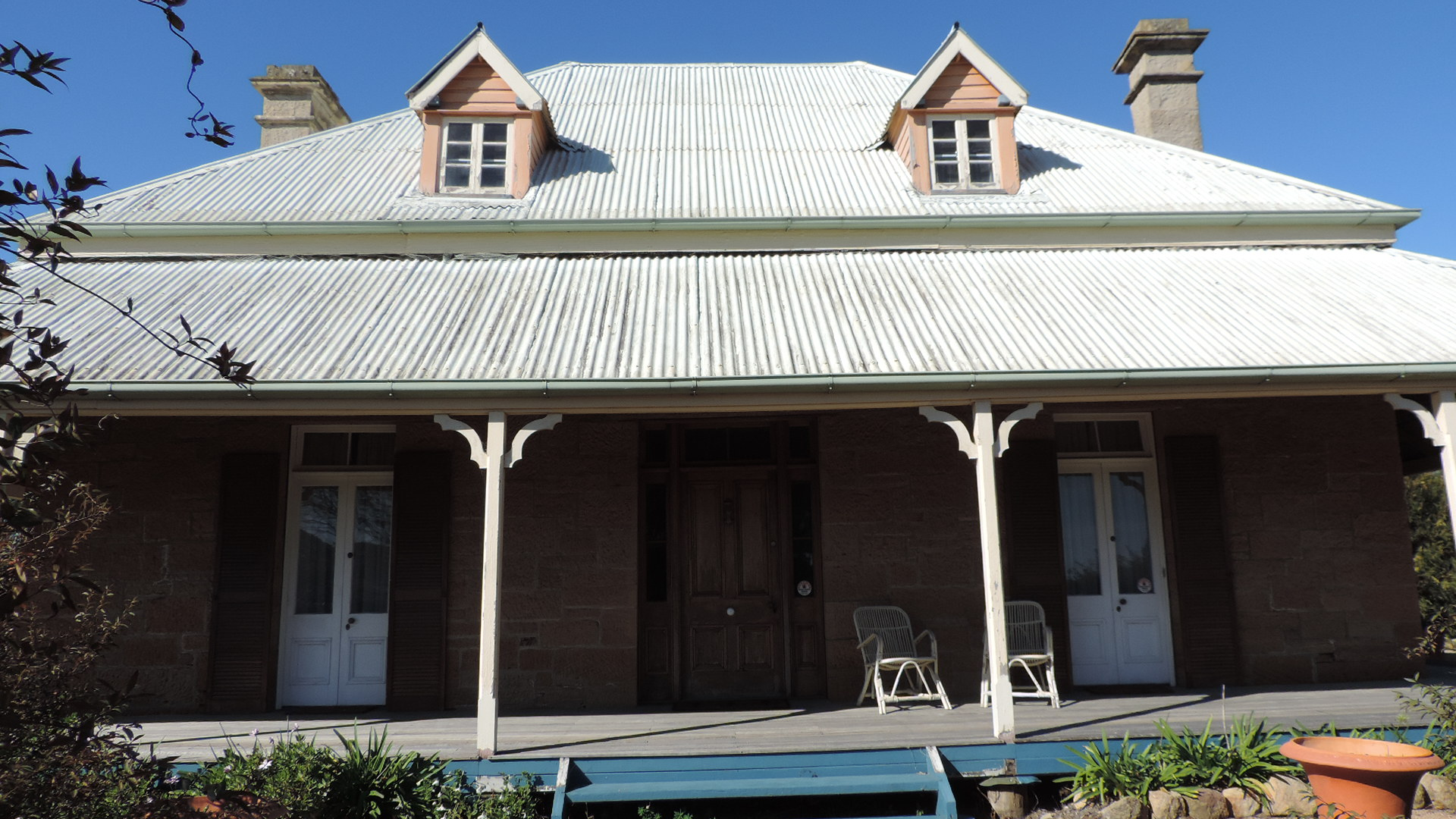
Front elevation, 2015

== Description ==
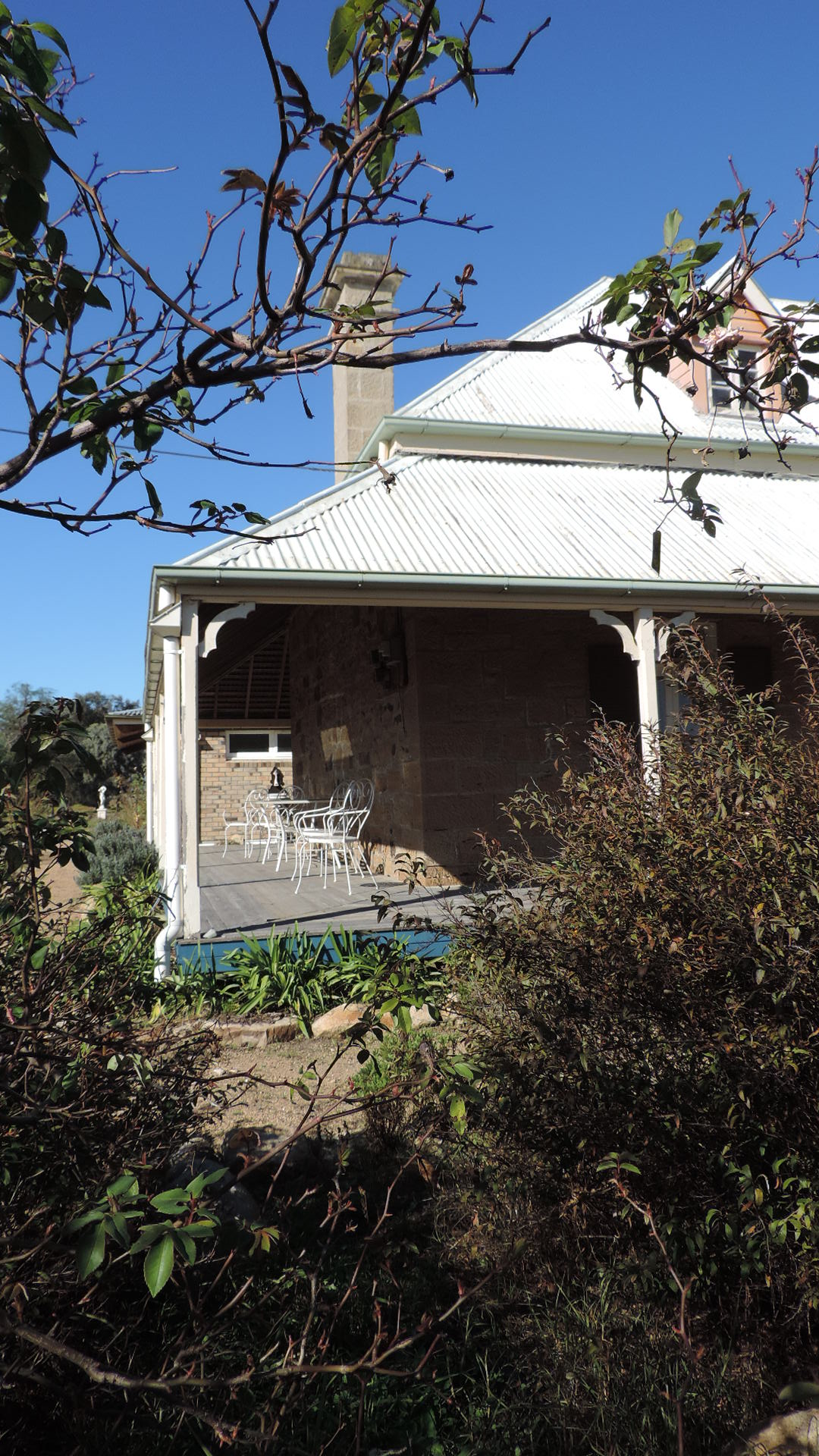
Side verandah, 2015

The White Swan Inn is a one-storeyed building with a substantial attic above. It is constructed mainly of tooled sandstone laid in a coursed random pattern with has a corrugated iron hipped roof. The building is surrounded by a simply detailed verandah which sits on low stumps. The verandah roof is supported by timber posts and the soffit reveals battening for shingles though these have been replaced with corrugated iron sheeting.

The exterior of the building is symmetrical in appearance. Timber steps to the verandah are centrally located in front of the main entrance door which is flanked by French doors. These replace the original inward opening single doors which are currently stored in the garage. Dormer windows with weatherboard sidings are located within the hipped roof at both the front and rear of the building, and align with the French doors below. Stone chimney shafts with moulded corbelling are situated at either end of the building.

The symmetrically arranged interior is divided by a central hallway from the front door, and which incorporates a narrow stair leading to the attic at the rear. High quality timber doors of varying sizes open from the hallway into the three ground floor rooms. The two rooms on the northern side are of similar proportions and detailing with plaster walls and a ceiling of wide beaded boards. The room on the southern side of the building appears to have had a central dividing wall which has since been removed to create one large room. This room has plaster walls and ceilings. The rooms have chimneypieces with early over-mantles excepting the one in the room at the north-east corner. Both the large room and the smaller front room have French doors that open onto the verandah. All rooms have timber skirtings and simply moulded cornices.

The staircase is a reconstruction of the original and leads to an upstairs area which is divided into three rooms and a hallway. The hallway is lined with 300 millimetres (12 in) (approx) wide pine boards. The original shingle roof of the building survives under the corrugated iron. The external walls of the building project approximately 1 metre (3 ft 3 in) above the first floor level. Above these, plaster walls taper to meet a plaster ceiling both of which are divided by exposed timber rafters and collar ties.

A new addition of timber and brick has been built at the rear of the house and is joined to the original house at the end of the hallway. Near this new addition stands a brick fireplace, probably from the original kitchen building which no longer exists.

== Heritage listing ==
The White Swan Inn was listed on the Queensland Heritage Register on 21 October 1992 having satisfied the following criteria.

The place is important in demonstrating the evolution or pattern of Queensland's history.

The former White Swan Inn is important in demonstrating the development of Swan Creek which was in an area formerly set aside as an Agricultural Reserve. The former White Swan Inn demonstrates the principal characteristics of a small sandstone house in Queensland, particularly of those constructed in the nineteenth century in and around Warwick.

The place is important because of its aesthetic significance.

The building contributes to the Swan Creek area where it is a prominent feature of a flat and sparse landscape. The residence is picturesquely situated and of aesthetic value.

The place has a special association with the life or work of a particular person, group or organisation of importance in Queensland's history.

The White Swan Inn has special associations with JT Wilson and Edward Malone, early European residents of the area.
