= Hunmanby =

Village and civil parish in North Yorkshire, England

Coordinates: 54°10′53″N 0°19′03″W

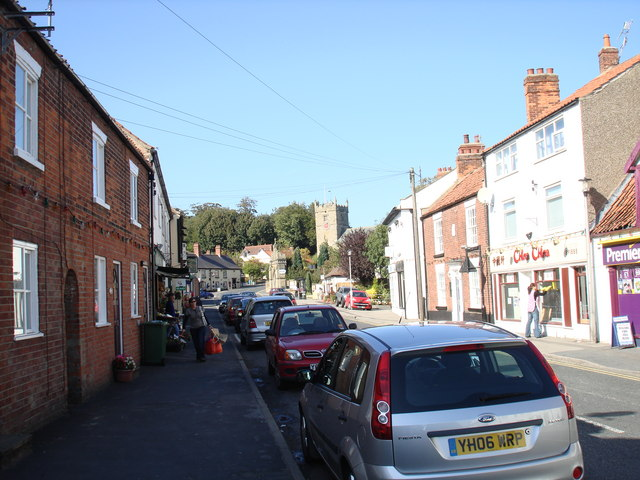
- Bridlington Street, Hunmanby

- Location within North Yorkshire
- Population: 3,132 (2011 census)
- OS grid reference: TA099775
- Civil parish: Hunmanby
- Unitary authority: North Yorkshire
- Ceremonial county: North Yorkshire
- Region: Yorkshire and the Humber
- Country: England
- Sovereign state: United Kingdom
- Post town: FILEY
- Postcode district: YO14
- Police: North Yorkshire
- Fire: North Yorkshire
- Ambulance: Yorkshire
- UK Parliament: Thirsk and Malton

Hunmanby is a large village and civil parish in North Yorkshire, England. It was part of the East Riding of Yorkshire until 1974. From 1974 to 2023 it was in the Scarborough district of the shire county of North Yorkshire. In 2023 the district was abolished and North Yorkshire became a unitary authority. It is on the edge of the Yorkshire Wolds, 3 miles (4.8 km) south-west of Filey, 9 miles (14 km) south of Scarborough and 9 miles (14 km) north of Bridlington. The village is on the Centenary Way.

At the 2011 census, Hunmanby had a population of 3,132.

Hunmanby railway station is on the Yorkshire Coast Line between Hull and Scarborough.

== History ==
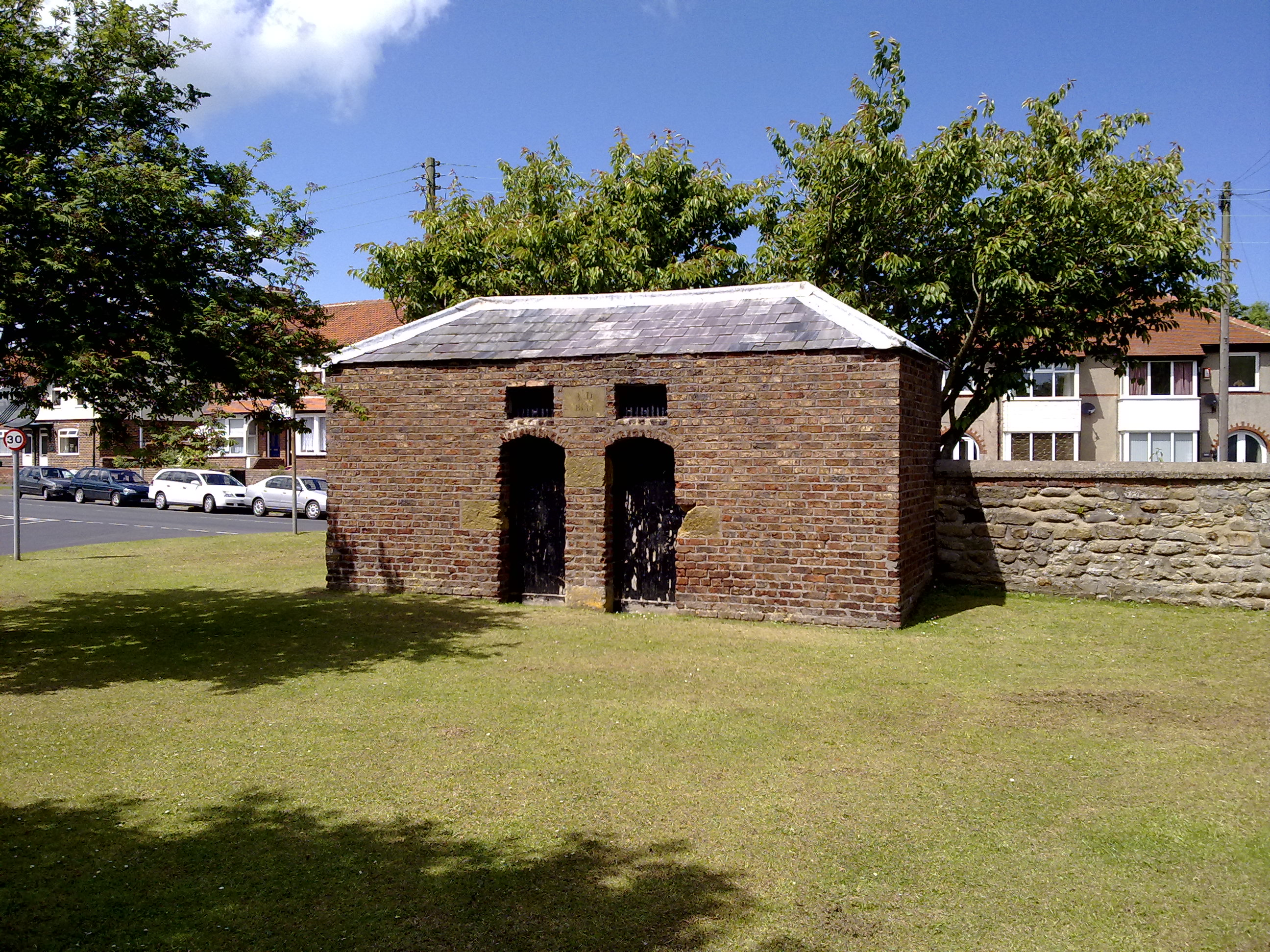
The village lock-up on Stonegate

The village's name of Hunmanby originated with the Danes, appearing in King William's Domesday Book (published in 1086) as 'Hundemanbi' meaning 'farmstead of the hounds men', relating to the hunting down of wolves on the Yorkshire Wolds.

Evidence exists showing that Hunmanby was occupied by much earlier people than the Danes. A landslip occurred in 1907 revealing a British chariot burial site from the 1st or 2nd century BC, in which a chariot was buried horse and all. A tumulus on a local farm was opened up to reveal an ancient burial site containing 15 skeletons. Roman pottery and flint axe and arrowheads are frequently found in and around Hunmanby.

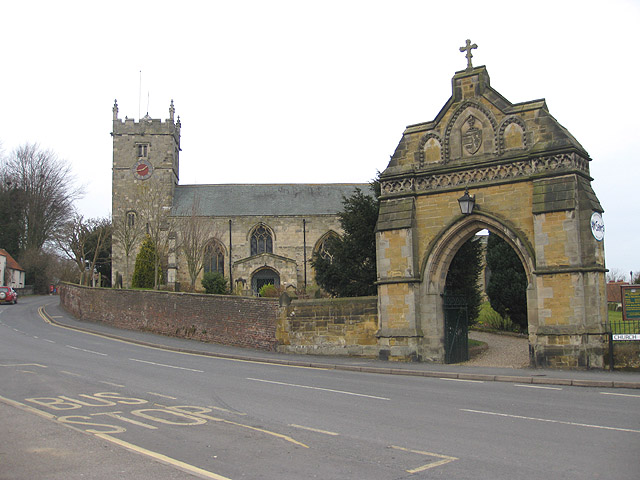
All Saints Church & Admiral's Arch

Given by William the Conqueror to Gilbert de Gant, De Gant lived in a house "without the town" named Le Burlyn (Old French for wool house), regarded to be built on the site where now stands Low Hall, the manor of Hunmanby became one of the most powerful in the North of England. His son Walter founded Bridlington Priory. Hunmanby was the site of a castle (fortress in some descriptions) which was built by Gilbert de Gant. It was destroyed during the Battle of Hunmanby by William le Gros (the Earl of York) and the Constable of Chester, Eustace fitz John during a period of history known as The Anarchy. The site of the castle is now known as Castle Hill.

The manor changed hands through the centuries many times the manor maintained its importance until the end of the 19th century, when the hereditary Lords of the Manor sold the estate piece by piece. The manor belonged from the 1620s to the 1830s to the Osbaldestons, a branch of a prominent Lancashire family; the most notable member of the family was Richard Osbaldeston, Bishop of London 1762–64. The manor passed by inheritance to the Mitford family, of whom the most notable was the novelist Bertram Mitford.

It was the main market town for the East Riding of Yorkshire, and Hunmanby Market Cross survives. It is said to be the last place in England where King Stephen kept his wolfhounds. It has a number of important buildings including Low Hall. The original hall, which dates from the 11th century, and Hunmanby Hall, a Queen Anne era building erected to replace the original hall on a more elevated site. The lodge and gateway to the hall were built using stones taken from Filey Brigg.

After the death of Lord Nunburnholme in the early part of the 19th century, the Hall was bought by the Methodist Education Committee and re-opened in April 1928 as a boarding school for girls. The school closed in 1991 and could take up to 300 girls. The site is now home to a nine-hole golf course.

All Saints' Church is partly 12th century (though it is believed a Saxon church stood on the site before the present one). It was renovated in 1845 and is now grade II* listed.

== Transport ==
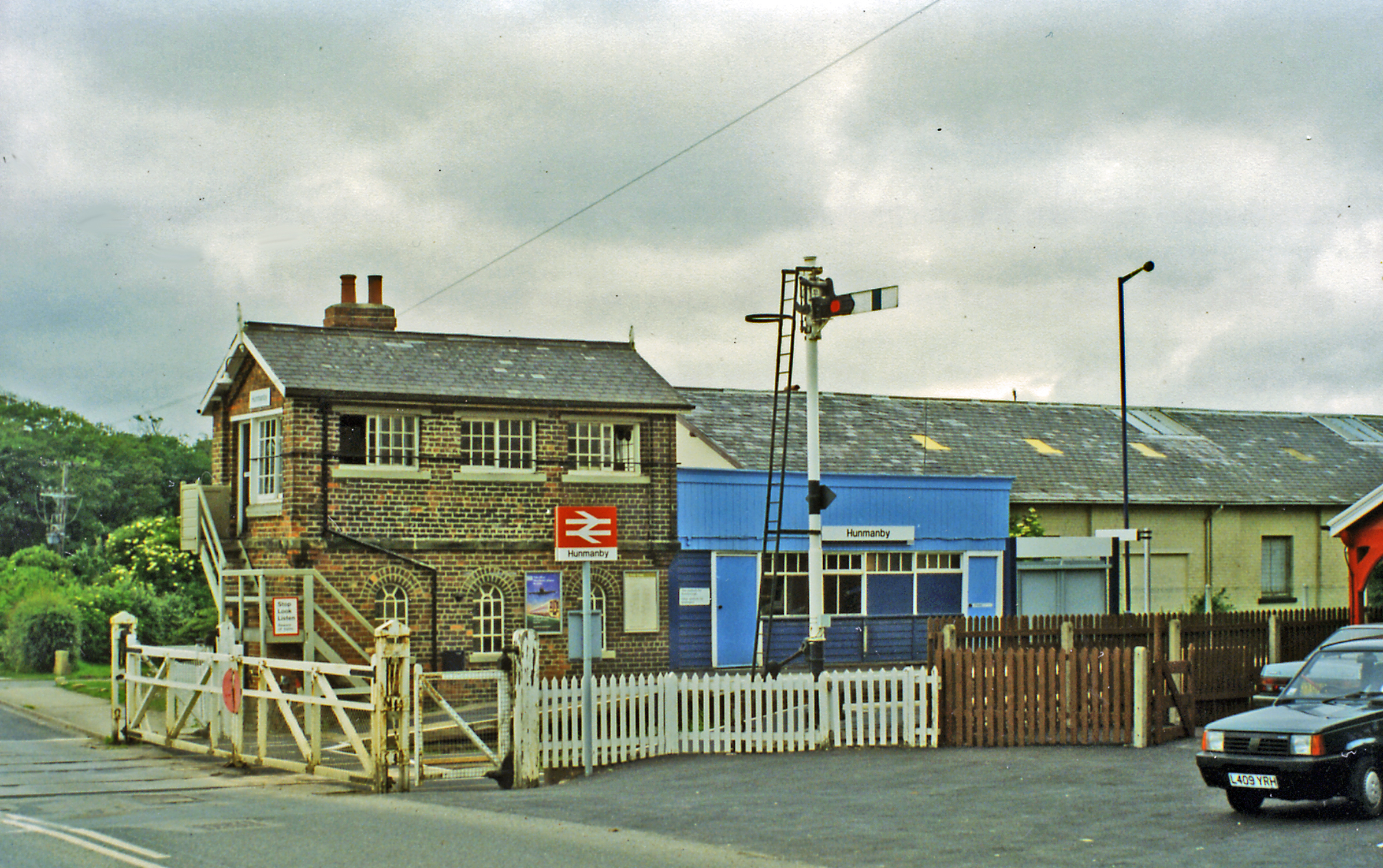
Hunmanby Railway station

Hunmanby used to be on the main coaching road between Scarborough and Hull. The A165 road bypasses the village by a 1 mile (1 km) to the east. The village is served by an hourly bus service between Bridlington and Scarborough with a one-day stopping coach service between Scarborough and London serving a holiday park to the east on the A165 at Hunmanby Moor.

The holiday park at Hunmanby Moor used to be the Filey Butlin's resort. This had its own spur railway from the railway line between Scarborough and Hull (now the Yorkshire Coast Line). Whilst the railway to the holiday park closed down in 1977. A railway station has been located at Hunmanby since October 1847 when the line first opened. Services are hourly between Hull and Scarborough each way, with the station being on an isolated two track section on a largely single line between Bridlington and Seamer.

== Today ==
Hunmanby has a number of businesses located within the village, despite its small size. These include Deep Sea Electronics, Cirrus Research Plc, Hunprenco, Peninsula Group, Barcodereaders.com, the Apollo Group and the Beck Engineering Group. In 2017 Yorkshire's first whisky distillery was opened on Hunmanby Industrial Estate by the owners of the nearby Wold Top Brewery.

The dinosaurs for Blackgang Chine on the Isle of Wight were manufactured in Hunmanby by Beck Engineering and featured on the television series Blue Peter. Historically it was the home of the Solar Dome greenhouse company, who made an unusual geodetic dome-shaped greenhouse and also had one of only two car manufacturers in Yorkshire in 1911.

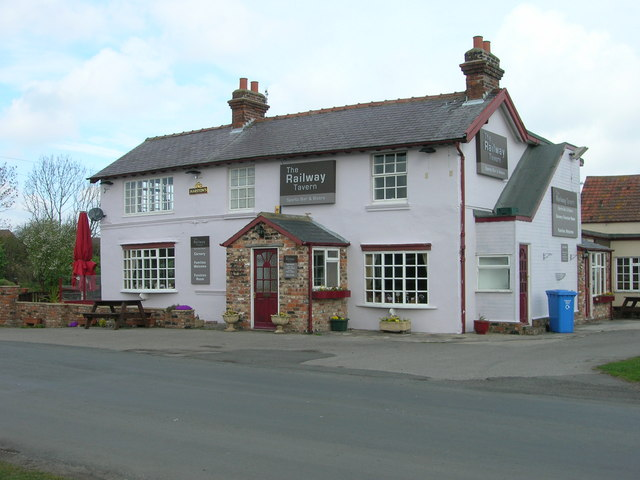
The Railway Tavern pub

Hunmanby is also the location of a television transmitter which acts as a local relay filler for Filey, Bridlington and the surrounding villages which are unable to receive transmissions from Oliver's Mount and Belmont. It also is a terminal for the VSNL Northern Europe submarine telecommunications cable connecting with De Marne in the Netherlands.

In 2010, Hunmanby won a Silver-gilt at the Britain in Bloom awards, this was the first time the village had entered the competition.

There is also an autograss track just outside the village. In 2018, actress and radio presenter Roxanne Pallett crashed whilst racing at the site.

Hunmanby is home to Hunmanby FC, an amateur football club founded in 2025. They won promotion from the East Riding County League Division Five in the 2025–26 season.

Former sports clubs in the village include Hunmanby United Football Club & Hunmanby Cricket Club.

== See also ==
- Hunmanby railway station
- People from Hunmanby
- RAF Hunmanby Moor
