= Dirt track racing in the United Kingdom =

Dirt track racing is a type of auto racing performed on oval tracks throughout the United Kingdom. Dirt ovals outnumber all other types of tracks combined. Tracks are also used for the motorcycle sport Speedway and other Track racing events.

== See also ==
- Hednesford Hills Raceway
- Odsal Stadium
