= The White Swan, Covent Garden =

Pub in Covent Garden, London

The White Swan
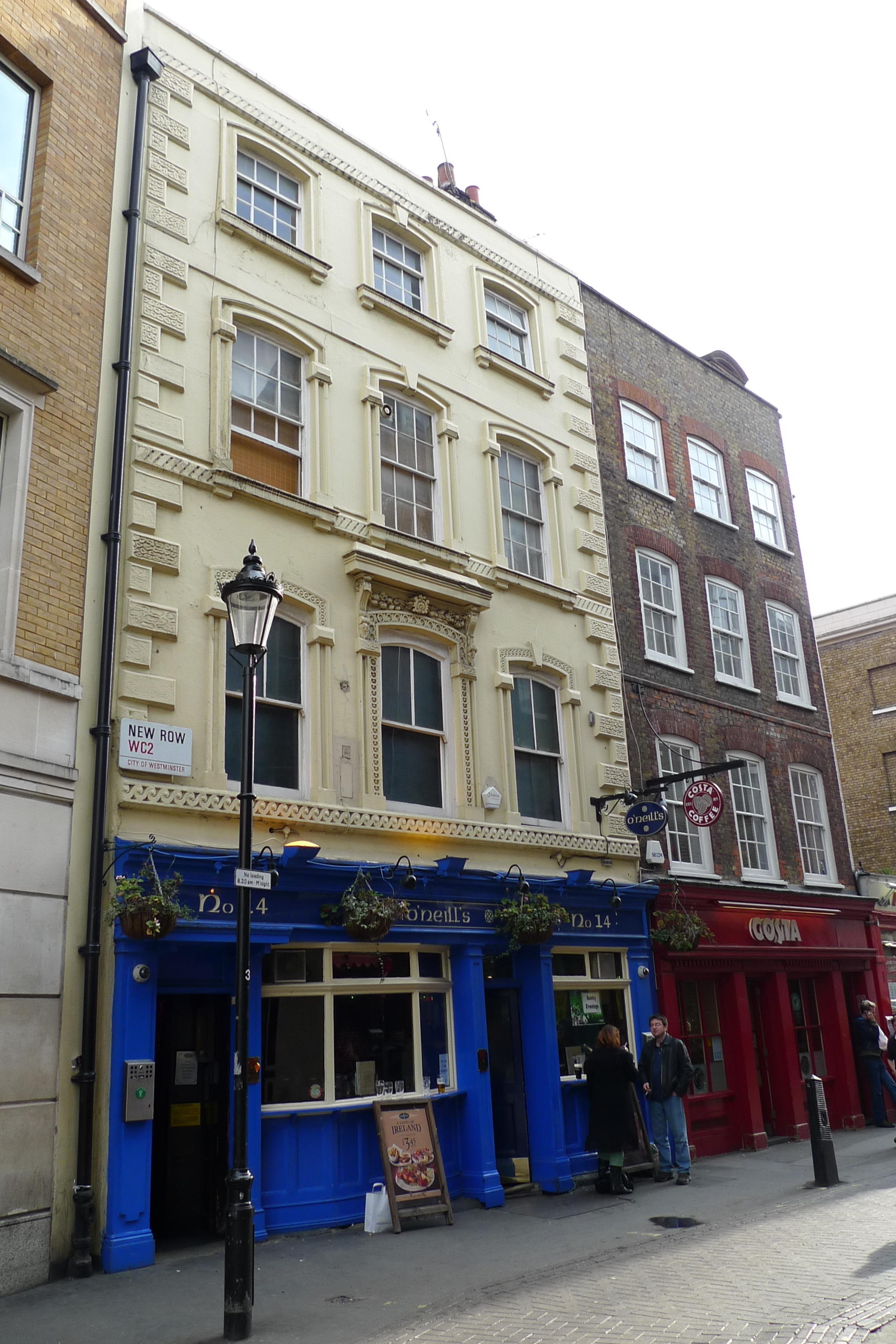
- The White Swan
- Type: Public house
- Location: 14 New Row, Covent Garden, London, WC2
- Coordinates: 51°30′39.65″N 0°7′32.17″W

Listed Building – Grade II
- Official name: WHITE SWAN PUBLIC HOUSE
- Designated: 15-Jan-1973
- Reference no.: 1224986

The White Swan is a Grade II listed public house at 14 New Row, Covent Garden, London, WC2.

It was built in the late 17th or early 18th century, refaced and altered mid-19th century. It was an O'Neill's pub, but has now reverted to its original name and is run by Nicholsons.
