= The White Swan, Twickenham =

Pub in Twickenham, London

Coordinates: 51°26′49″N 0°19′17″W

The White Swan
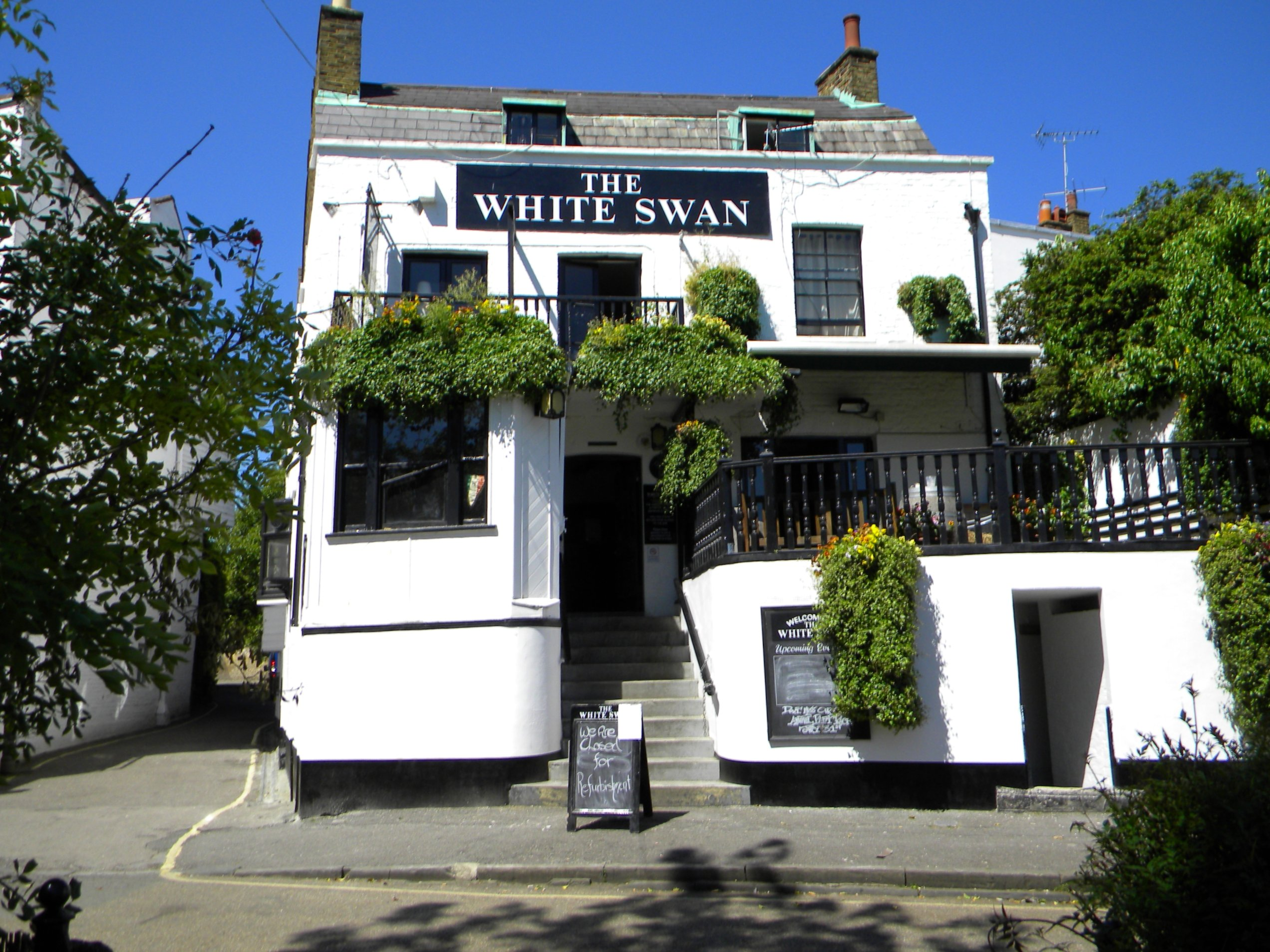

- Location within London Borough of Richmond upon Thames

General information
- Type: Public house
- Location: Riverside, Twickenham TW1 3DN in the London Borough of Richmond upon Thames

Listed Building – Grade II
- Official name: White Swan Inn, Riverside
- Designated: 2 September 1952
- Reference no.: 1250319

The White Swan is a Grade II listed public house at Twickenham Riverside in the London Borough of Richmond upon Thames.

It was built in the 18th century, and the architect is not known. It has a beer garden near the river, whose path to the pub is affected by floods.
