= St Augustine's Anglican Church, Leyburn =

St Augustines Anglican Church, Leyburn
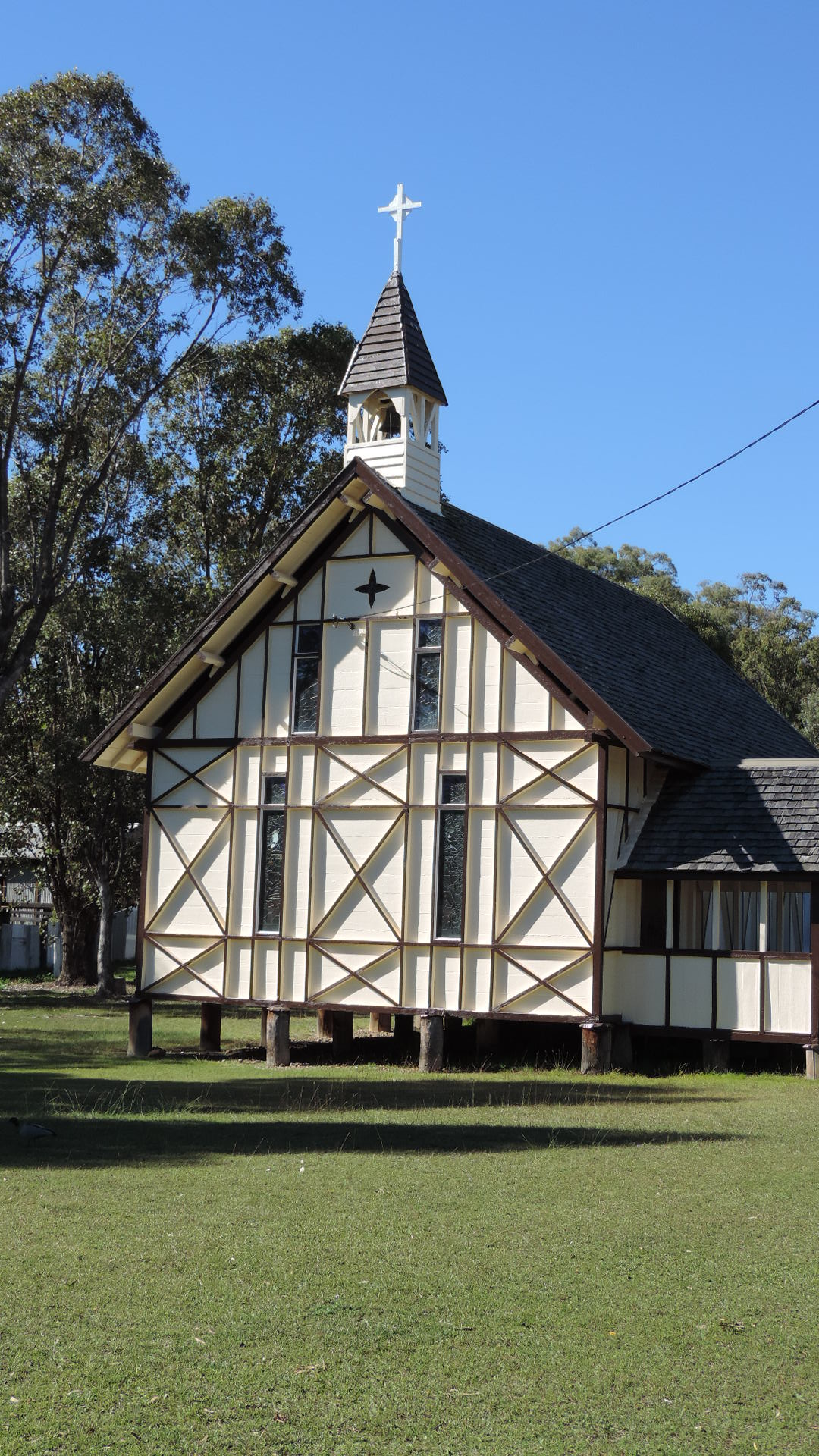
- St Augustines Anglican Church, Leyburn, 2015

- Location within Queensland Location within Australia
- 28.0088°S 151.5868°E
- Location: Dove Street, Leyburn, Southern Downs Region, Queensland, Australia

History
- Design period: 1840s - 1860s (mid-19th century)
- Built: 1871 - 1918

Site notes
- Architect: Richard George Suter
- Architectural style: Gothic

Queensland Heritage Register
- Official name: St Augustines Anglican Church, Leyburn, St Augustine's Church of England, Leyburn
- Type: state heritage (landscape, built)
- Designated: 21 August 1992
- Reference no.: 600828
- Significant period: 1870s (historical); 1870s, 1910s (fabric)
- Significant components: furniture/fittings, fencing, lamp/s - gas, stained glass window/s, vestry, churchyard, gate/s, views to, church
- Builders: John Baillie

St Augustines Anglican Church is a heritage-listed church at Dove Street, Leyburn, Southern Downs Region, Queensland, Australia. It was designed by Richard George Suter and built from 1871 to 1918. It is also known as St Augustine's Church of England. It was added to the Queensland Heritage Register on 21 August 1992.

== History ==
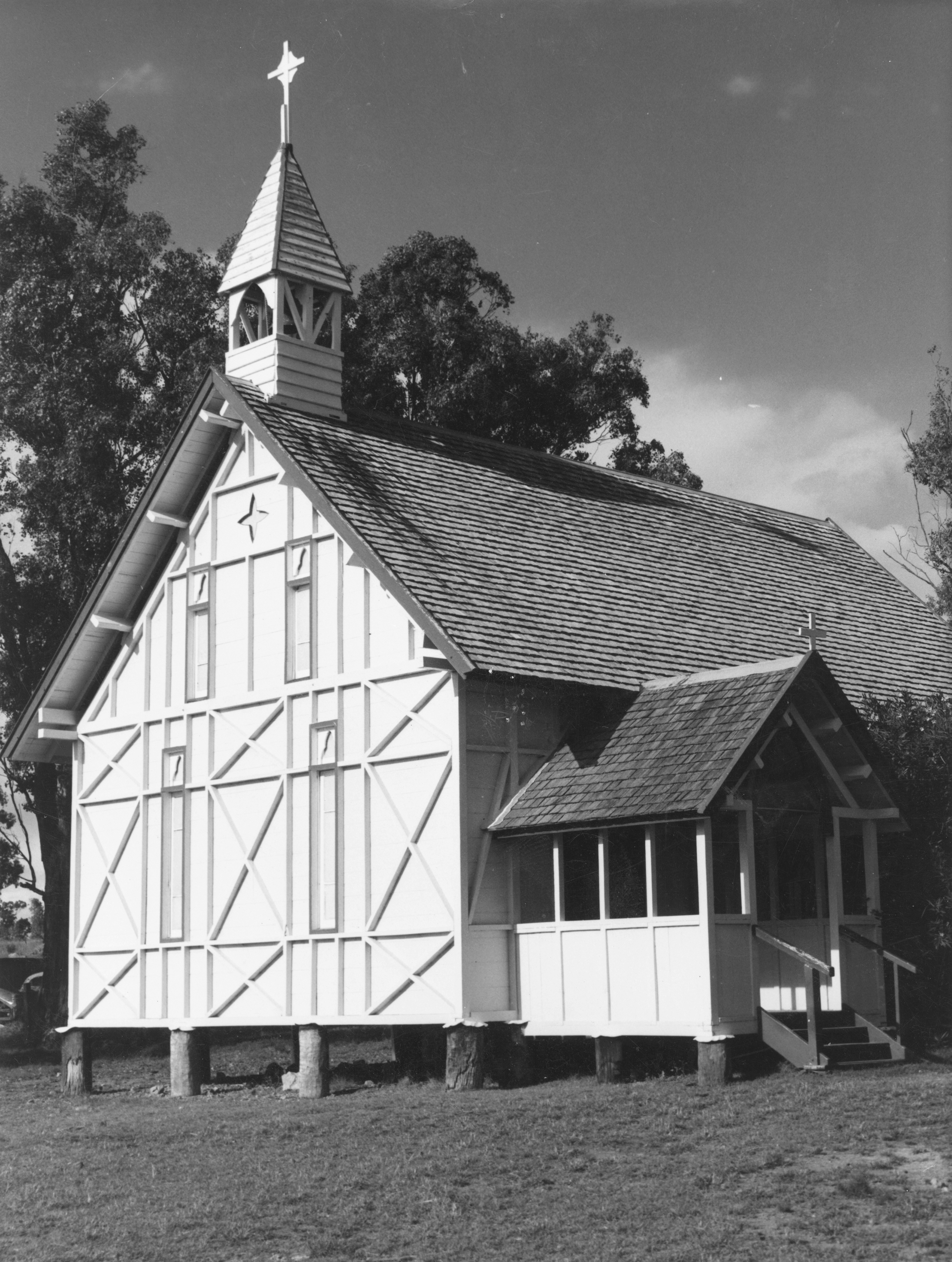
St Augustines Church of England, Leyburn

The settlement on Canal Creek (a tributary of the Condamine River) had grown from the 1840s to service the colonising settlers following the stock route blazed by the Leslie brothers in 1840 to the southern Darling Downs. Known from 1853 as Leyburn, the first sale of allotments was held in 1857 following the survey of the town earlier that year.

By 1872 a state school, an Anglican church, Police Station and Court House, two smithies, three stores, a sawmill and the inevitable three hotels made up the straggling wooden town centre along the road to Warwick. The town was described as "always a sleepy little town ... whose calm was broken by the brief Canal Creek gold-rush in 1871-2 ... clothed in dust raised by the slow passage of teams and flocks through the town". Most men were either employed as carriers on the Toowoomba-Goondiwindi road or else worked on nearby stations, rejoining their families at their Leyburn cottages on Saturday night.

As one of the Darling Downs droving, drinking, and administrative centres located on the old stock and work-routes, significant government infrastructure was located in the town: from 1852 Leyburn became a postal distribution point for the district with mail services branching out from the town; in 1872 the town was connected to the electric telegraph system becoming an important repeating station between Sydney and Brisbane; in 1861 Leyburn was appointed as a place for the holding of Courts of Petty Sessions, a Police Magistrate was appointed, and a lock-up erected followed in 1867 by a court house; the Leyburn National School opened in 1862.

The bypassing of Leyburn by the western railways signalled its (and other similarly bypassed towns') decline: in 1868 the Toowoomba to Dalby link was completed and in 1871 the Toowoomba to Warwick link, leaving only (yet significantly) the Goondiwindi traffic to pass through Leyburn. In the 1900s that too was destroyed with the building of the South Western railway line known as the Border Fence from Warwick to Goondiwindi (later extended to Dirranbandi).

Anglican church services had been held in Leyburn since the 1840s when the Bishop of the newly formed Diocese of Newcastle (of which Queensland, then part of New South Wales was part) sent to the district the man who would become known as the Apostle of the Downs, the Reverend Benjamin Glennie. Early services were held at various locations including public houses and later the Court House. In 1861 the Anglican parish of Leyburn was formed and a parsonage erected on land donated by the Gore family of nearby Yandilla. A church, however, was not erected until 1871.

According to contemporary newspaper reports, the building of the church was mainly due to the Bishop of Brisbane (Edward Wyndham Tufnell) who chose Leyburn to be the beneficiary of moneys sent by a number of students of the College of St Augustine in England which were to be expended in the erection of a church in Queensland. The site chosen on the main Warwick Road near the Court House was purchased in 1870 for £4. Tenders for fencing in the English Church ground were accepted soon after; tenders for the erection of the new church were called by architect RG Suter in September. Built of 12" pit-sawn timber with shingled roof, the contractor was John Baillie, the church of St Augustine of Canterbury was dedicated in September 1871 by Bishop Tufnell.

Architect Richard George Suter (1827–1894) was responsible for the design of at least ten of some thirty-four churches built during the episcopate of Bishop Tufnell (1859–74) including St Mark's Warwick (1867–70) and St James' Toowoomba (1868–69) as well as a number of timber churches including St Andrew's Lutwyche (1866) and (the first) St David's Allora (1868). Suter also undertook a considerable amount of work for the Queensland Board of Education. Like his churches, Suter's early schools used timber with outside studding as a construction technique, an ingenious modification of traditional half-timbered construction developed and popularised by Suter in Queensland. He designed relatively few houses, but residences such as East Talgai (1868) and Jimbour (1873–4) homesteads are some of the most substantial and distinguished ever erected in Queensland.

Following the decline in importance of Leyburn with the building of the railways, the parish name and centre was changed in 1889 from Leyburn to Pittsworth. To enable the priest (who now travelled from Pittsworth) to stay overnight in Leyburn, a vestry was added to the church in 1918; the timber being supplied by Mr McDonald. The shingles were replaced between 1889 and 1924 and donated by Mr McWilliam. In 1924 the parish of Millmerran was formed of which Leyburn became a part. In 1931, the roof was again reshingled (by Mr T Hutton) with shingles cut by Mr W Lambley of Pratten; reshingling was again carried out in 1993 using ironbark cut from the property of local parishioners Clarrie and Nola Kirby.

In 1986 stained glass windows were erected behind the altar. More recently a memorial erected by the local historical society in the grounds of the church to gold miner Dan Bray (died 1901) as a tribute to all the goldminers of Leyburn's' early history who lie in unmarked graves in unknown places.

On 14 November 2021, St Augustine's Anglican Church celebrated its 150th anniversary.

== Description ==
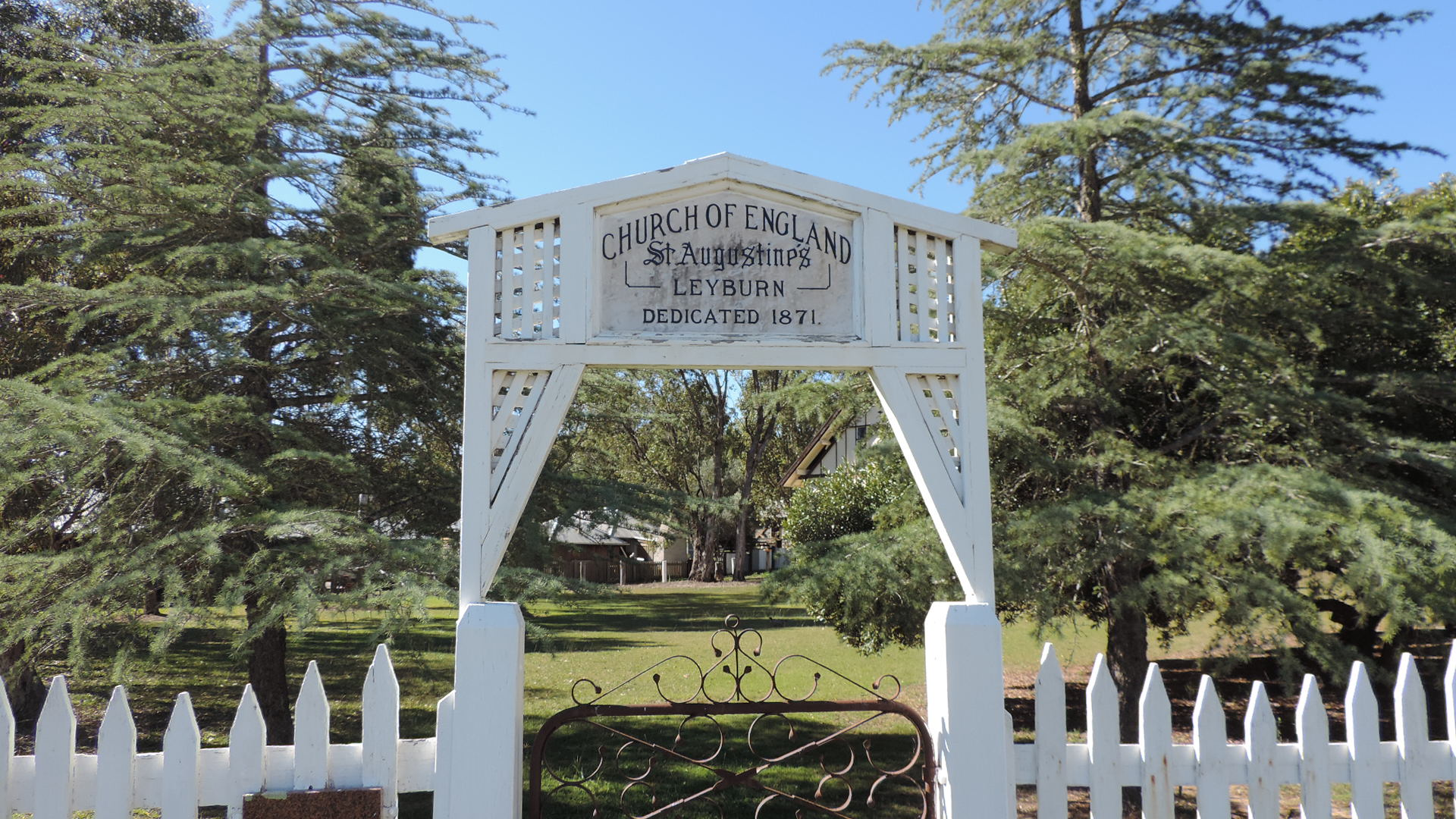
Entrance gate, 2015

Leyburn is a rural village on the southern reaches of the Darling Downs, some 50 kilometres (31 mi) northwest of Warwick, on the banks of Canal Creek. St. Augustine's Church is located on the north-eastern approach to the village from Toowoomba, Dove Street. The church is timber of outside stud framing on low timber stumps with a steeply pitched gabled roof clad in hardwood shingles. It is reputedly styled on English village churches of the period, expressing many Gothic elements in a vernacular form of construction.

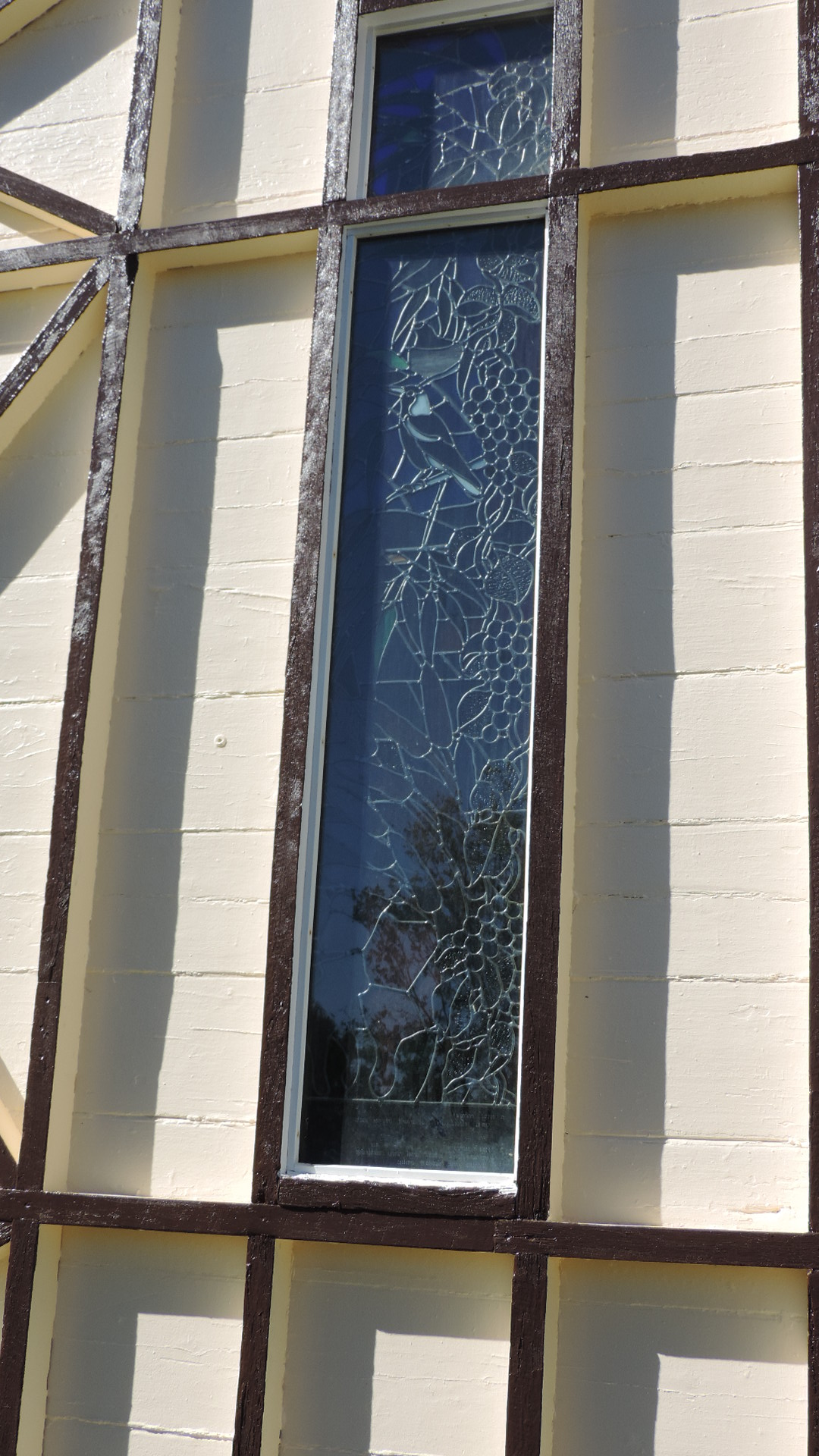
Outside stud framing and narrow window

The church is positioned centrally within the site, which slopes gently to the east. The nave is orientated east-west, with the chancel at the eastern end and Dove Street to the west. Entrance to the site is through a timber arched gateway with a small pine tree and a short bay of picket fencing to either side. The remainder of the fencing is of timber rails. There are several saplings to the perimeter fence, and a clump of eucalypts to the northern side. To the east of the site is a small weatherboard store, and a memorial to the gold miner Dan Bray under an open shelter also roofed in shingles.

The church is a simple rectilinear form, with the chancel to eastern end and the porch to the south of the western end. The addition housing the vestry is to the south-east corner. The wall framing of studs, noggings and bracing is exposed to the exterior of the building, and purposefully arranged as a decorative element which is further emphasised by its contrasting colour. The wall cladding to the interior of the framing is pit-sawn planks of cypress pine, some 250 millimetres (9.8 in) wide, laid horizontally. The roof is steeply pitched with gable ends, and a timber bell-cote with spire at the western end. The roof is clad in hand-split hardwood shingles. The entry door from the south porch is a boarded and ledged door with a lancet head, and still furnishing its original bolt and rimlock. Inside, the nave has a special quality of light created by a continuous opening between the top of the walls and the roof framing, to the sides and the gable ends. The tall, narrow windows hand painted with a stipple pattern also contribute to this light. These windows have trefoil heads applied to the outside, giving them a Gothic-like shadow internally. They open by sliding along tracks to the inside of the wall. The floor is of wide raw cypress pine boards, which are hand-scrubbed clean to retain their bleached appearance. The exposed roof framing and trusses have been stained. All the major members are stop chamfered. The trusses feature twisted vertical tie rods. The chancel arch, also of lancet form, is lined with beaded board.

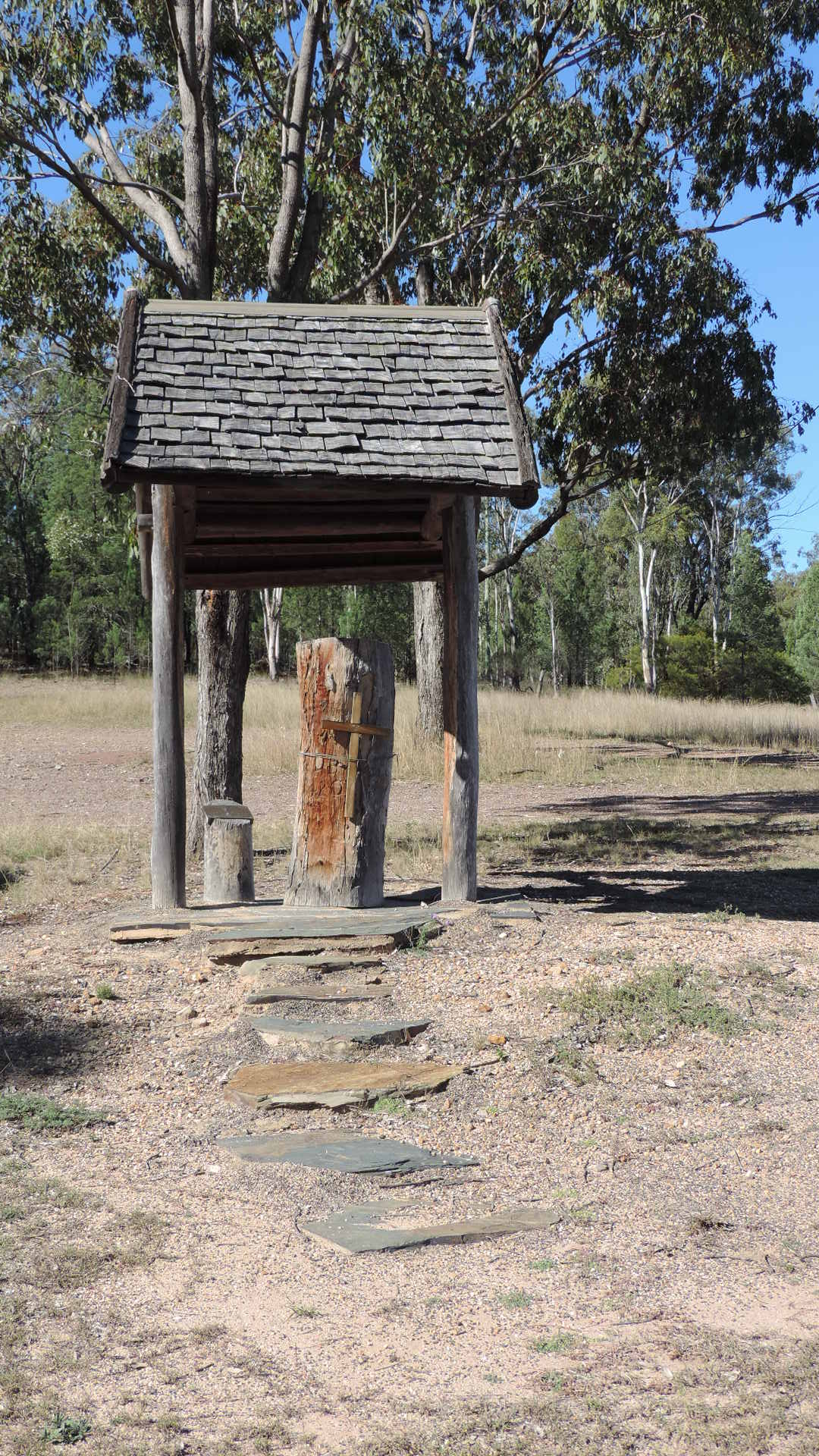
Memorial for gold miner Dan Bray

The furniture reputedly dates from the church's establishment. The altar, lectern, pulpit and pews are of stained pine. To the west end of the aisle is the movable stone baptism font. The altar has been moved away from the apse to face the congregation. The original timber screen from the altar is presently stored in the vestry. To the rear of the altar there are now stained glass windows. To the side walls of the chancel are gas lamps on swivelling brackets.

The later addition of the vestry is lined with narrow boards. It houses a dresser, washstand, bed, wardrobe, and the bellows organ. Also stored here are the original gas lamps from the roof, and the dedication chalice and plate.

== Heritage listing ==
St Augustines Anglican Church, Leyburn was listed on the Queensland Heritage Register on 21 August 1992 having satisfied the following criteria.

The place is important in demonstrating the evolution or pattern of Queensland's history.

St Augustine's Leyburn was erected in 1871 to the design of one of Queensland's most notable architects, RG Suter. Responsible for some of the state's most significant residences he also undertook considerable work for the Board of Education as well as the Church of England. His timber buildings in particular for both organisations established a local tradition, albeit without the architectural pretensions of Suter's original designs, of timber buildings with outside studding which combined economy, internal finish, and picturesque appearance. Architect also to several churches constructed in stone, it was Suter's timber churches such as St Augustine's (believed to be his only remaining timber church) which presented a challenge to the theological thinking of the time which viewed timber as an unsuitable material to be used in the construction of the houses of God.

Together with other buildings of the nineteenth century particularly of the 1860s and 1870s, St Augustine's is a symbol of the more prosperous times of Leyburn and an integral part of its townscape which presents a remarkably intact example of an early Queensland township as well as an important representation of the settlement of the Darling Downs.

The place demonstrates rare, uncommon or endangered aspects of Queensland's cultural heritage.

St Augustine's is a rare example of a surviving timber shingled roofed building; made more remarkable by the survival of its shingled relative, the playshed at Leyburn State School.

The place is important because of its aesthetic significance.

Although reputedly patterned on the form of English village churches, the expression of the timber work and the simplified Gothic motifs give St Augustine's a delicate lightweight vernacular charm; there is a special quality of the internal light through the eaves and translucent windows.

The place has a strong or special association with a particular community or cultural group for social, cultural or spiritual reasons.

Together with other buildings of the nineteenth century particularly of the 1860s and 1870s, St Augustine's is a symbol of the more prosperous times of Leyburn and an integral part of its townscape which presents a remarkably intact example of an early Queensland township as well as an important representation of the settlement of the Darling Downs

The place has a special association with the life or work of a particular person, group or organisation of importance in Queensland's history.

St Augustine's Leyburn was erected in 1871 to the design of one of Queensland's most notable architects, RG Suter.
