= St David's Anglican Church, Allora =

St Davids Anglican Church, Allora
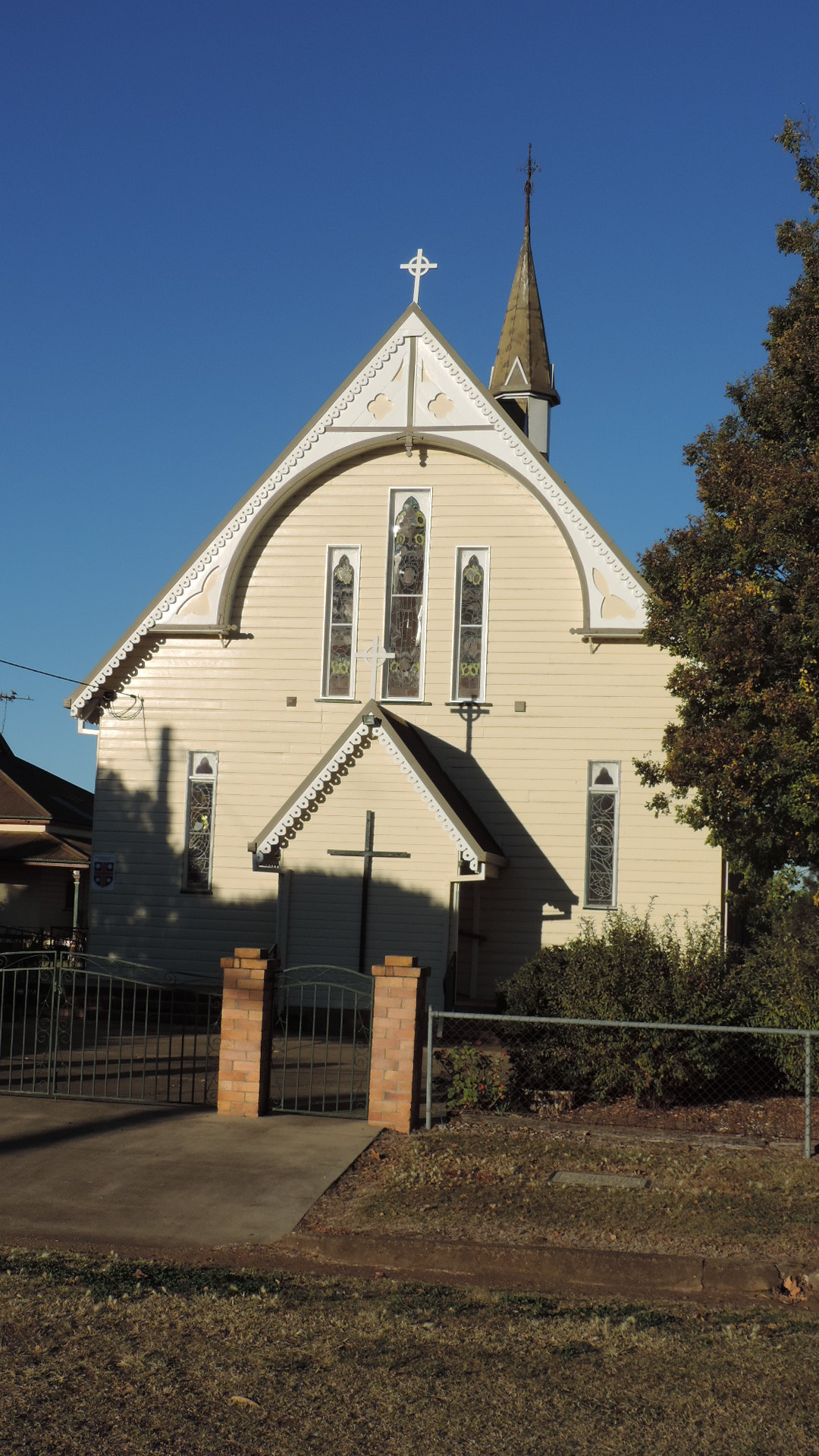
- St Davids Anglican Church, 2015

- Location within Queensland Location within Australia
- 28.0358°S 151.9899°E
- Location: 1 Church Street, Allora, Southern Downs Region, Queensland, Australia

History
- Design period: 1870s–1890s (late 19th century)
- Built: 1887–1901

Site notes
- Architect(s): Francis Drummond Greville Stanley, John H. Buckeridge
- Architectural style: Gothic Revival

Queensland Heritage Register
- Official name: St Davids Anglican Church, St David's Church of England
- Type: state heritage (landscape, built)
- Designated: 24 March 2000
- Reference no.: 602061
- Significant period: 1880s (historical) ongoing (social); 1880s, 1900s (fabric)
- Significant components: views to, hall, residential accommodation – rectory, church, garden/grounds, stained glass window/s
- Builders: W.G Gillam

St Davids Anglican Church is a heritage-listed church at 1 Church Street, Allora, Southern Downs Region, Queensland, Australia. It was designed by Francis Drummond Greville Stanley and built from 1887 to 1901. It is also known as St David's Church of England. It was added to the Queensland Heritage Register on 24 March 2000.

== History ==
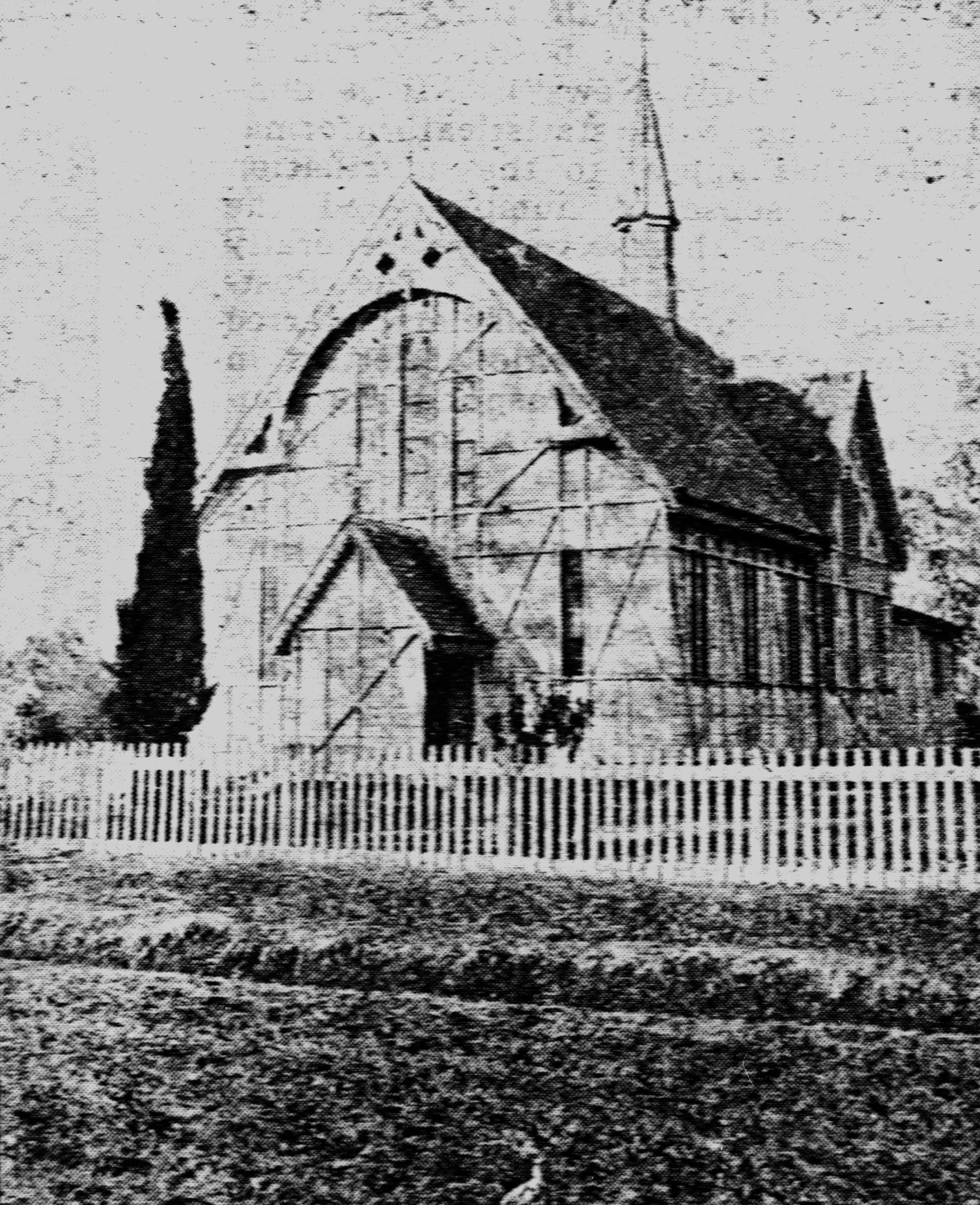
St. Davids Church of England, Allora, 1897

St. David's Church, Allora, is a timber, Gothic Revival style church prominently located at the end of the main thoroughfare of the town. It was constructed in 1887–88 to the design of leading Queensland colonial architect F.D.G Stanley. This building is the second church to be built on the site, which also contains a rectory designed by architect John H. Buckeridge (1901) and a parish hall (1912, 1962).

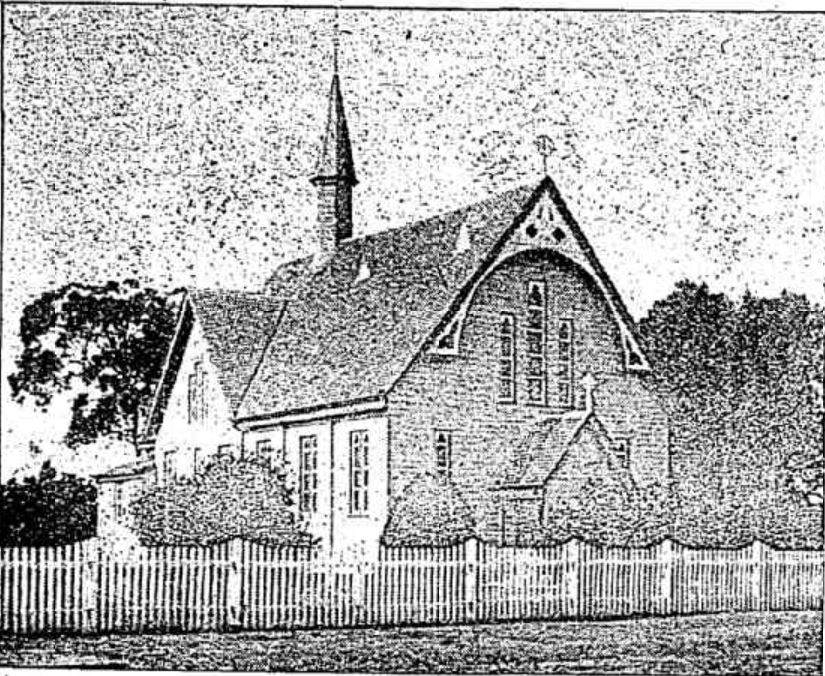
St David's Anglican Church, 1907

Allora claims to be amongst Queensland's oldest inland towns. The beginnings of a small settlement at the crossing of Dalrymple Creek was recorded in 1844. A survey of the town was completed by G.F Pratten in 1859 and land sales began the following year. In 1862, Reverend Benjamin Glennie bought land at Dalrymple Creek in the name of Anglican Bishop of Brisbane Edward Tufnell. A two roomed timber slab cottage was built on the site of the present Parish Hall and used as a school, Sunday school and teacher's residence. Reverend Glennie preached here once a month. Prior to this, church services in Allora had generally been held at the Dalrymple Hotel and sporadically at a number of the early stations. One such is recorded to have been held by Glennie at Talgai Station in 1852.

Allora township continued to grow throughout the 1860s. By the end of the decade, Allora was becoming a substantial town, servicing the blacksoil farms established along Dalrymple Creek as a result of the lands acts of the 1860s. In 1868, the first purpose built church of St. David was erected on the site of the present church. It was designed by architect Richard George Suter and was typical of his timber churches that used outside studding to decorative effect. Suter also designed Allora's first national school in 1866 which was similar in design to the church. The original slab hut continued to be used for church services until the completion of the new church and was then relocated in 1870 to form part of St. Matthew's Church, Spring Creek. In 1870 Allora became a separate parish and a new rectory parsonage was built, again designed by Suter.

The first mention of a new church appeared at the Easter meeting on 27 April 1886 when a subscription list was proposed. Plans for a timber church with shingle roof to seat 400 were discussed with architect F.D.G Stanley. The brief was revised to seating for 250, as the initial design proved too expensive. New plans were shown at a meeting in December 1886 and were accepted by the Vestry. Tenders were called in January 1887 and local contractor W.G Gillam's tender of £800 was accepted. Construction was delayed, however, when Bishop William Webber requested a number of changes to the design, including the removal of doors planned for the north and south gable walls. Not all of his requests were able to be accommodated; nonetheless Bishop Webber laid the foundation stone on 5 August. The 1866 church was re-sited within the precinct to make way for the new church and was then used as a parish hall. This building was demolished in 1911.

The new church was informally opened with a service on 23 December 1888, however, the consecration of the church was not performed by Bishop Webber until 1 February 1890. The church at this time was of single skin timber construction with exposed bracing and studding on the exterior and a timber shingle roof. All the principal interior fittings were also designed by Stanley and made of cedar. F.D.G Stanley has been described as "the best known of all Queensland's early architect's because of the quality, diversity and extent of his work". He designed ten churches for the Anglican Church, five of which survive. Six of these were timber and St. David's Church, Allora is the only one that remains the property of the diocese. St. George's Anglican Church, Beenleigh (1875) is the only other surviving timber church of Stanley's design but is no longer within Anglican ownership.

Minor alterations have been made to the St. David's Church over time. In 1888, a rainwater tank was installed on the south side of the church to keep water away from the foundations. The thrust of the shingle roof was causing the side walls to shore and in 1892 tie rods were introduced to reduce the outward thrust. In 1897, the exterior was sheathed in horizontal pine chamfer boards and painted, at a cost of £108. A memorial altar and altar rails were added to the church after World War I and the original altar and rails were then donated to St Andrew's Church at Glengallan. To celebrate the golden jubilee of the church in 1938, the shingled roof was replaced with diamond laid, fibrous cement tiles. This cladding was replaced in 1978 with corrugated metal sheeting and the church was painted at the same time. Sixteen stained glass windows - nine in the chancel, two in the lower western wall and five in the north wall – were installed in the early 1980s.

The early rectory designed by Suter was sold for removal to W. Leggat and re-sited at 35 Warwick Street, Allora. The present rectory was constructed in 1901 to the design of architect John H Buckeridge who was then architect for the Diocese. Construction was supervised by the Toowoomba firm of James Marks and Son and the cost was £546. A hall for Sunday School was built in 1912 and was then amalgamated with the former church of St. Andrew, Glengallon in 1962 to form the parish hall presently on the site. In 1967, a lean-to garage and storage shed were built next to the hall.

== Description ==
St. David's Church, Allora is a small timber building elevated on a short brick plinth and clad in weatherboards, with a steeply pitched, wide pan "trimdeck" roof. It is set within a large grassed site, together with the timber rectory and parish hall.

The building follows traditional church planning with a central nave of six bays with an apsidal chancel at the rear end. Six windows with foiled heads line the side aisles of the building, indicating the internal bays. Gabled projections from the northern and southern sides of the church provide an allusion of transepts and enhance the formality and scale of the building. Other notable architectural elements on the exterior of the building include a slender timber fleche located on the crossing of the roof ridges, six gabled roof vents and scalloped and pierced bargeboards.

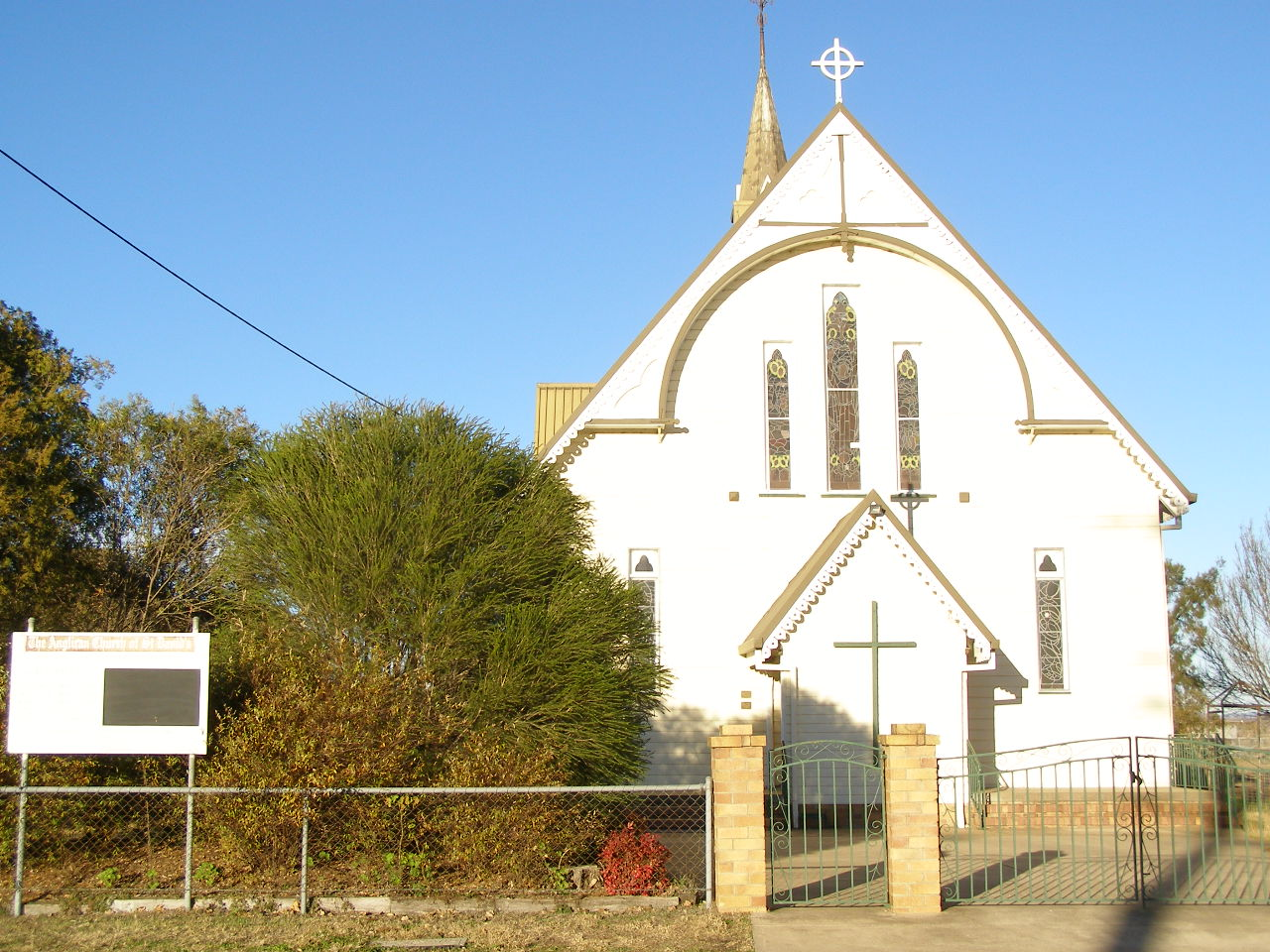
St David's Anglican Church, 2007

The church is entered via a small gabled porch that is centrally located on the principal facade. The porch is part of a concrete apron that continues to the boundary of the site at the street where a set of four decorative steel gates on brick piers are located. The porch is flanked by single windows with trefoil heads and a tripartite lancet stained glass window arrangement is located above. A ramp is located on the northern elevation of the building.

The interior of the church has an open roof structure consisting of arched brace trusses with the ceiling lined in unpainted, stained diagonal timber boarding. Timbers used in the construction and furnishings of the church, such as cedar, are now rare or irreplaceable. Timber fittings include the pews, rails, pulpit and altar. Stained glass windows are located in the gabled sections in the north and south walls and the apse.

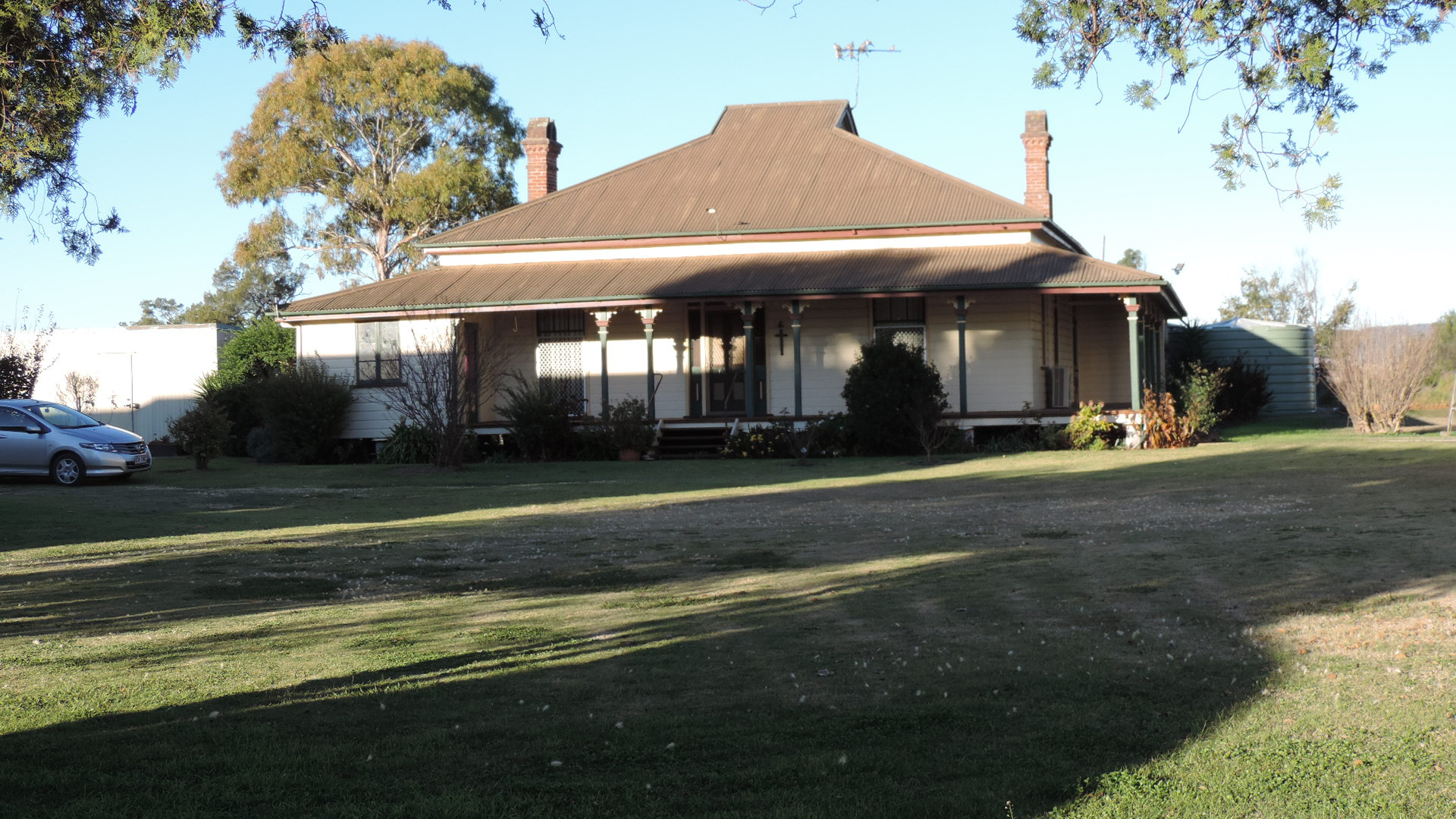
Rectory, 2015

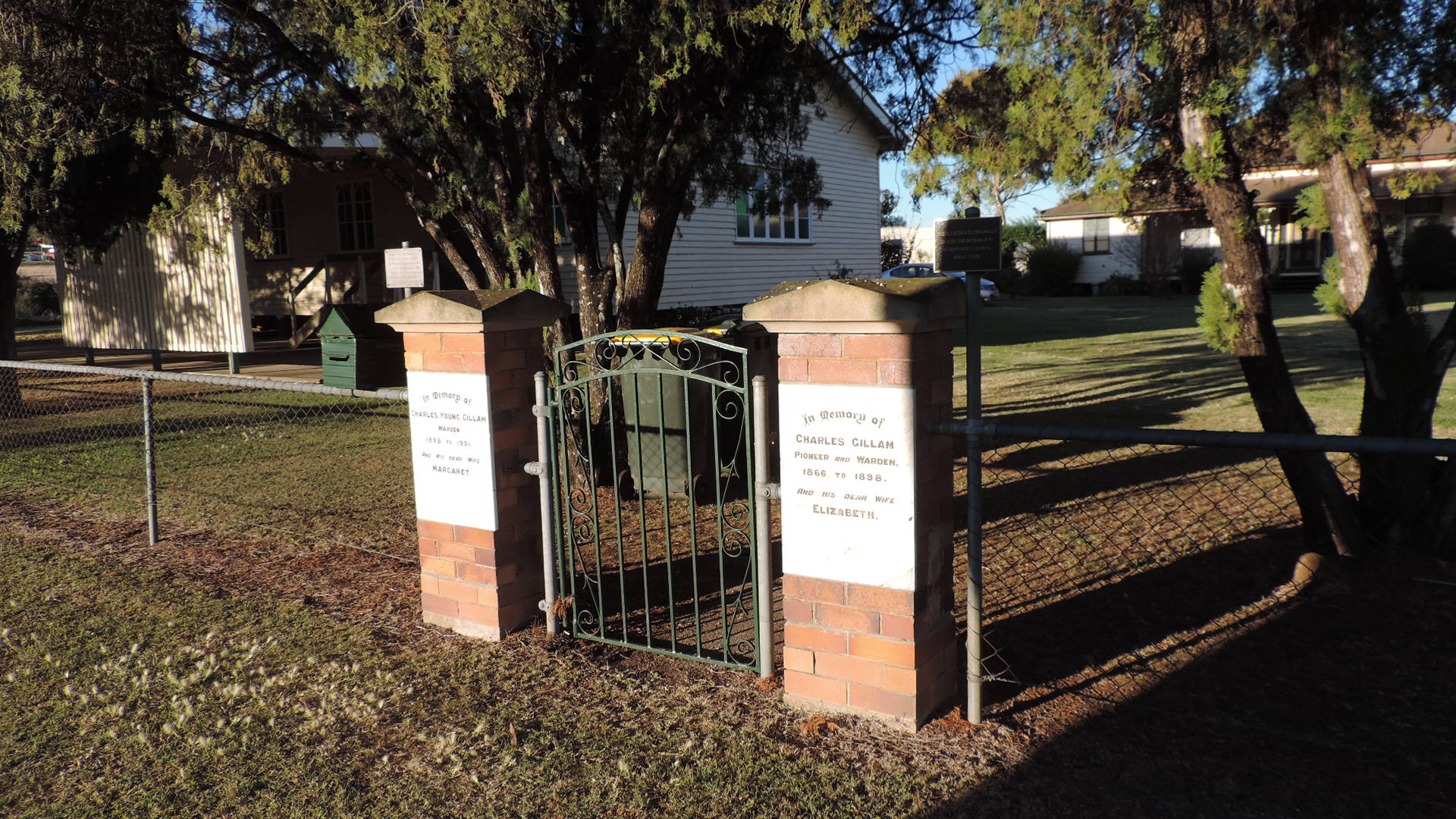
Memorial gates, 2015

The rectory is a low, single storey house with a gabled hip roof. It is constructed of timber and has verandahs on two sides and an enclosed section of verandah on a third side. The house is entered via a short set of steps which are flanked by two pairs of timber columns with decorative capitals and brackets. The roof is clad in painted corrugated steel and has two brick chimney stacks. The parish hall is composed of two sections, both timber with corrugated steel roofs and elevated on short timber posts. The northern section is a former church and has a pitched roof, small entry porch and three pairs of double-hung sash windows on each side. The southern section is wider with a shallower, pitched roof and pairs of casement windows with an arched detail at the heads.

== Heritage listing ==
St Davids Anglican Church was listed on the Queensland Heritage Register on 24 March 2000 having satisfied the following criteria.

The place is important in demonstrating the evolution or pattern of Queensland's history.

St. David's Church Precinct is significant for demonstrating the growth of the Allora district within an important agricultural area of the Darling Downs. In particular, St. David's Church Precinct demonstrates the growth of the Anglican Church in Queensland and reflects local community efforts in meeting their spiritual needs, being an accretion of both purpose-designed buildings and buildings brought to the site.

The church also has a special association with prominent colonial Queensland architect F.D.G Stanley and is one of two remaining intact timber churches designed by Stanley for the Anglican Church. The rectory has an association with another important Queensland architect, John Buckeridge.

The place is important in demonstrating the principal characteristics of a particular class of cultural places.

St. David's Church Precinct demonstrates the principal characteristics of a small, nineteenth century timber church and related buildings located in a small rural settlement. Key features of the church include the simple building form, steeply pitched gable roof, timber fleche and scalloped and pierced bargeboards.

The place is important because of its aesthetic significance.

The church has architectural and aesthetic significance derived from the well composed design which uses architectural elements to enhance the formal presence of the church in its setting. The rectory also has aesthetic significance as a fine example of a gracious timber dwelling. The collection of buildings has significant landmark qualities in the Allora townscape and from the New England Highway.

The place has a strong or special association with a particular community or cultural group for social, cultural or spiritual reasons.

St. David's Church has a strong spiritual and social association with the Anglican Parish in Allora as their principal place of worship for over 100 years.
