= Allora Racecourse =

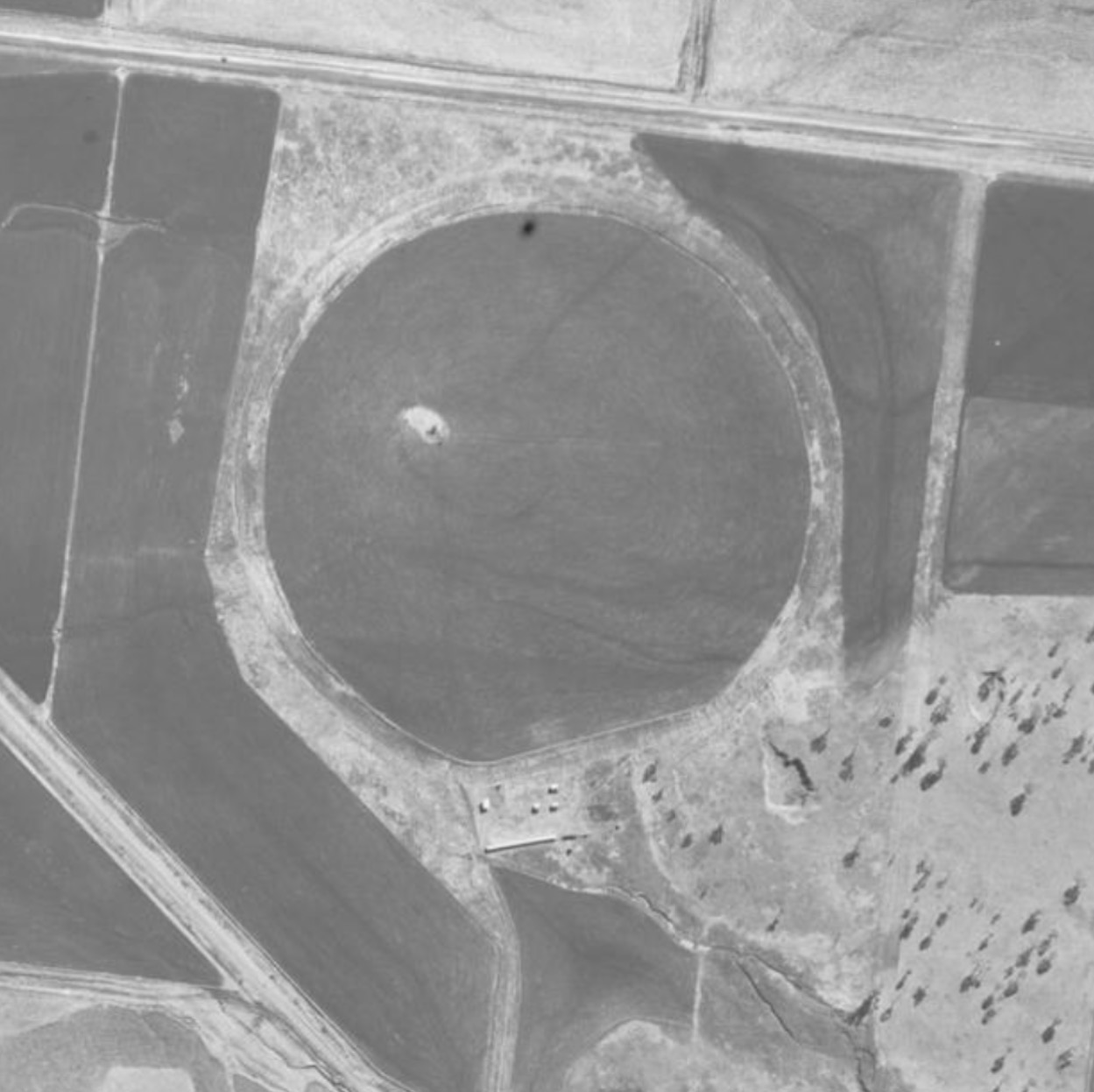
- Aerial photo of Allora Racecourse on 1 June 1951.
- Interactive map of Allora Racecourse
- Location: Allora, Southern Downs Region, Queensland, Australia
- Coordinates: 28°02′50″S 152°00′31″E
- Owned by: Allora Race Club
- Date opened: 1888
- Date closed: 2018-20
- Notable races: Allora Cup

Allora Racecourse was a horse racing track in Allora, Queensland, Australia.

== History ==
The Allora Jockey Club was formed during a meeting held in Allora's Princess of Wales Hotel on October 6, 1888.

On May 11 1935 and May 26 1936, a race was held, hosted by race secretary C. Fogarty. After World War Two ended, horse racing was suspended until the 2nd January, 1949, when a meeting was held. For the next 11 years, the race club secretary was Jack Hilton, who was also the Allora railway station master. On 8 October, the first Allora Cup meeting was held with an overall prize money of £45 and a cup valued at £10. The winner of the inaugural Allora Cup was the horse ‘Nobleman’’ owned by Tom Cowley. According to local racing historian Shirley Murray, the cup meeting was a huge event in the town, with a half-day holiday granted.

On 21 April 1953, during a general business meeting of the Allora Shire Council, the Chairman John Hoey drew attention to the difficulty of keeping the Allora racecourse in order for meetings. After discussion, it resulted in offering the racecourse area to the Allora Race Club to control as trustee.

Since the 1990s, the site around the Allora Racecourse is used to grow sunflower crops every summer. The field is currently owned by Phil and Lisa Crothers. According to Southern Downs agri-tourism co-ordinary Amy Walker, the area is one of the most popular attractions for the Southern Downs and Granite Belt region during the summer months. Allora Racecourse was retained for equine purposes into the 2000s. It served as a horse training track, and by 2008-09, it had a fee schedule as of this order: 1–5 horses cost $200, 6–10 horses cost $390, and 11–15 horses cost $595. In 2012, $40,000 was funded for repairing washed tracks. In 2017, the Southern Downs Regional Council proposed redeveloping the former Allora Racecourse to accommodate new harness and greyhound racing. The plan was rejected in July, as it fell outside Racing Queensland's preferred locality.

== Races ==
=== 8 October 1949 Allora Cup ===
The winner was a horse named Nobleman owned by Tom Cowley, trained by Dick Byrne and ridden by Joe Murphy. The event drew a large crowd.

=== 1950 Allora Cup ===
The 1950 Allora Cup was won by a horse named Bon Ami, owned by R. C. Crowther.

=== 1952 Allora Cup ===
On 26 September 1952, the winner of the Allora Cup was Witty Nero, a four-year old gelding owned by Mr. F. W. Turner and trained by Frank Watt. Witty Nero was a consistent performer with five wins in 12 starts, and was heavily backed by bettors. The gelding won comfortably by four lengths over High Custom, with the horse Orizaba finishing third. Following the event, the trophy was handed to Mr. Turner by club patron Keith Murray.

=== 1953 Allora Cup ===
The 1953 Allora Cup was won by a mare named Plane, owned by Frank Armstrong.

=== 1955 Allora Cup ===
The 1955 Allora Cup was won by a mare named Lurcher Queen, also owned by Frank Armstrong.

=== 1956 Allora Cup ===
The winner was a horse named Bubbatonga owned by Bob Armstrong.

== Accidents ==
- On 16 September 1914, a rider named Mr. Fred Lancaster from Warwick was injured during the Friendly Societies’ Handicap race. He was riding a horse named Oplet when the horse swerved, causing him to crash into a post, which crushed his knee by the impact. However, Lancaster carried on to finish the race in 2nd place. Afterwards, an ambulance was called and he was treated with first aid for his knee, before being transported to the Warwick General Hospital.
- On March 25, 1940, a horse named Willie Win tripped on a depression on the track, causing a broken leg which eventually resulted in the animal's death. On 23 November, Clifford Henry Mewes, who was the owner of the horse, sought £20 and a legal case was heard in Allora. His plaintiff argued that the horse had fallen due to a depression in the track which had been worsened by rain. However, the defense, led by the President of the Allora Jockey Club stated that the depression was minor and naturally occurring, and that the track was in good condition for racing. The court sided with the defendant after finding no evidence that the depression caused the horse's fall. The Magistrate's judgment concluded that the Allora Jockey Club was not negligent, and awarded costs to the defendant, totaling £9/14/6.
