= Allora, Queensland =

Allora
- Town
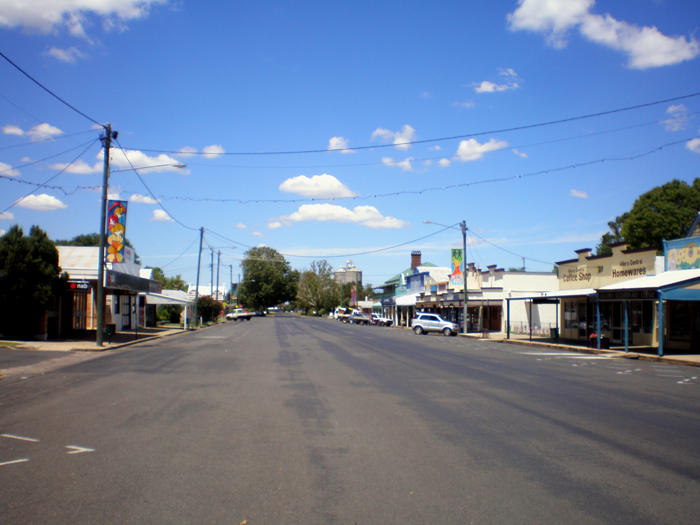
- Main street

- Interactive map of Allora
- Coordinates: 28.0355°S 151.9802°E
- Country: Australia
- State: Queensland
- LGA: Southern Downs Region
- Location: 17.9 km (11.1 mi) SE of Clifton; 25.9 km (16.1 mi) N of Warwick; 58.2 km (36.2 mi) S of Toowoomba; 160 km (99 mi) SW of Brisbane

Government
  - State electorate: Southern Downs
  - Federal division: Maranoa

Area
  - Total: 96.0 km^{2} (37.1 sq mi)

Population
  - Total: 1,205 (2021 census)
  - Density: 12.552/km^{2} (32.510/sq mi)
- Time zone: UTC+10:00 (AEST)
- Postcode: 4362
Localities around Allora
Elphinstone	Spring Creek	Forest Springs
Talgai	Allora	Berat
Talgai	Hendon	Mount Marshall

Allora is a rural town and locality in the Southern Downs Region, Queensland, Australia. In the 2021 census, the locality of Allora had a population of 1,205.

== Geography ==
Allora is on the Darling Downs in south-eastern Queensland, Australia, 160 kilometres (99 mi) by road south-west of the state capital, Brisbane. The town is located on the New England Highway between Warwick and Toowoomba.

== History ==
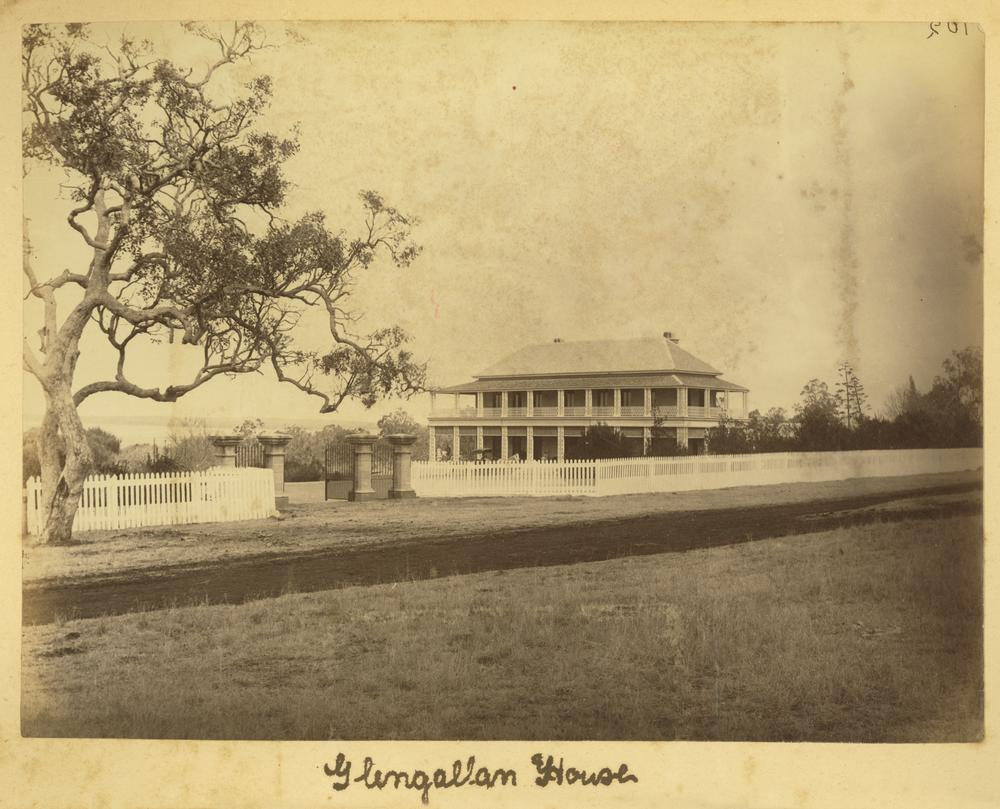
Glengallan House, near Allora, circa 1875

Giabal (also known as Paiamba, Gomaingguru) is an Australian Aboriginal language. The Giabal language region includes the landscape within the local government boundaries of the Toowoomba Regional Council, particularly Toowoomba south to Allora and west to Millmerran.

In 1854, the first Presbyterian services were held in Allora.

The town was surveyed in 1859. Its name is believed to derive from an Aboriginal word "gnarrallah", meaning waterhole or swampy place.

Following European settlement, the history of the area is entwined with two famous pastoral homesteads in the vicinity of Allora: Glengallan and Talgai. Both properties raised sheep.

The original "Talgai" run was taken up by E. E. Dalrymple in 1840. The creek that runs through Allora is named in his honour. Built in 1868 for the Clark family, Talgai Homestead stood on 300,000 acres (120,000 ha). The homestead is built of sandstone and covers sixty squares. It is now a bed and breakfast.

Allora Post Office opened on 31 March 1863.

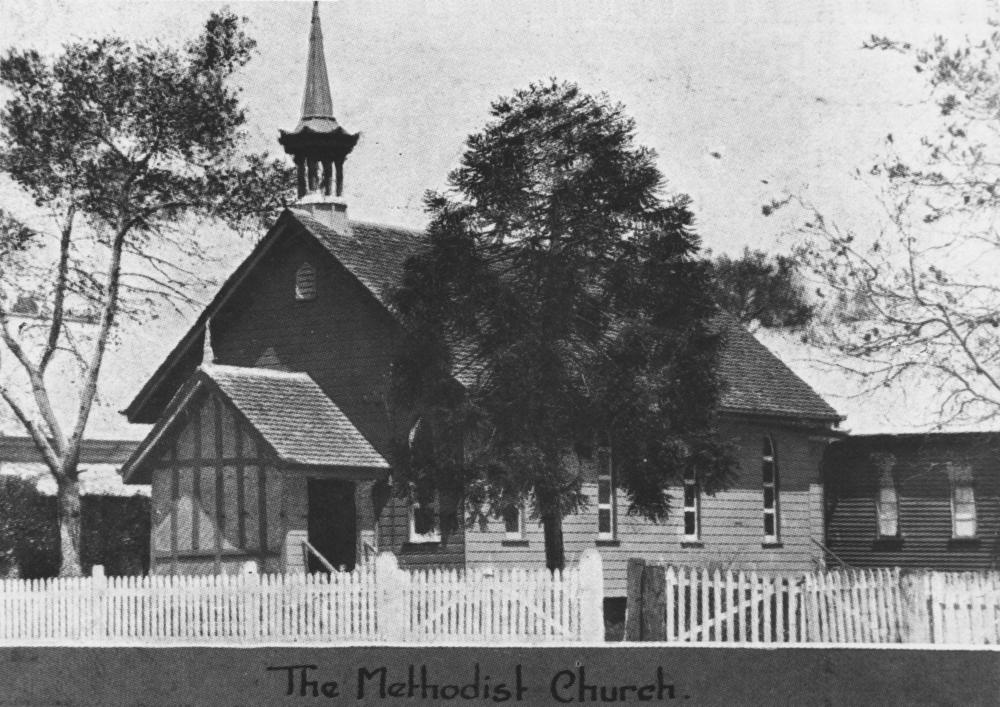
Methodist Church, 1932

In 1866, a Wesleyan Methodist church was established in Allora. Improvements were made in 1875. A new church was built in 1896.

The Allora State School opened on 1 May 1867. On 31 December 2008, it was renamed Allora P-10 State School.

From 1869, Allora had its own local government (initially Borough of Allora, from 1903 Town of Allora) then was combined with the Clifton Shire. In 1914 it separated from the Clifton Shire to become a shire in its own right as the Shire of Allora, which was administered from the Shire's offices initially on the corner of Warwick and Forde Streets in Allora, and then at 78 Herbert Street in Allora. In 1994, the Shire of Allora was amalgamated into the Shire of Warwick.

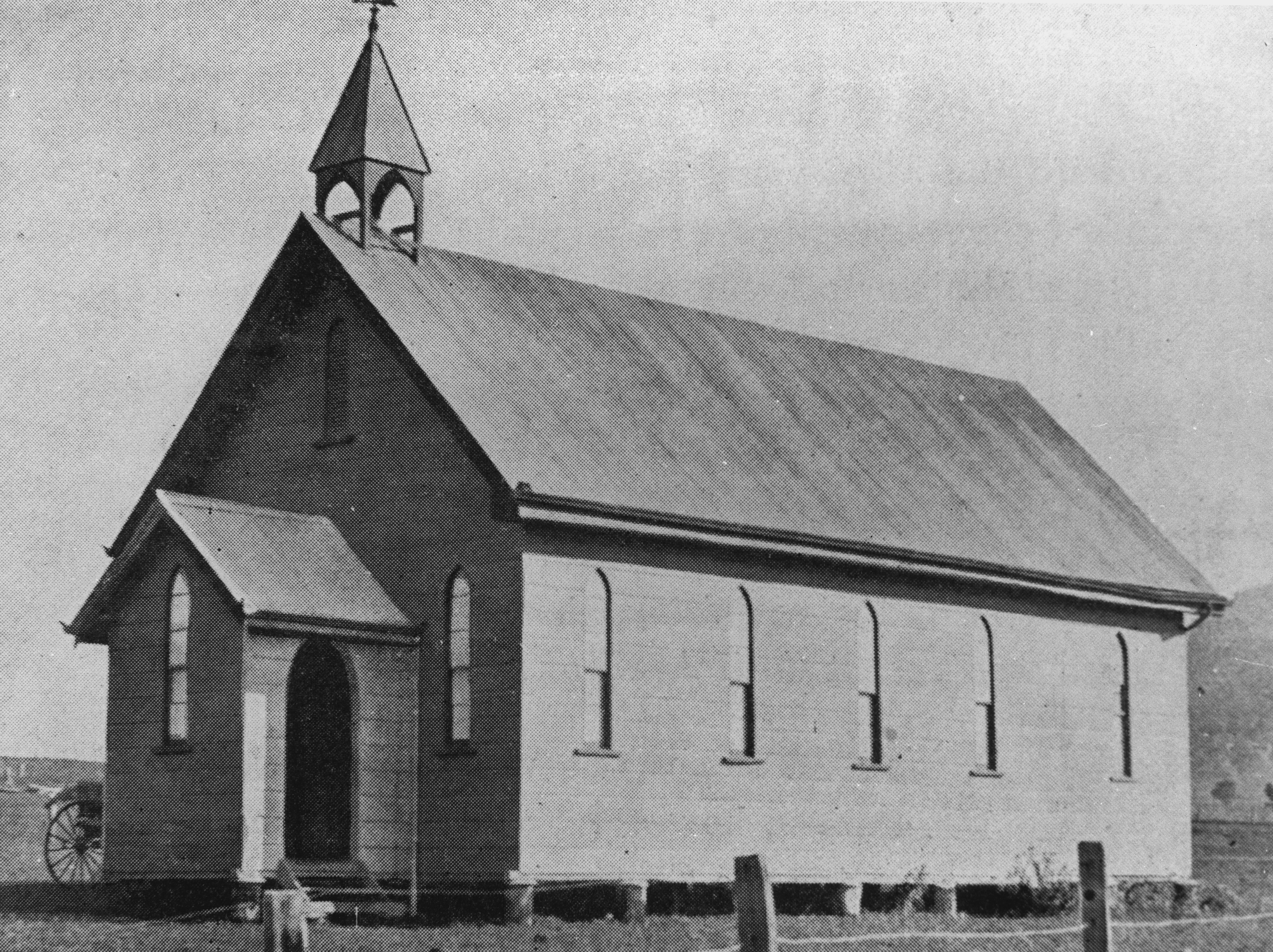
Allora Presbyterian Church, built 1879

In 1873 a permanent Presbyterian congregation was established with the arrival of Reverend Thomas Kingsford as a permanent minister. In November 1874, the congregation commenced fundraising to build a church. In September 1876, they were seeking to buy an acre of land for the church. In February 1879, they called for tenders to build the church. On Sunday 28 September 1879, the church was opened by Reverend W. Budge. It faced Forde Street opposite the town hall. In 1906, it was decided to build a new Presbyterian church facing Warwick Street opposite the Allora railway station. The foundation blocks were laid on Wednesday 25 July 1906 under the supervision of Reverend D. McLellan with over 300 people in attendance. The new church was officially opened on Wednesday 21 November 1906 by Dr Coulston, Moderator of the Presbyterian Church of Australia. The architect was Alexander Brown Wilson of Brisbane and the contractor was Henry William Stay of Allora. In October 1912, the 1879 church building was relocated to become the Presbyterian church in Goomburra, which is 15 kilometres (9.3 mi) east of Allora. The relocation of the church required two traction engines and took ten days to negotiate difficult terrain and other problems.

In 1886, the first fossil evidence of early human occupation in the area, the Talgai Skull, was found on Talgai Homestead, embedded in the wall of Dalrymple Creek. Radiocarbon dating suggests the Talgai skull is between 9,000 and 11,000 years old. It is believed to be the skull of a boy of approximately 15 years of age who had been killed by a massive blow to the side of the head.

St Patrick's Catholic Church was opened on Whit-Sunday in June 1871.

St David's Anglican Church opened in late 1888 without any ceremony. It was consecrated in 1890.

By 1894 a Presbyterian church had opened in Allora.

The Allora Boer War Memorial was unveiled on 19 October 1904 by Colonel Henry Chauvel.

Wilsonville Provisional School opened in 1906. On 1 January 1909 it became Wilsonville State School. It was amalgamated with Glengallan State School in late 1922 or early 1923 to create Mount Marshall State School.

St Patrick's Catholic School was established on 24 January 1916 by the Sisters of St Joseph of the Sacred Heart. The official opening ceremony was conducted by Roman Catholic Archbishop of Brisbane, James Duhig.

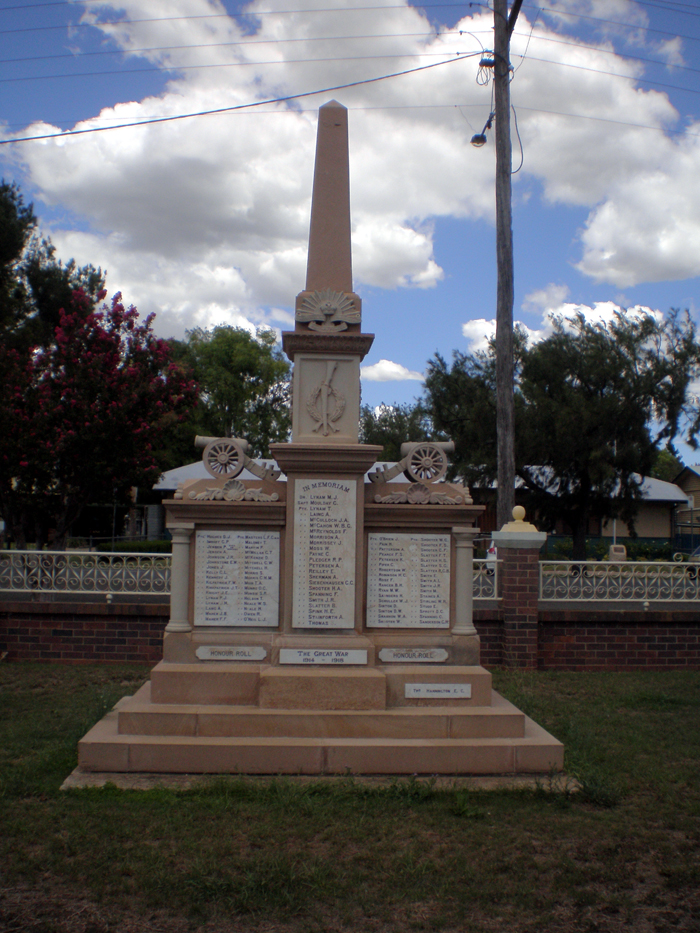
Allora Great War memorial, 2010

The Allora Shire Soldiers Memorial was unveiled on 11 November 1921 by General J.C. Robertson and the mothers of those who died.

St Paul's Church of England in Back Plains was dedicated on 12 February 1892 by Archbishop of Brisbane William Webber. The last service was conducted in Back Plains on 8 August 1943. In 1953 the church building was relocated to Nobby where it was re-established as St Paul's Church of England. The last service at Nobby was conducted circa 11 May 1975. In 1979 the building was relocated to 12 Jubb Street, Allora (28.0309°S 151.9818°E) to become the Scots Presbyterian Church for those Presbyterians in the district who did not wish to become part of the Uniting Church of Australia. The church in Allora was dedicated on 26 July 1980 by Presbyterian Moderator Rt Rev F. White. From 1949 to 1956, the Allora Cup was held at Allora Racecourse, located near the town. These events drew large crowds.

The current Allora Public Library opened in 1966 and had a minor refurbishment in 2010.

== Demographics ==
In the 2011 census, the town of Allora had a population of 889.

In the 2016 census, the locality of Allora had a population of 1,223.

In the 2021 census, the locality of Allora had a population of 1,205.

== Heritage listings ==
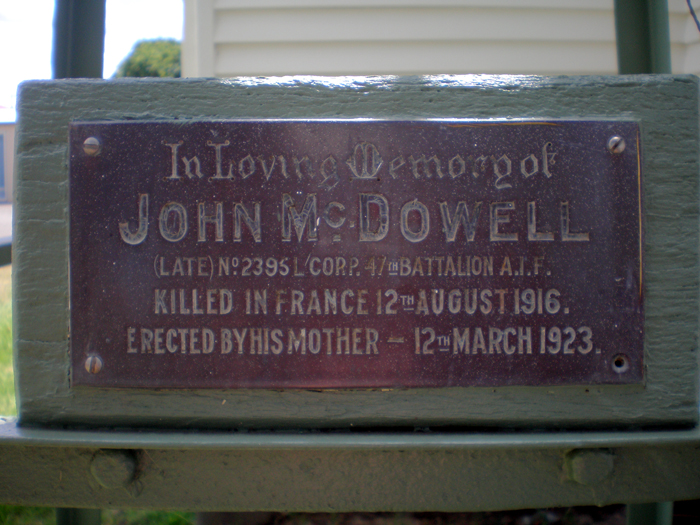
Church bell tower memorial to L/Cpl. John McDowell, AIF.

Allora has a number of heritage-listed sites, including:

- Allora Cemetery, Allora–Clifton Road
- St David's Anglican Church, 1 Church Street
- Talgai Homestead, Dalrymple Creek Road
- Boer War Memorial, Warwick Street

== Education ==
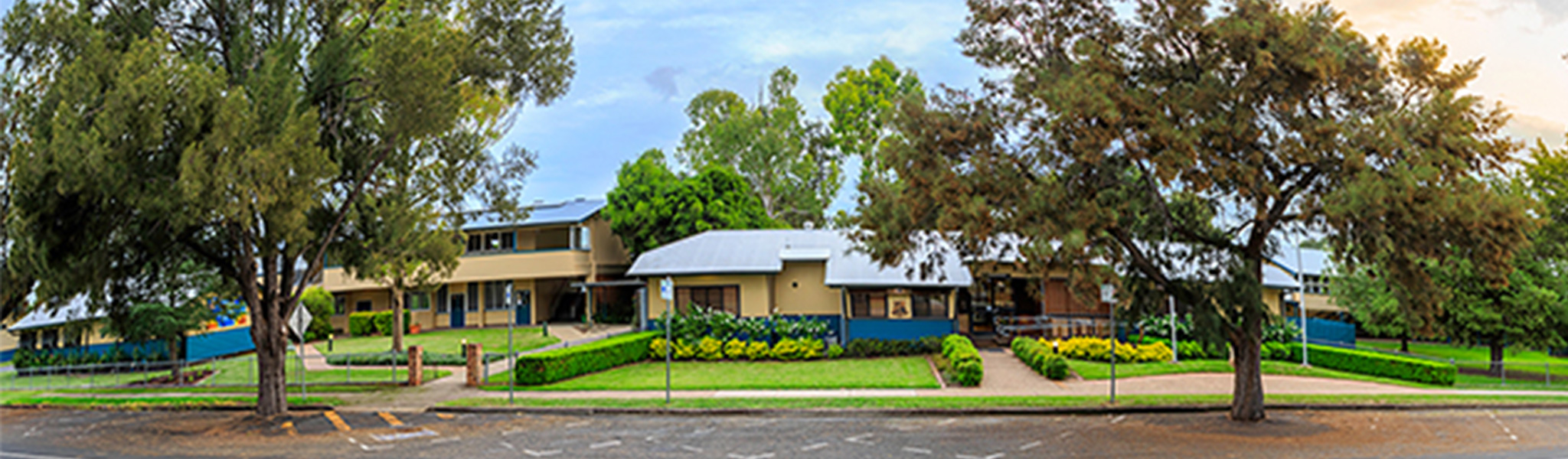
Allora State School, 2024

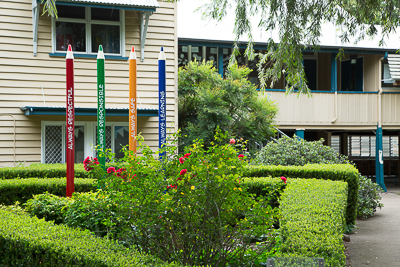
Front of Allora State School, 2017

Allora State School is a government primary and secondary (Prep–10) school for boys and girls at 21 Warwick Street (28.0361°S 151.9861°E). In 2017, the school had an enrolment of 250 students with 23 teachers (19 full-time equivalent) and 18 non-teaching staff (12 full-time equivalent). It includes a special education program.

St Patrick's School is a Catholic primary (Prep–6) school for boys and girls at 35 Arnold Street (28.0357°S 151.9780°E). In 2017, the school had an enrolment of 79 students with 8 teachers (6 full-time equivalent) and 5 non-teaching staff (2 full-time equivalent).

For secondary schooling to Year 12, the nearest government secondary schools are Clifton State High School in Clifton to the north-west and Warwick State High School in Warwick to the south-east.

== Amenities ==
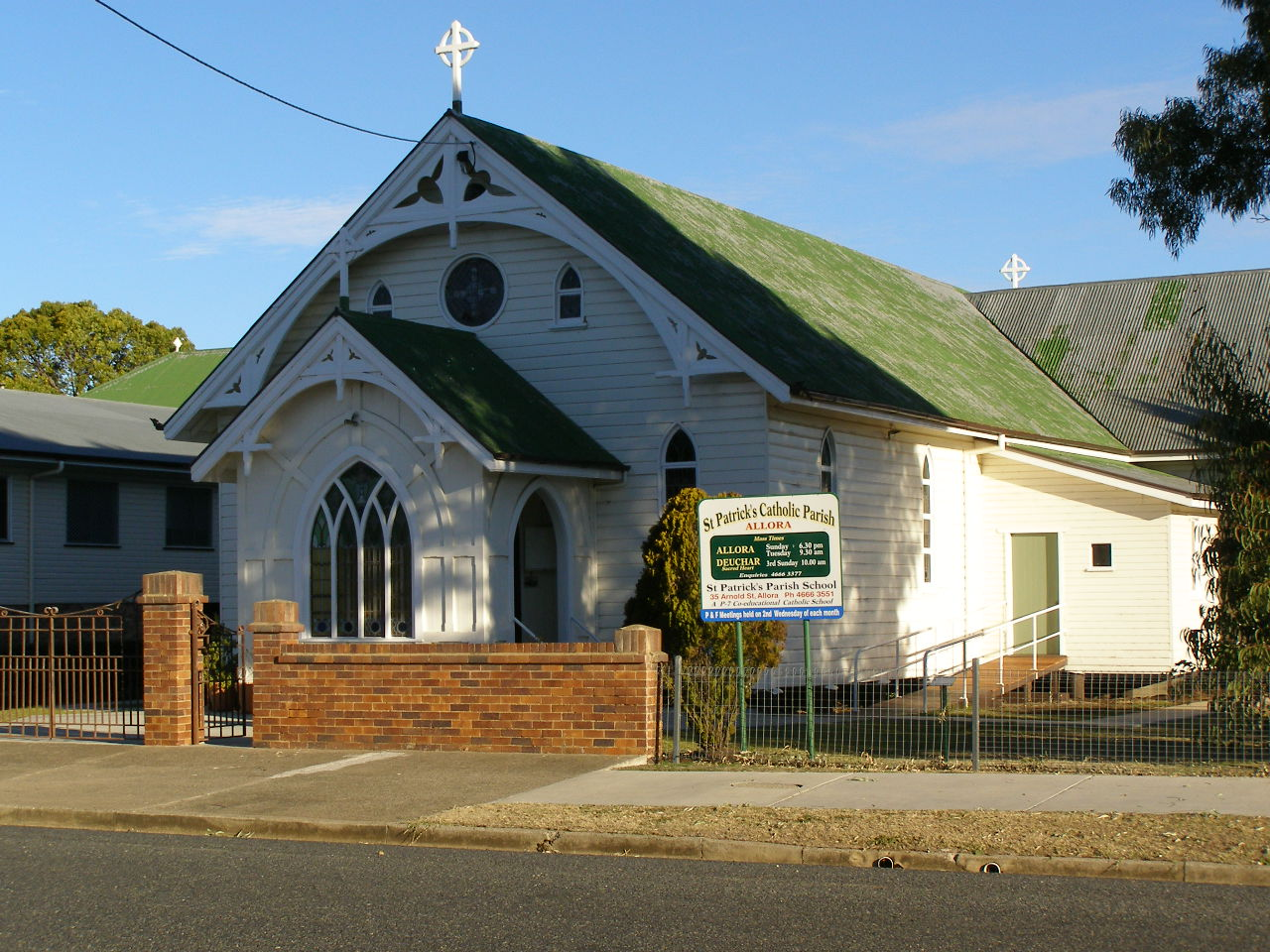
St Patrick's Catholic Church, 2007

The Southern Downs Regional Council operates a public library in Allora at 78 Herbert Street.

The Allora branch of the Queensland Country Women's Association meets at 51 Warwick Street.

St David's Anglican Church is at 1 Church Street (28.0362°S 151.9892°E).

St Patrick's Catholic Church is at 63 Warwick Street (28.0354°S 151.9786°E).

St Andrew's Uniting Church is at 44 Warwick Street (28.0351°S 151.9812°E).

== Attractions ==
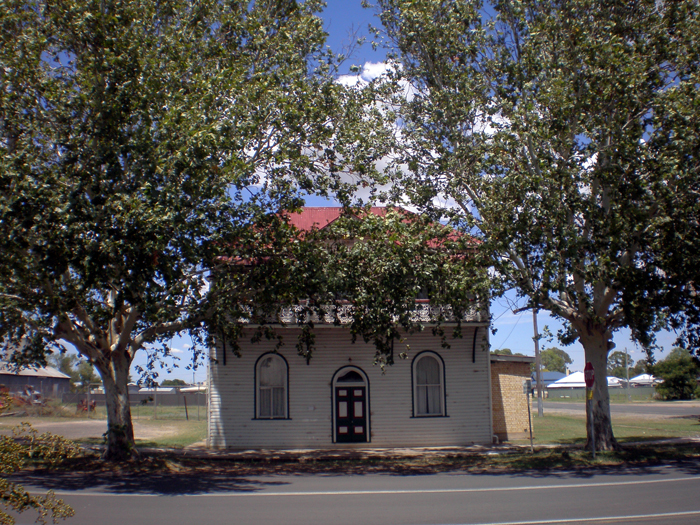
Museum

Local attractions include the Goomburra Forest Reserve, part of which was World Heritage listed in 1994 by UNESCO.

The Talgai skull is located in the Shellshear Museum, Department of Anatomy, Sydney University. A replica is found in the Allora Museum.

The old bank building in Herbert Street building is known locally as the "Mary Poppins house", after resident P. L. Travers' most famous work.

== Notable residents ==
- Wayne Bennett, Premiership winning rugby league coach in the NRL, born in Allora
- Sir James Connolly, politician in Western Australia, born in Allora
- Matthew Denny, IAAF Athletics 2013 World Youth Championships gold medallist discus throw, lived in Allora
- Laura Geitz, Australia National Netball Team Captain, Commonwealth Games Gold Medallist and ANZ Championships Premiership Captain
- Greg Holmes, Rugby Union tighthead prop. Queensland 'Reds' 144 games; Australia 28 Tests 2005–2021
- Private John Leak, Victoria Cross recipient at Pozières, France, on 23 July 1916. Farmed and worked in the Allora district, "The Commonage" Berat, from 1919 to 1920.
- John McVeigh, son of former Federal politician Tom McVeigh. (born 13 May 1965 in Allora, QLD) is an Australian former politician. He was elected to the House of Representatives at the 2016 federal election, representing the Division of Groom.
- Tom McVeigh, Born on 7 May 1930, Allora. Federal Member for Darling Downs for the National Country Party (1972–1984 when seat abolished). Member for Groom (1984–1988). Minister for Housing and Construction and Minister for Home Affairs and the Environment.
- P. L. Travers, author of Mary Poppins
