= Richard George Suter =

Australian architect (1827 - 1894)

Richard George Suter (25 April 1827 – 22 July 1894) was an English architect who migrated to Queensland, Australia. Many of his buildings are now heritage-listed.

== Early life ==
Suter was baptised on 6 July 1827 at Holy Trinity Church, Newington, Surrey, the son of Richard Suter, an architect, and his wife Anne. His birth on 25 April of that year was recorded. He graduated as a Bachelor of Arts at Trinity College, Cambridge, in 1850, then trained as an architect under his father in London.

== Architecture career ==
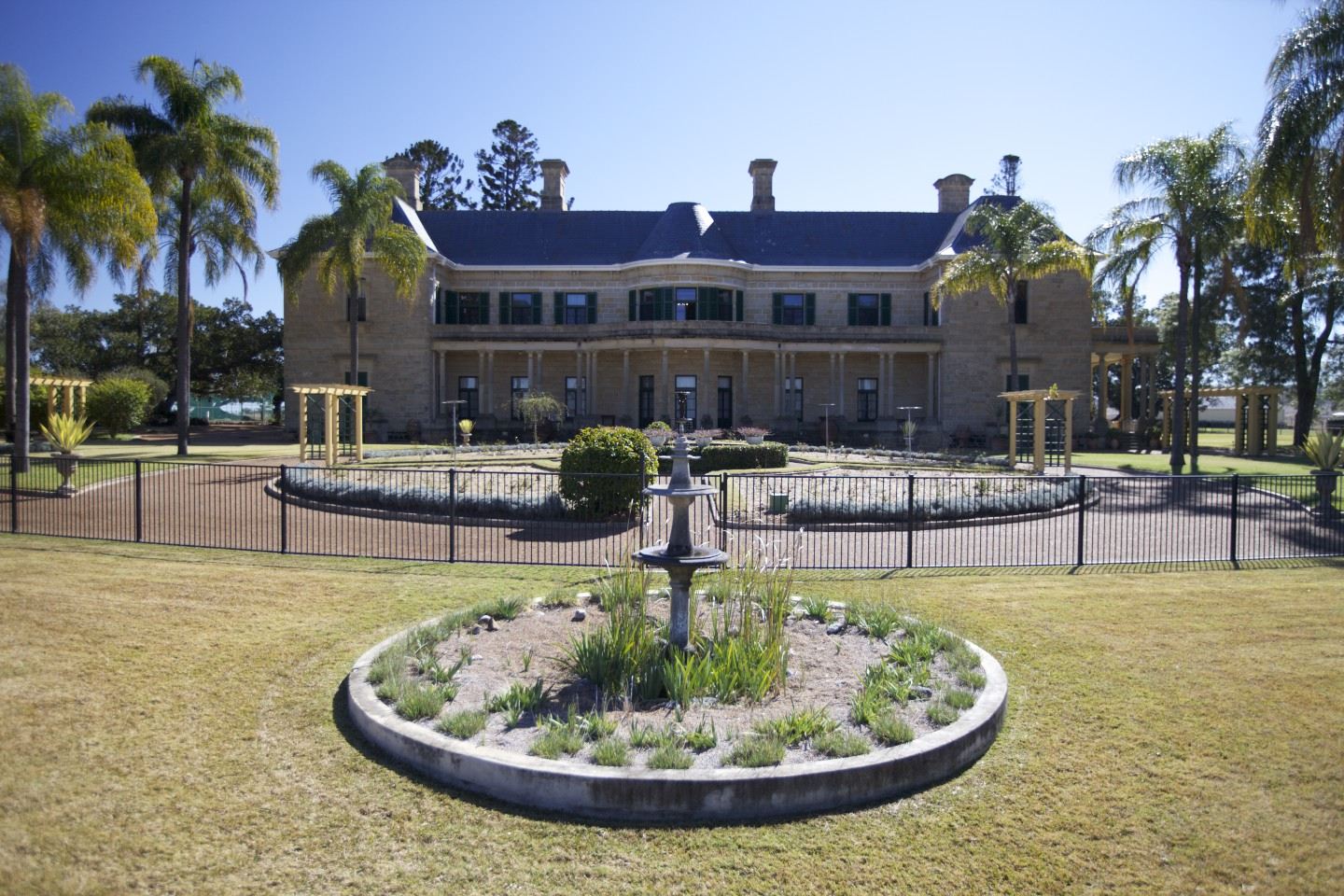
Jimbour House

By 1865 Suter was working for Brisbane's leading architect Benjamin Backhouse while establishing his own practice. Suter was one of Queensland's most prolific and prominent architects of the late 19th century and was responsible for such grand designs as Jimbour House (Suter & Voysey 1873), St Mark's Anglican Church, Warwick (1867–70) and is recognised for his influence on the standard designs of schools in Queensland with the Board of Education using his designs almost exclusively until 1875.

== Later life ==
After a decline in his success, Suter moved to Melbourne in 1876 and became a priest for the Catholic Apostolic Church. He died on 27 July 1894 at 114 Drummond Street, Carlton of heart disease.

== Significant works ==
- 1867–1870: St Mark's Anglican Church, Warwick
- 1868–1869: St James Anglican Church, Toowoomba
- 1871: St Augustines Anglican Church, Leyburn
- 1873: St Mary's Anglican Church, Kangaroo Point
