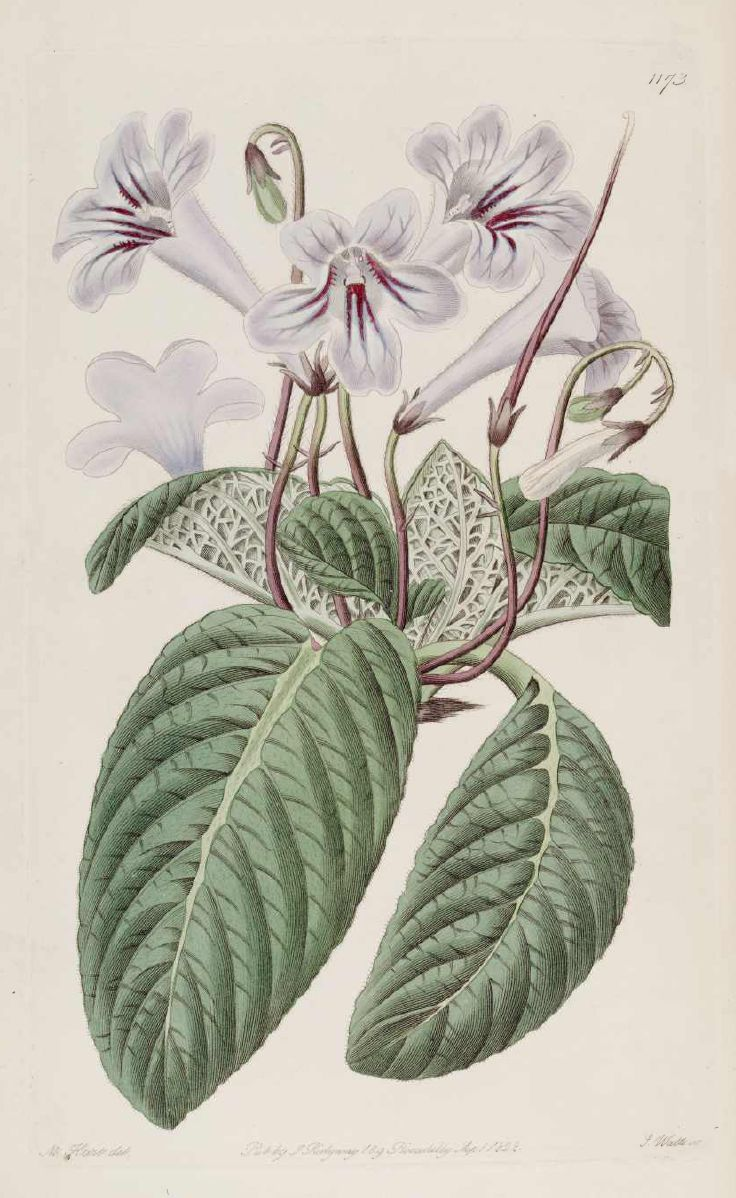
- Plate from The Botanical Register

Scientific classification
- Kingdom: Plantae
- Clade: Tracheophytes
- Clade: Angiosperms
- Clade: Eudicots
- Clade: Asterids
- Order: Lamiales
- Family: Gesneriaceae
- Genus: Streptocarpus
- Species: S. rexii

Binomial name
- Streptocarpus rexii (Bowie ex Hook.) Lindl.

Synonyms
- Didymocarpus rexii Bowie ex Hook.

= Streptocarpus rexii =

Species of flowering plant

Streptocarpus rexii is a South African plant in the family Gesneriaceae, occurring widely from the southern Cape along the coastal hills, mountains, wooded ravines and valleys, and moist forests of the east coast, through KwaZulu-Natal as far north as the Mpumalanga, up to an elevation of about 900 m. This genus of epiphytes and lithophytes, of about 130 species, is mainly African and Mascarene, with four vagrant species in Asia. Streptocarpus, as do other Old World Gesneriaceae, is unusual in that it displays anisocotylous or unequal growth, i.e. one cotyledon continues to grow after germination.

James Bowie, the Kew's botanical collector, first collected specimens and seeds of this plant in 1818 near Knysna on the estates of George Rex and sent these to Kew, asking that the plant be named after the legendary Rex. It was consequently named Didymocarpus rexii by William Jackson Hooker. John Lindley disagreed with Hooker's classification, creating a new genus and renaming the plant Streptocarpus rexii when he published plate 1173 in the 1828 edition of The Botanical Register. The botanist Gustav Heynhold also became involved and in 1840 published it as Henckelia rexii Heynh. in Nomenclator Botanicus Hortensis. Streptocarpus rexii is a stemless herb growing to a height of about 15 cm (6 in), and forming a rosette of velvety, strap-shaped leaves that are up to 30 cm (12 in) long. Each leaf grows separately from the base of the plant, becoming an individual plant with its own roots and inflorescence. The fruit is a spirally-twisted two-valved capsule releasing minute seeds when mature.

This species' showy flowers led to its being used as a parent in a spate of hybridisation starting in 1886, and resulting in a multitude of descendants with larger flowers and a wider range of colours. Both S. rexii and its hybrids proved to need little pampering in the gardens of Europe and the United States, making them perennially popular. Their resistance to dry conditions makes them ideal subjects for hanging baskets in greenhouses. As in Streptocarpus sect. Saintpaulia, propagation is readily done from leaf cuttings that are best taken in spring and early summer. Any sterile medium may be used provided it is well drained. The tips of the leaves will discolour and break off along abscission lines if stressed by cold or prolonged drought, though overwatering will encourage fungal growth.

Streptocarpus rhizomes show the presence of sterols, organic acids and phenols.
