= Strep =

Strep may refer to:

- Streptococcus, a genus of bacteria
- Streptococcal pharyngitis, an infectious disease commonly called "strep throat"
- Streptocarpus, a genus of flowering plants
- Streptomycin, an antibiotic
- Specific Targeted Research Project (STReP), a type of medium-sized research project funded by the European Commission
