= Streptocarpus lineatus =

Conservation status
- Vulnerable (IUCN 3.1)

Scientific classification
- Kingdom: Plantae
- Clade: Tracheophytes
- Clade: Angiosperms
- Clade: Eudicots
- Clade: Asterids
- Order: Lamiales
- Family: Gesneriaceae
- Genus: Streptocarpus
- Species: S. lineatus

Binomial name
- Streptocarpus lineatus (B.L.Burtt) Mich.Möller & M.Hughes

Species of flowering plant

Streptocarpus lineatus, synonym Nodonema lineatum, is a species of plant in the family Gesneriaceae. It is found in Cameroon and Nigeria. Its natural habitat is subtropical or tropical moist lowland forests. It is threatened by habitat loss.
