= Streptocarpus glandulosissimus =

Scientific classification
- Kingdom: Plantae
- Clade: Embryophytes
- Clade: Tracheophytes
- Clade: Spermatophytes
- Clade: Angiosperms
- Clade: Eudicots
- Clade: Asterids
- Order: Lamiales
- Family: Gesneriaceae
- Genus: Streptocarpus
- Species: S. glandulosissimus

Binomial name
- Streptocarpus glandulosissimus Engl.

Synonyms
- List: Streptocarpus bequaertii De Wild.; Streptocarpus mildbraedii Engl.; Streptocarpus ruwenzoriensis Baker; Streptocarpus smithii C.B.Clarke; Streptocarpus tchenzemae Gilli; Streptocarpus volkensii Engl.

Species of flowering plant

Streptocarpus glandulosissimus, called the Cape primrose (along with other members of its subgenus Streptocarpus), is a species of flowering plant in the genus Streptocarpus, native to the central African lakes region; eastern Democratic Republic of the Congo, Uganda, Rwanda, Burundi, Tanzania and Kenya. It has gained the Royal Horticultural Society's Award of Garden Merit.
