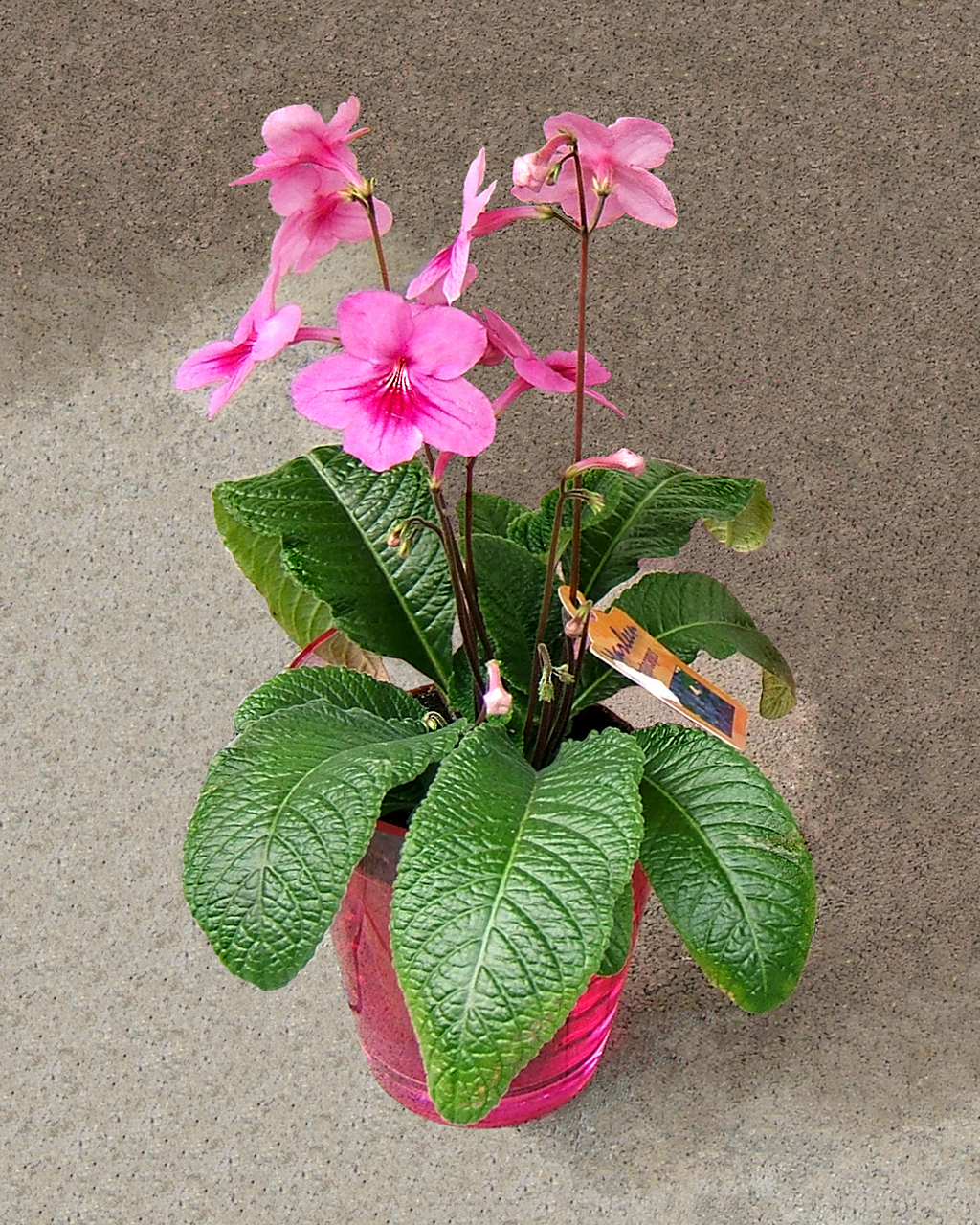
- A Streptocarpus hybrid

Scientific classification
- Kingdom: Plantae
- Clade: Tracheophytes
- Clade: Angiosperms
- Clade: Eudicots
- Clade: Asterids
- Order: Lamiales
- Family: Gesneriaceae
- Subfamily: Didymocarpoideae
- Genus: Streptocarpus; Lindl. (1828)

Species
- 184; see text

Synonyms
- Acanthonema Hook.f. (1862); Carolofritschia Engl. (1899); Colpogyne B.L.Burtt (1971); Hovanella A.Weber & B.L.Burtt (1997-1998 publ. 1998); Linnaeopsis Engl. (1900); Nodonema B.L.Burtt (1981 publ. 1982); Saintpaulia H.Wendl. (1893); Schizoboea (Fritsch) B.L.Burtt (1974); Trachystigma C.B.Clarke (1883)

= Streptocarpus =

Genus of plants

Streptocarpus (from Ancient Greek στρεπτός (streptós), "twisted", and καρπός (karpós), "fruit") is an Afrotropical genus of flowering plants in the family Gesneriaceae. The genus is native to Afromontane biotopes from central, eastern and southern Africa, including Madagascar and the Comoro Islands. The flowers are five-petalled, salverform tubes, almost orchid-like in appearance, and hover or arch over the plant, while the pointed, elongate fruit is of a helical form similar to that of the "tusk" of a narwhal. In the wild, species can be found growing on shaded rocky hillsides or cliffs, on the ground, in rock crevices, and almost anywhere the seed can germinate and grow. For the home, there are now many hybrids of various colours and forms available.

Although generally referred to simply as "Streptocarpus" or "Streps", the common name for subgenus Streptocarpus is Cape primrose, referring to the nativity of several species to South Africa and their superficial resemblance to the unrelated genus Primula. The common name for subgenus Streptocarpella is nodding violet. Streptocarpus sect. Saintpaulia ("African violet") is a separate section within Streptocarpus subgenus Streptocarpella.

DNA studies have shown that, despite not having a twisted fruit, African violets evolved from within the Tanzanian Streptocarpus subgenus Streptocarpella.

There are a few Asian species that have recently been removed from the genus, most notably Streptocarpus orientalis, now reclassified as Damrongia orientalis. Molecular systematics has shown conclusively that they are not true Streptocarpus.

== Description ==
There are two subgenera within Streptocarpus, namely subgenus Streptocarpus and subgenus Streptocarpella.

=== Subgenus Streptocarpus ===
Within the Streptocarpus subgenus Streptocarpus, there are two main forms, the plurifoliates and the unifoliates.

Streptocarpus with more than one leaf are called "plurifoliates", and there are two main types of these. First is the rosulate form, which is perennial. Rosulates are made up of a basal rosette of leaves. Flower stems sprout from the upper surfaces of the bases of these leaves. The most common Streptocarpus houseplant is of the rosulate type. The flowers of modern rosulate hybrids are generally three to several centimeters in diameter. The other plurifoliate type is essentially somewhere in between a rosulate and a unifoliate. In this group, two or three leaves grow in addition to the first leaf. The plurifoliates are perennial. Examples are Streptocarpus prolixus, and Streptocarpus polyanthus ssp polyanthus.

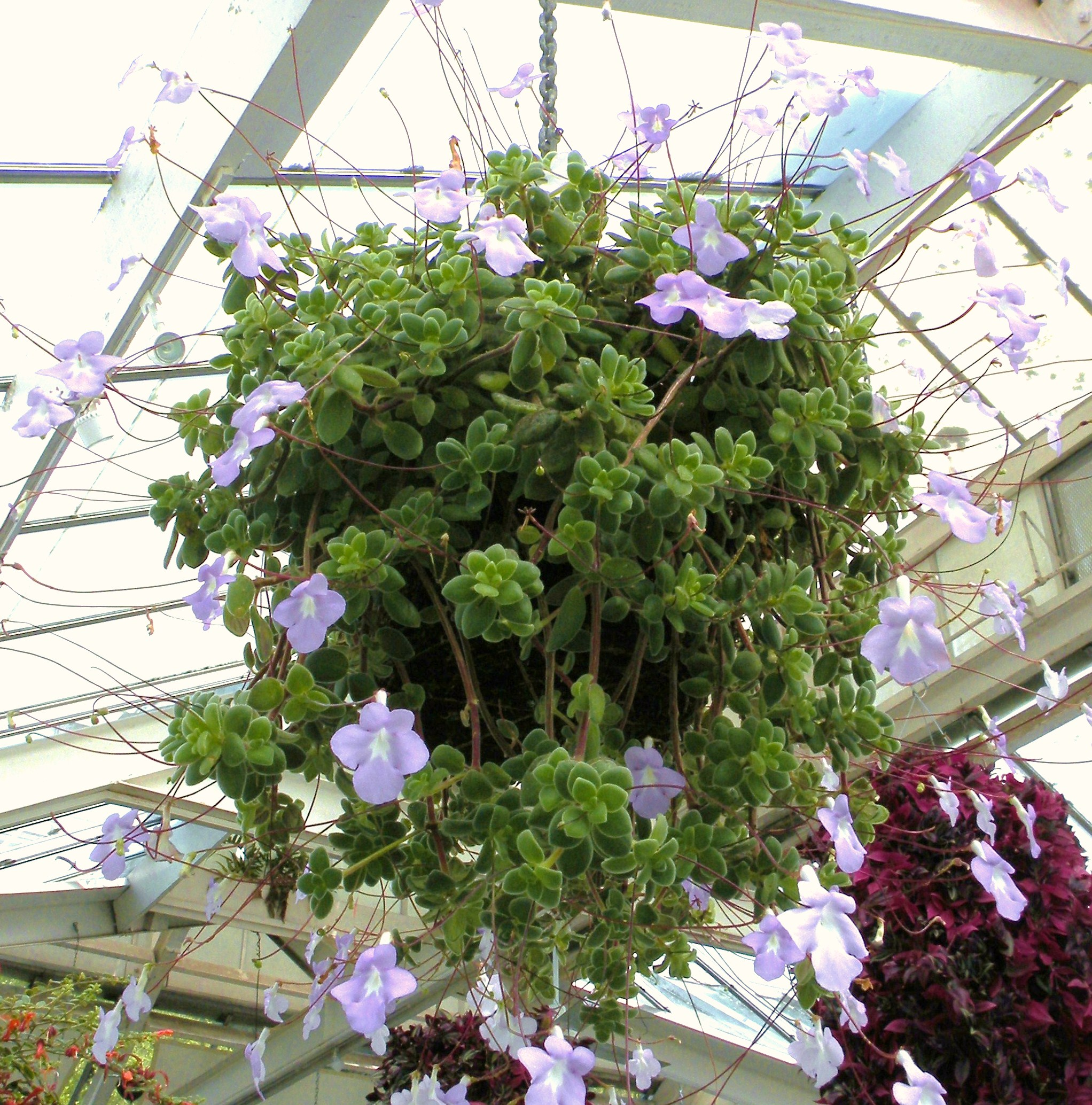
Streptocarpella (Streptocarpus saxorum)

The second form is the unifoliate, which only has one leaf. In the unifoliates group, one single leaf grows continuously from the base. Many unifoliates are also monocarpic, which means that they will flower once, set seed, then die. But they may take a few years to reach this stage. In other unifoliates, the original leaf may die, but one or two new leaves will sprout from it, and the plant continues to grow.

This subgenus (comprising plurifoliates and unifoliates) is unique in that, in winter, they can form abscission lines part way down the leaf (see photo gallery below). The leaf then dies back to this point, whilst the proximal part of the leaf stays alive and healthy. In unifoliate species, the remaining healthy portion of that leaf will start to grow again from the base.

=== Subgenus Streptocarpella ===
Members of the Streptocarpus subgenus Streptocarpella are very different in form to those mentioned above.

The flowers and seed pods are similar, but the leaves and stems are caulescent (have stems). Streptocarpellas are generally clump-forming or trailing plants. Their flowers are only about 2.5-3.5 cm in diameter, and their colour range seems to be limited to mid-purples, pale pinks, and white.

Streptocarpella leaves can be decussate in arrangement (each pair of leaves at a node is at 90 degrees to the ones preceding or following it), or ternate (whorls of 3 leaves at each node). Some specimens may exhibit both on the same plant. Streptocarpella are grown as houseplants, hanging plants, and sometimes as bedding plants.

These two Streptocarpus subgenera do not interbreed.

For information on Streptocarpus subgenus Streptocarpella section Saintpaulia, see Streptocarpus sect. Saintpaulia.

=== Flower anatomy ===
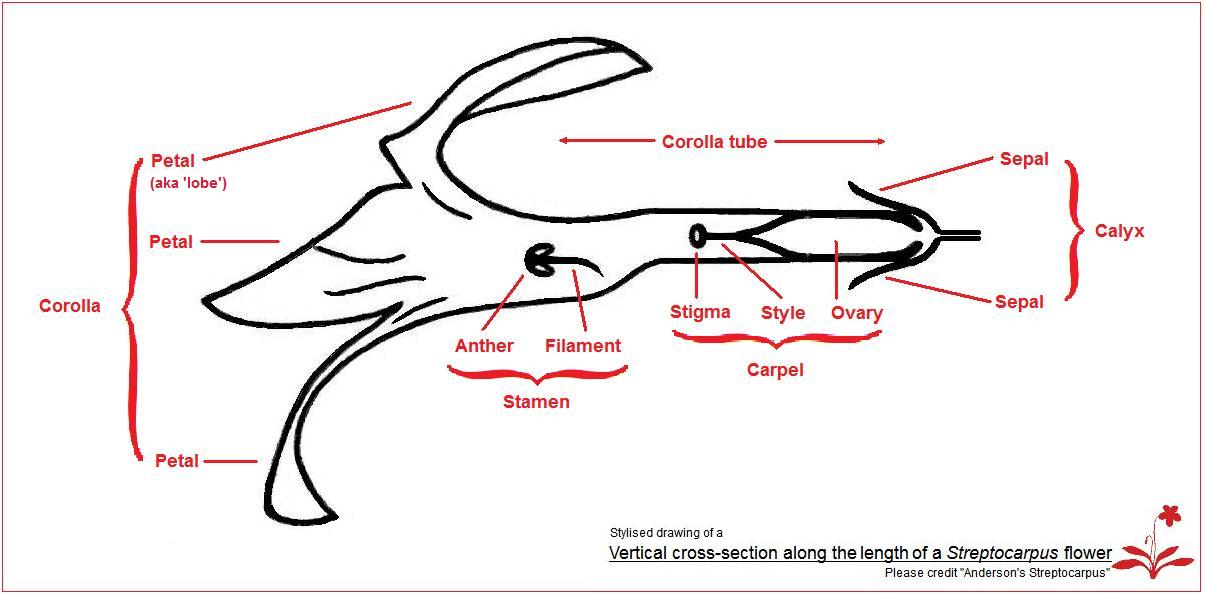
Streptocarpus anatomy - cross section of flower

Streptocarpus flowers are five-lobed, salverform, zygomorphic tubes. The diagram at the right shows a labelled drawing of a vertical cross-section along the length of a Streptocarpus flower.

The two anthers (each arising from one filament on each side of the flower) are loosely joined together. As the anthers mature, they open slightly and act like a pepper shaker, which means that not all the pollen is released at once.

Streptocarpus flowers have evolved to be pollinated by birds, long-tongued flies, butterflies and probably long-tongued moths and bees. Although almost any small insect, animal, or breeze could potentially pollinate Streptocarpus. Streptocarpus flowers often have nectar guidelines that guide would-be pollinators to the nectar (and anthers and stigmas). Self-pollination is also common.

== Species ==
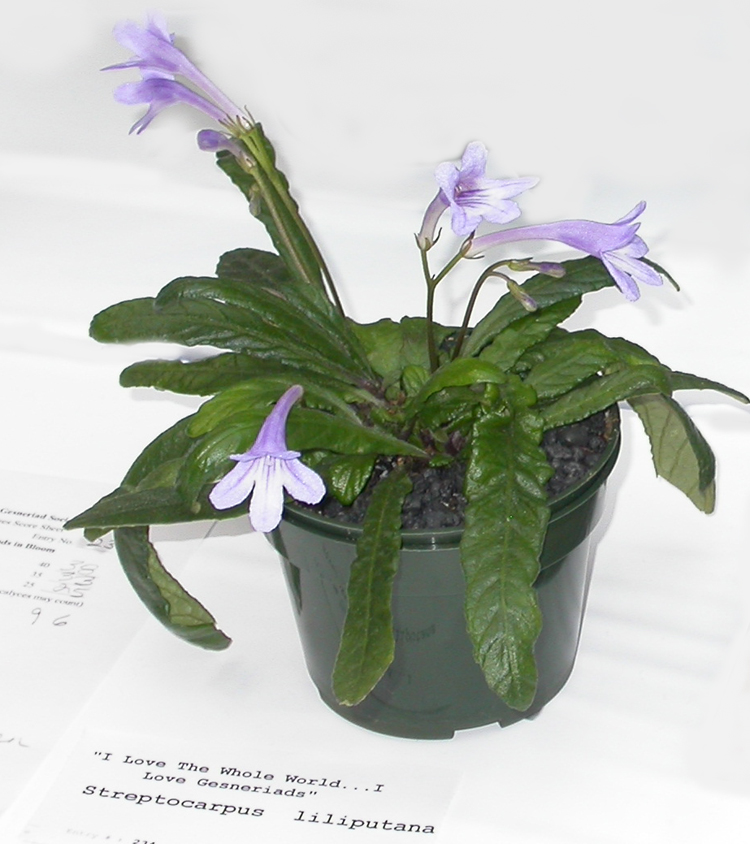
Streptocarpus liliputana, whole plant, on show

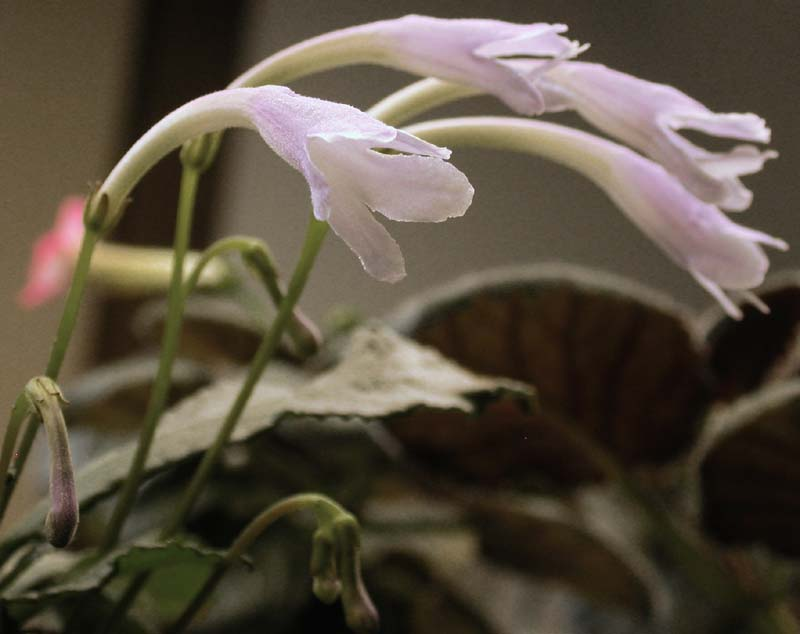
Streptocarpus liliputana flowers, close-up

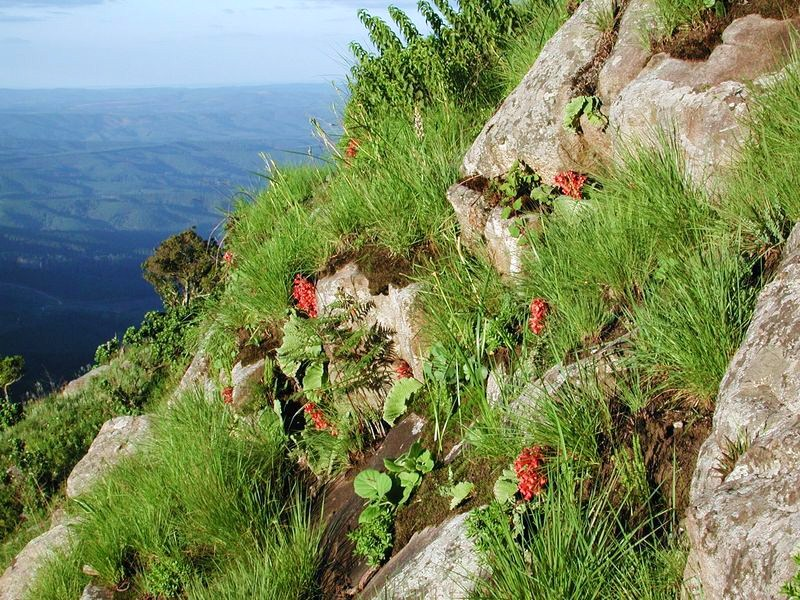
Streptocarpus dunii

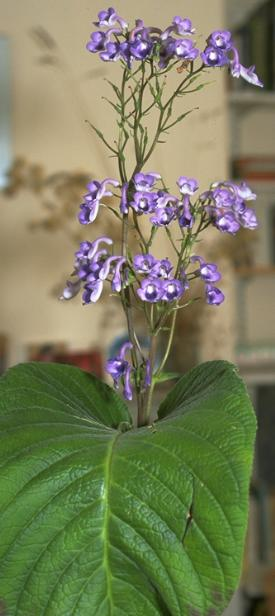
Streptocarpus eylsii, a unifoliate

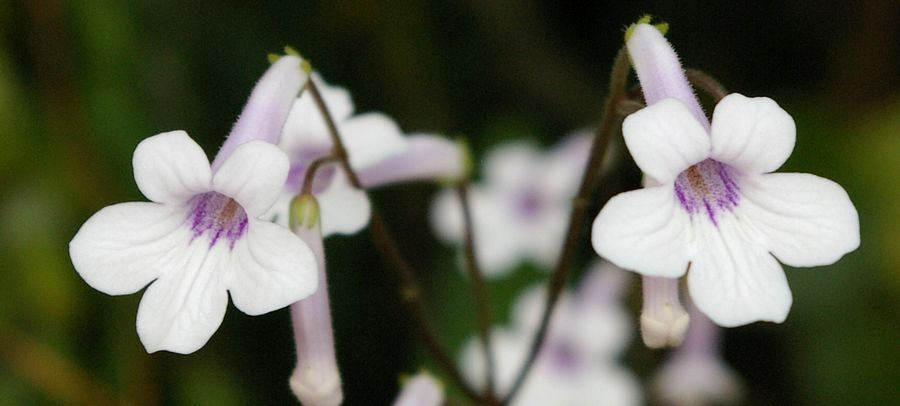
Streptocarpus kentaniensis flowers

184 species of Streptocarpus are currently recognized. Streptocarpus rexii is the first species described.

A complete list of the species and their synonyms can be found at the Smithsonian's World Checklist of Gesneriaceae.

A list of selected species from representative locales follows:

- S. andohahelensis Humbert (Madagascar)
- S. candidus Hilliard - scented (South Africa, Natal)
- S. caulescens Vatke (Kenya, Tanzania)
- S. confusus Hilliard (South Africa)
- S. cooperi C.B.Clarke (South Africa)
- S. cyaneus S. Moore (South Africa, Transvaal)
- S. denticulatus (South Africa)
- S. dolomiticus - in the process of being described (origin unknown)
- S. dunnii Hook. f. (South Africa)
- S. elongatus Engl. (Cameroon, San Thomé Island, Sudan)
- S. eylsii S.Moore - scented (Zimbabwe, Malawi, Mozambique, Zambia)
- S. fanniniae Harv. Ex C. B. Cl. - scented (South Africa)
- S. fenestra-dei Weigend & T.J.Edwards (South Africa, Transvaal)
- S. formosus (Hilliard & B.L.Burtt) T.J.Edwards (South Africa)
- S. gardenii Hook. (South Africa, Natal)
- S. glandulosissimus Engl. (Burundi, Congo, Kenya, Rwanda, Tanzania, Uganda)
- S. insularis Hutch. & Dalziel (West Africa: Fernando Po Island)
- S. kentaniensis L.L.Britten & Story (Congo)
- S. liliputana D.U.Bellstedt & T.J.Edwards (Pondoland in Eastern Cape, South Africa)
- S. meyeri B.L. Burtt (South Africa)
- S. milanjianus Hilliard & B.L.Burtt (Malawi)
- S. modestus L.L.Britten (South Africa)
- S. pentherianus (South Africa)
- S. polyanthus Hook. (South Africa)
- S. pusillus Harv. ex C.B.Clarke (South Africa)
- S. revivescens Humbert ex B.L.Burtt (Madagascar)
- S. rexii (Bowie ex Hook.) Lindl. (South Africa)
- S. rhodesianus S.Moore (Angola, Katanga, Zambia)
- S. saxorum Engl. (Kenya, Tanzania)
- S. trabeculatus Hilliard (South Africa)
- S. vandeleurii Baker f. & S.Moore - scented (South Africa)
- S. variabilis Humbert (Madagascar, Comoro Islands, Anjouan Island)
- S. wilmsii Engl. (South Africa)
- S. zimmermannii Engl. (Tanzania)

== Cultivation ==
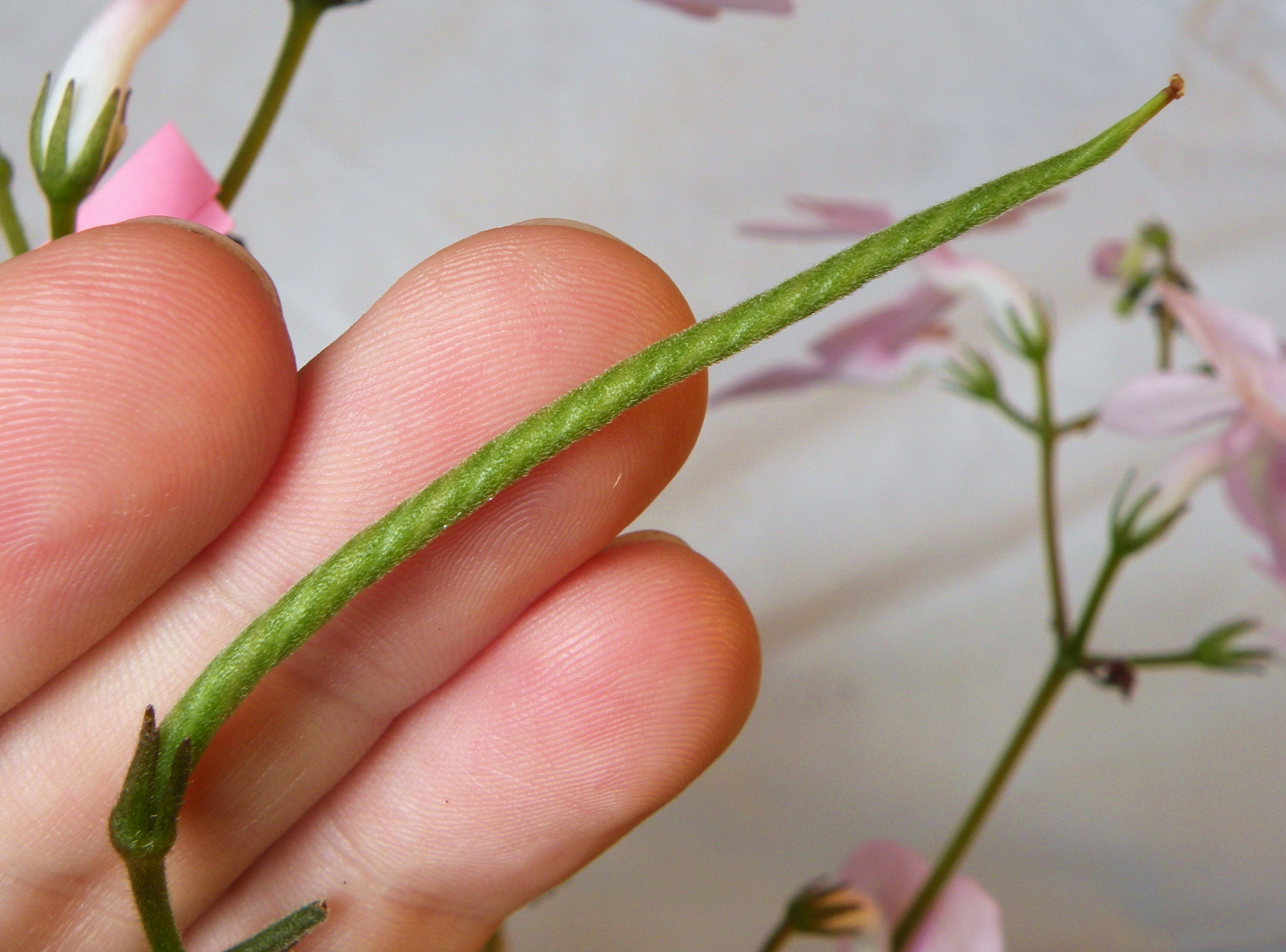
Streptocarpus seed capsule, showing "twisted" (helical) form referenced in the genus name - this being derived from the Greek for "twisted fruit"

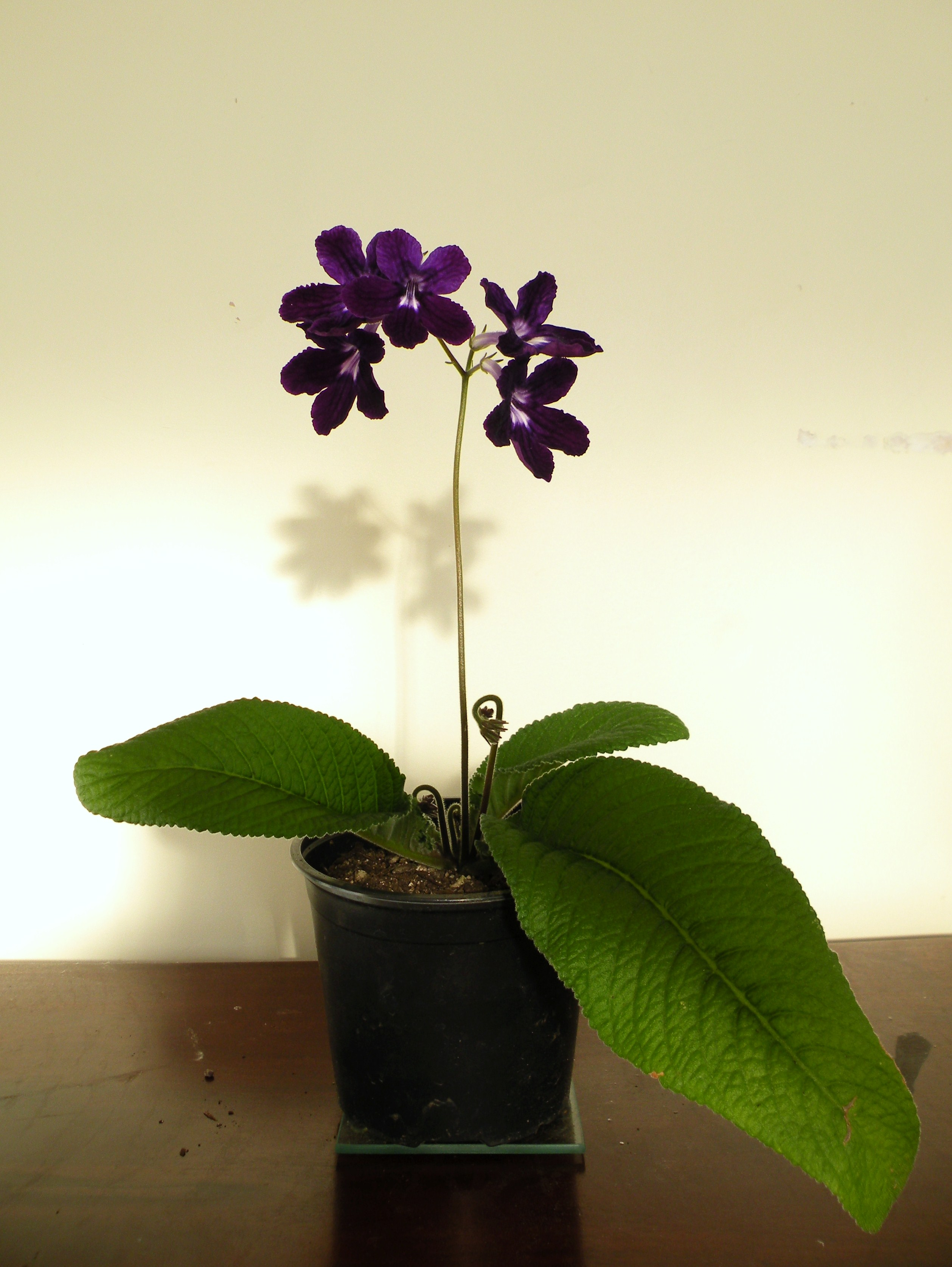
Young rosulate Streptocarpus, whole plant

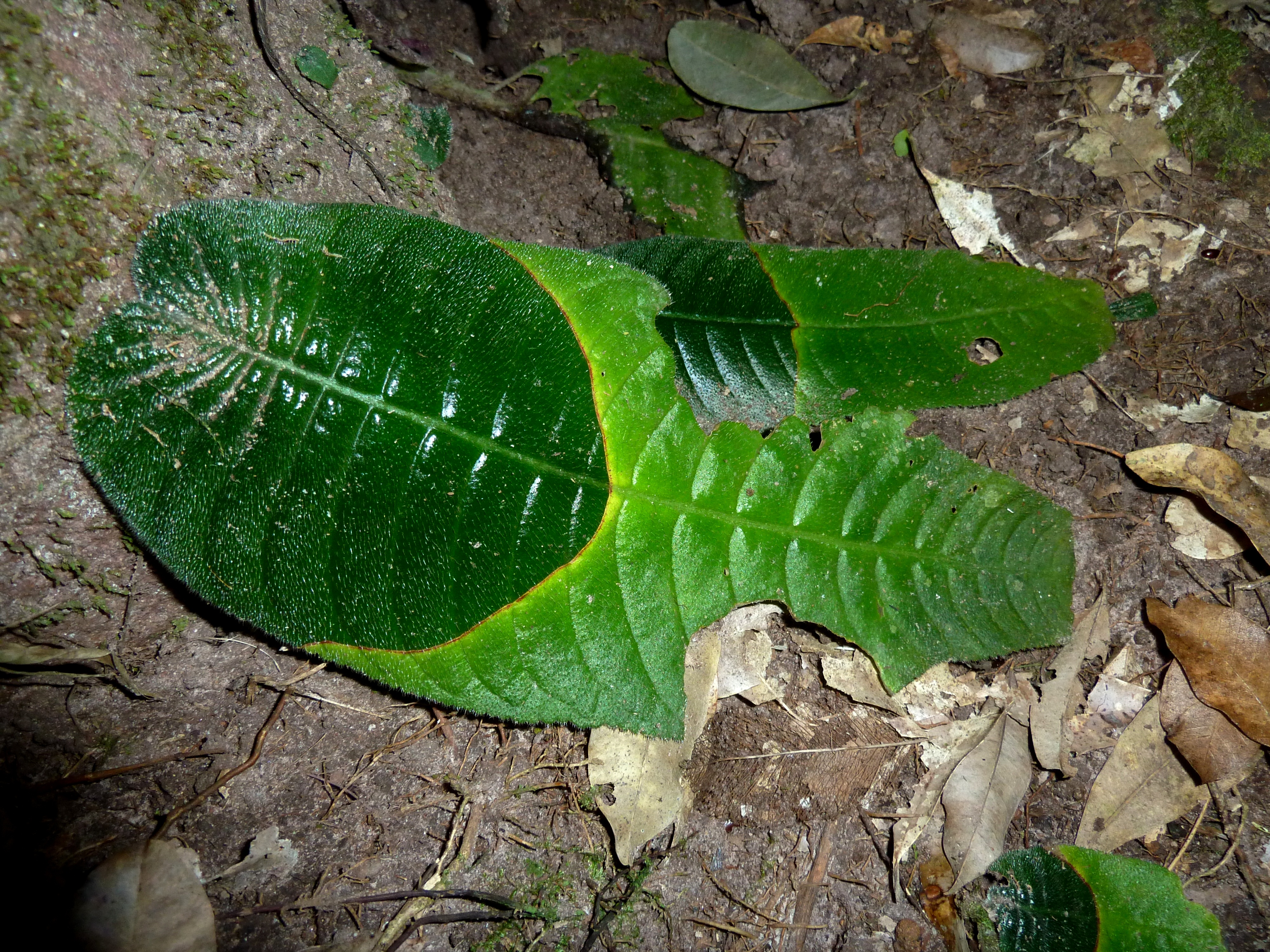
Streptocarpus molweniensis with clear abscission lines midway down the leaves

Each grower will have their own preferences for cultivation. The details given below are a tested general guide, but Streptocarpus will do quite well on either side of these optimums.

The two main things to remember when growing Streptocarpus are that they do not like soil that is too wet, and they do not like it too hot.

Soil: Use an ordinary potting mix with 1/8 to 1/4 perlite mixed in. This ensures the soil will retain the correct amount of moisture. Always have adequate drainage holes at the bottom of the pot in use.

Temperature: 18–25 °C (64–77 °F). They can be taken down to 10 °C (50 °F) or less in winter for a rest.

Light: Medium to bright indirect light is best. However, a bit of morning/late afternoon sun is more than okay. Even in dimmer light, they will flower - but less floriferously.

Water: Water only once the soil is almost dry. Some growers prefer to water only when the leaves have just started to wilt (or just before). They recover very well from dehydration, and this is one of the traits of the species. Make sure the pot has holes in the bottom to drain water, and never leave the pots sitting in a saucer of water.

Feeding: Feed occasionally with a "fruit and flower" or general fertilizer.

Seasons: Generally, Streptocarpus will flower from spring to autumn. In winter, they will stop flowering and may lose some leaves, which is normal. However, some varieties flower in winter.

Pruning of leaves & flowers: You may slice off yellowing or browned leaves at the base - these will be the older leaves naturally dying off. If there is a healthy leaf with some blemishing, you can successfully cut off only the blemished parts and trim the leaf to a normal shape. With regards to flowers, snip off individuals as they finish, then snip the whole stem off at the base once the last flower on that stem is spent.

Cut flowers: Streptocarpus flowers also make excellent cut flowers, especially the long-stemmed varieties. They last well.

Pests and diseases: Streptocarpus are generally pest and disease-free. However, the most common afflictions are aphids and mealybugs. These are easily treatable with commercial insecticides or cultural pest removal methods.

Leaves and abscission: It is common for older leaves to die off occasionally, but especially in winter. They may be snipped off. New leaves will replace them.

The leaves of some perennial, but usually unifoliate Streptocarpus, are unusual because, as winter approaches, they slowly die back to an abscission line midway down the leaf. The end portion of the leaf will gradually die back to this line. In most flowering plants, an abscission line forms at the base of the leaf, and the whole leaf will fall off (e.g. the leaves of deciduous trees like oak).

== Propagation ==
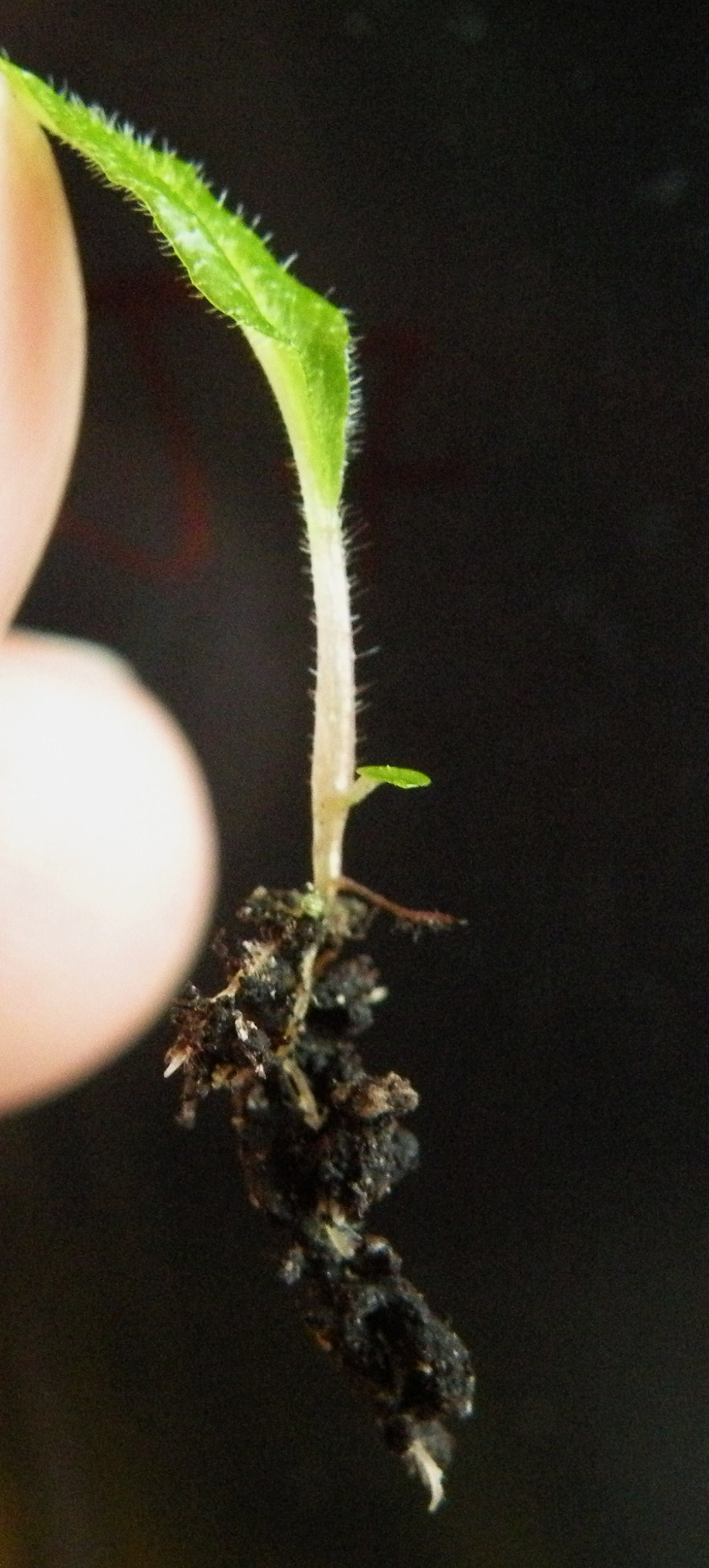
Streptocarpus seedling showing normally rudimentary second cotyledon

Propagation is usually either by seed or leaf cuttings. Some species produce plantlets from the roots, which can be used to propagate the plant. Mature clumps of plants can also be divided up and repotted.

Streptocarpus species seed that has been self-pollinated will grow true to type.

Self-pollinated hybrid seed will not grow true to type. The only way to propagate hybrid plants and retain the characteristics of the hybrid, is by leaf propagation (or other types of vegetative cloning)

For Streptocarpus subgenus Streptocarpus:

By seed: Streptocarpus seed is generally very fine (see image gallery below). To germinate, the seed must be scattered thinly on top of potting mix, as they require light to germinate. The pot they are sown in must be covered in clear plastic “cling film” to keep up the humidity. Keep the sown seed where it will get bright, indirect light, and remain about 18-20 degrees Celsius. Keep them out of direct sunlight.

By leaf:

A Streptocarpus leaf can be severed at the base, taking some petiole (but above where flowers arise), and potted, base-down, in a few centimetres of potting mix. Place a clear plastic bag over the pot and secure with a rubber band to keep up the humidity.

- You can also put leaves cut in this way in a glass of water to root (change water weekly).

Leaf segments, cut either horizontally across the leaf, or length-wise along the leaf (removing the midrib), can be used as cuttings in much the same way. Place the segments cut-side down in soil, as above. For unifoliates, this method is apparently less successful, but not impossible. However, it must be done before the plant flowers.

Streptocarpus leaves have a high concentration of cytokinin (a type of rooting hormone), so the use of artificial rooting hormones is unnecessary.

By root plantlet: Un-pot a plant that you know is susceptible to producing root plantlets (e.g. Streptocarpus johannis, and its sports ‘Falling Stars’ and 'Gloria'. You will see, once the roots are exposed, whether any plantlets have formed between the soil and pot.

Sometimes, these plantlets will be evident growing out of the holes at the bottom of the pot. You can then snip these plantlets off (preferably with their attached roots), and plant up as for leaf propagation above).

By clump division: You can divide a multi-crown clump into pieces (each with a root system), and plant up as for leaf propagation above.

For Streptocarpus subgenus Streptocarpella:

By seed: Streptocarpus seed is generally very fine. To germinate, the seed must be scattered thinly on top of potting mix, as they require light to germinate. The pot they are sown in must be covered in clear plastic “cling film” to keep up the humidity. Keep the sown seed where it will get bright, indirect light, and remain about 18-20 degrees Celsius. Keep them out of direct sunlight.

By stem cuttings: Cuttings of about 5–10 cm can be taken beneath a leaf node. When the cutting is placed in clean water, it will sprout roots. Keep the cuttings in bright, indirect light at about 18-20 degrees Celsius. Once the roots are about 5 cm long, you can pot up the cutting into the soil mixture mentioned above.

== Hybridisation ==
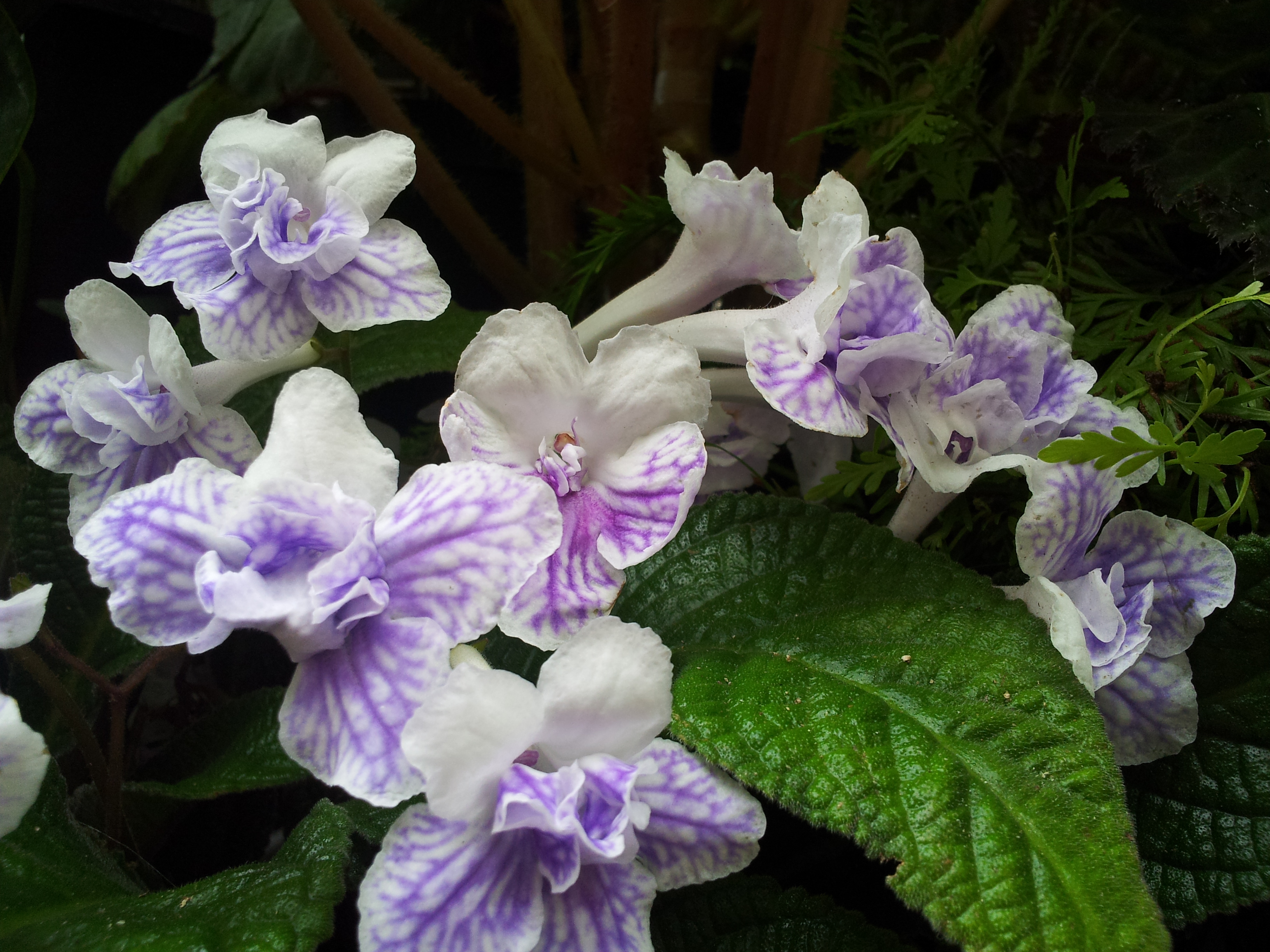
Streptocarpus 'Chorus Line' - a double-flowered variety

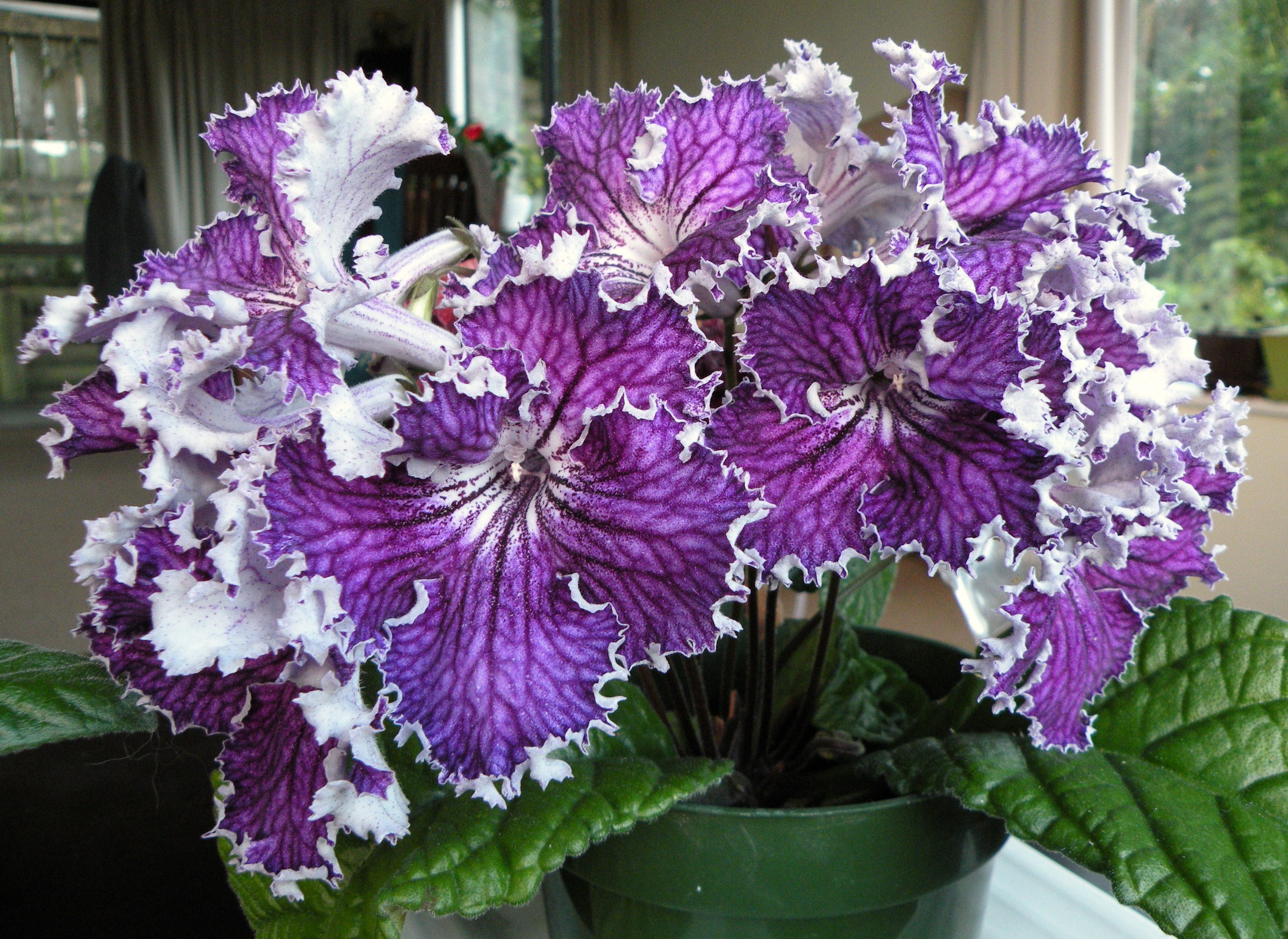
Streptocarpus 'DS-Heart of Kai' - a variety created in Ukraine

Hybridisation of Streptocarpus is conceptually very simple. The pollen of one plant (therefore the father) is placed onto the tip of the stigma of another plant (the mother). To prevent unwanted self-pollination of the mother plant, carefully remove its anthers beforehand. To help prevent unwanted cross-pollination, cover the newly fertilized stigma with a small plastic bag. If fertilization was successful, the seed pod will start to elongate within a few days. As the pod grows, it will start showing its namesake twisted form. Once the pod is mature, it will turn brown, dry off, and split open along the spiralled seams to release the seeds.

Another method that is used to create hybrids is to use radiation or chemicals to alter the genes. For example, irradiation may be used (e.g. xrays, gamma rays) to induce mutations that may give rise to plants with new characteristics. Another example is the use of colchicine to induce polyploidy (multiplying number of chromosomes) in plants, also to introduce new traits.

Over the years, numerous hybrids have been produced. S. rexii was used in many of the early hybrids, and its form is one that we most recognize in modern-day hybrids. But more recent hybrids may contain the genes of other species or hybrids. When making a cross, hybridizers keep in mind which traits they wish to bring out or improve in the progeny.

Much hybridizing work has been done to produce modern hybrids with an increased range of flower colours and forms, leaf variations, increased flowering periods, and more recently to introduce scent. Thanks to the work of hybridizers, Streptocarpus now come in a range of colours. These include reds, pinks, purples, blues, yellows, whites, and near-blacks. The only colour that is so-far not available is a true orange.

Flowers now exist that are multicoloured, striped, spotted, veined, double, larger or smaller, and even fragrant and colour-changing. There are also variegated-leaf varieties, such as S. 'Canterbury Surprise'. Flower stems may be short or tall; leaves may be big or small; flowers may be full or dainty; and there may be one or many flowers per stem.

=== AGM cultivars ===
The following hybrid cultivars have gained the Royal Horticultural Society's Award of Garden Merit:-

- 'Bethan' (violet-blue, striped)
- 'Blue Frills'
- 'Burgundy Ice' (burgundy edged white)
- 'Carys' (lavender/purple)
- 'Charlotte' (pale blue/yellow)
- 'Crystal Ice' (white veined with violet-blue)
- 'Falling Stars' (pale blue sport of S. johannis, very floriferous)
- 'Frosty Diamond' (white, blue, purple)
- 'Gloria' (pale pink)
- 'Hannah' (light pink/white)
- 'Harlequin Blue' (soft blue, yellow, purple line)
- 'Harlequin Lace' (pale blue, purple blotches on white)
- 'Jennifer' (pale violet-blue with darker veining)
- 'Jessica' (mid-pink)
- 'Katie' (white with purple blotches)
- 'Kim' (deep violet)
- 'Laura' (pale pink with maroon veining)
- 'Pearl' (white/yellow)
- 'Polka-Dot Purple'
- 'Rubina Rose' (mid-pink)
- 'Sioned' (magenta/pale pink)
- 'Snow White' (white, yellow throat)
- 'Stella' (pink with deeper veining)
- 'Susan' (magenta, yellow throat)
- 'Tina' (pink lower lobes deeper pink)
- 'White Butterfly'

=== Genes and inheritance ===
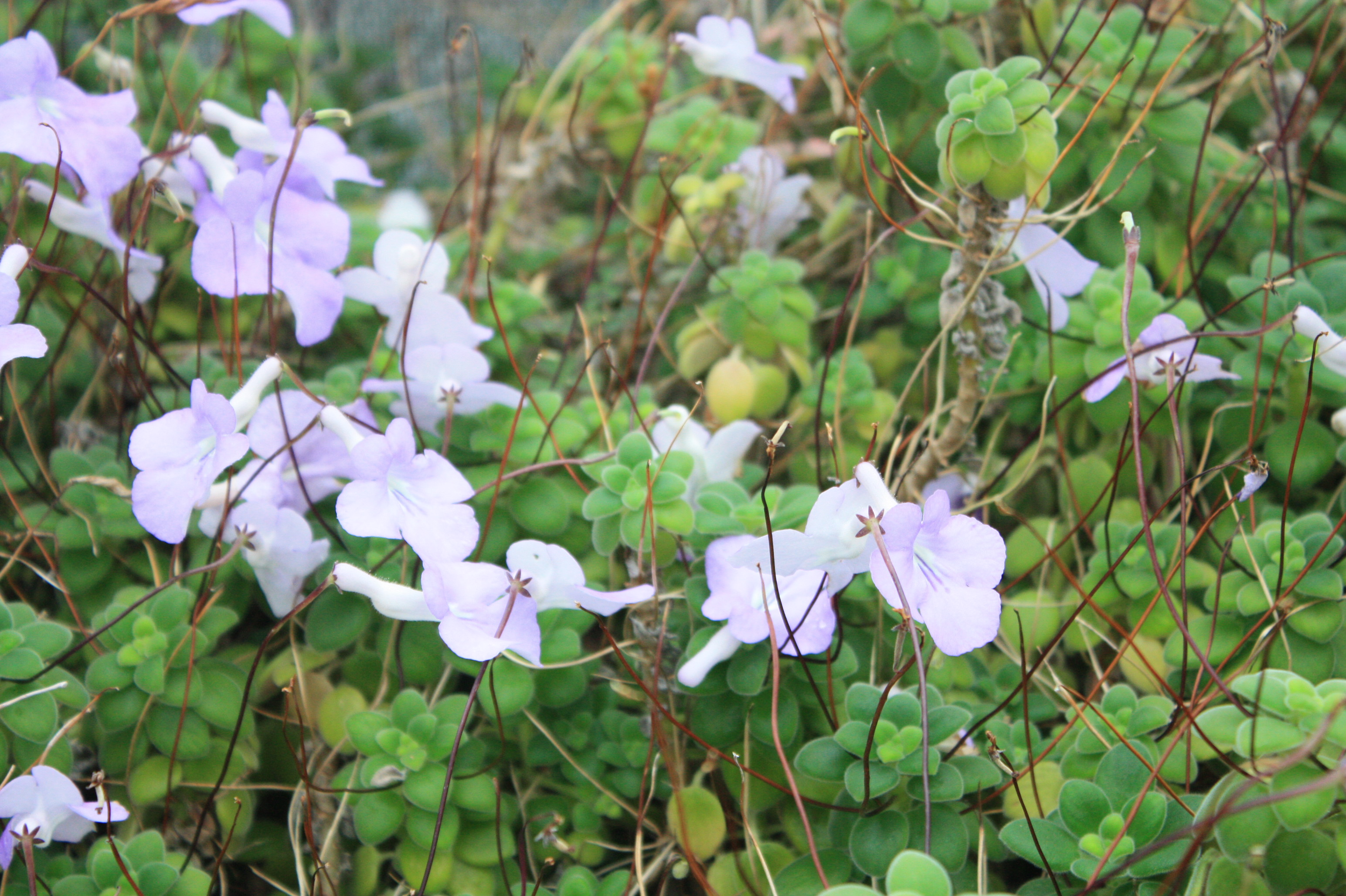
Streptocarpus saxorum in bloom

The following is a quick summary of 1950s publications by Lawrence and Sturgess,

Colour genes

V = places pigment in the flower stems

F = places pigment in the petal cells

V and F are both necessary to give colour, but do not control which colour. When V or F are recessive (vv or ff) the flowers will lack any colour and will be white in appearance.

I = colour intensity. II = intense colour, Ii = medium colour and ii = pale colour. This gene doesn't control "which colour", just how "intense" the final colour will be in appearance.

The actual flower colour genes are named O, R, and D. Where the second copy of the gene is given as a "_", the second copy can be either dominant or a recessive. For example, in blue flowers, only one dominant of each the three genes is needed (e.g. the O gene could be either OO or Oo, and it wouldn't matter which).

Blue = O_R_D_

Magenta = ooR_D_

Pink = oorrD_

Mauve = O_R_dd

Rose = ooR_dd

Salmon = oorrdd

Other genes affect the pattern of colour or modify the final colour. Some of these genes are:

B = gives a blotch of colour in the throat of the bloom. The recessive "bb" produces flowers without a blotch. The trait appears to produce a darker or more intense version of the colour of the outer edges of the petals. Thus, you can get dark pink blotches on a lighter pink flower etc.

H = gives colour on the capitate hairs of the pistil. The recessive "hh" gives white or colourless hairs.

Genes F, I, B, and H are very closely linked and are usually inherited as a single unit. Therefore, many plants have pigmented flowers with at least medium intensity of color, and blotches in the throat, or have white flowers without blotches.

C = adds a co-pigment to the flower colour. This gene modifies the appearance of the colour, giving a bluish tint to the overall colour. Plants with the recessive "cc" combination have flowers that are "brighter" in appearance. In the Mauve-Rose-Salmon series, the dominant gene produces undesirable murky colours.

L = puts nectar guides in the flower tubes. The recessive "ll" produces flowers without the lines.

Y = puts a yellow central stripe in the flower tube. I suspect that the size of the yellow area changes with "YY" versus "Yy" plants. The recessive "yy" would produce flowers with no yellow in the flower tube.

Other genes are mentioned in the original articles, but they appear to involve some rarely seen colour modifications. Genes for plant size, fragrance etc. were not mentioned in these articles.

== History of discovery and hybridisation ==
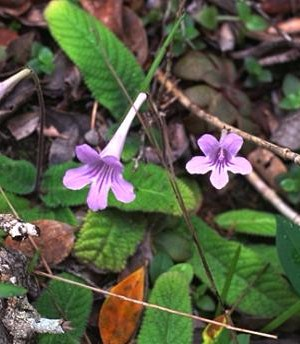
Streptocarpus rexii

The following is an adapted excerpt from the 1906 text "Hortus Veitchii":

The first Streptocarpus to reach British gardens was Streptocarpus rexii. This species was sent to Kew in 1824 by Mr Bowie, who was His Majesty’s collector in South Africa. The plant was found on the estate of Mr George Rex, after whom it was named.

Following Streptocarpus rexii came Streptocarous polyantha from Natal. It was accidentally introduced to Kew in 1853 in material surrounding trunks of tree ferns sent from Natal by Captain Garden.

Streptocarpus gardeni, also introduced in 1853 from the same country was named for Captain Garden, who sent seeds to Kew.

In 1860, Mr Wilson Saunders sent a specimen to Kew, and it was eventually named Streptocarpus saundersii.

In 1882, the caulescent species, Streptocarpus kirkii, was sent to Kew by Sir John Kirk.

Streptocarpus caulescens, another caulescent species, followed in 1886.

In 1887, Streptocarpus parviflora (probably Streptocarpus parviflorus, and referred to hereafter as such) was raised from seed brought in from Grahamstown by Mr Watson of Kew.

A similar plant raised from seed by Mr Lynch of the Cambridge Botanic Gardens, was eventually named Streptocarpus lutea.

The next plant to be introduced, Streptocarpus dunnii, played an important role in the production of “beautiful hybrids” of the day. In 1884, seed was collected in the mountains of the Transvaal gold fields, and sent to Kew by Mr E. G. Dunn of Claremont, Cape Town. It was a unifoliate species with “rose or salmon red colour”. It first flowered at Kew in 1886.

In 1890, Streptocarpus galpini was introduced to Kew by Mr E Galpin, who found it on the “Bearded Man” peak that forms one of the boundaries of Swaziland.

Streptocarpus wendlandii was sent in 1887 from Transvaal to Naples to “Messrs Damman” (i.e. two or more men with the last name ‘Damman’ – possibly nurserymen). It first appeared in England at Kew in seed contained in soil attached to tree ferns from South Africa. It flowered at Kew in 1895.

A hybrid named “Streptocarpus × Dyeri” was raised at Kew by crossing Streptocarpus wendlandii with Streptocarpus dunii.

Streptocarpus faninii (not currently listed, could this perhaps be referring to Streptocarpus fanniniae?), is noteworthy because of its contribution to many of the different types of hybrids.

Hortus Veitchii states that the first hybrid Streptocarpus recorded was “Streptocarpus × Greenii”, which was the progeny of S. saundersii and S. rexii. It was raised by Mr Charles Green, who was at the time the gardener to Sir George Mackay of Pendell Court. This specimen was apparently never widely grown and did not contribute to the “present garden race”.

The initial step towards the “beautiful forms” in cultivation at the time was taken by the Curator of Kew. He raised the hybrid “Streptocarpus × Kewensis” by crossing S. rexii and S. dunii. However, he had previously also raised S. parviflorus × S. rexii. A coloured plate of the progeny was published in 1886.

In 1887, another Kew-raised hybrid flowered. It was a hybrid of S. parviflorus and S. dunnii, and received the name of S. × Watsoni, after Mr Watson who raised the seed.

In 1887, two hybrids (S. × Kewensis and S. × Watsoni) were crossed with each other and their parents in all combinations. A host of progeny resulted with marked differences in colour, size, form and flower, and many were “decidedly attractive”. A selection of these were obtained by Heal, who crossed them with each other and with the red-flowered S. dunii. Many of these are now known as “Veitch’s Original Hybrids”. Breeding continued using these hybrids.

== Societies and the international registry ==
There are several societies and groups dedicated to Streptocarpus enthusiasts. Common activities include imparting knowledge, sharing plant material for propagation, and Streptocarpus shows. These societies are both large and small. Some of the groups are housed within larger Gesneriad groups.

Examples of Streptocarpus societies or groups:

- British Streptocarpus Society
- The Gesneriad Society (including societies and the international registry for Streptocarpus hybrids)
- Gesneriphiles - an active email forum
- AVI Streps - a forum for Streptocarpus enthusiasts
- Steptocarpus Info - including forums

=== Showing and displays ===
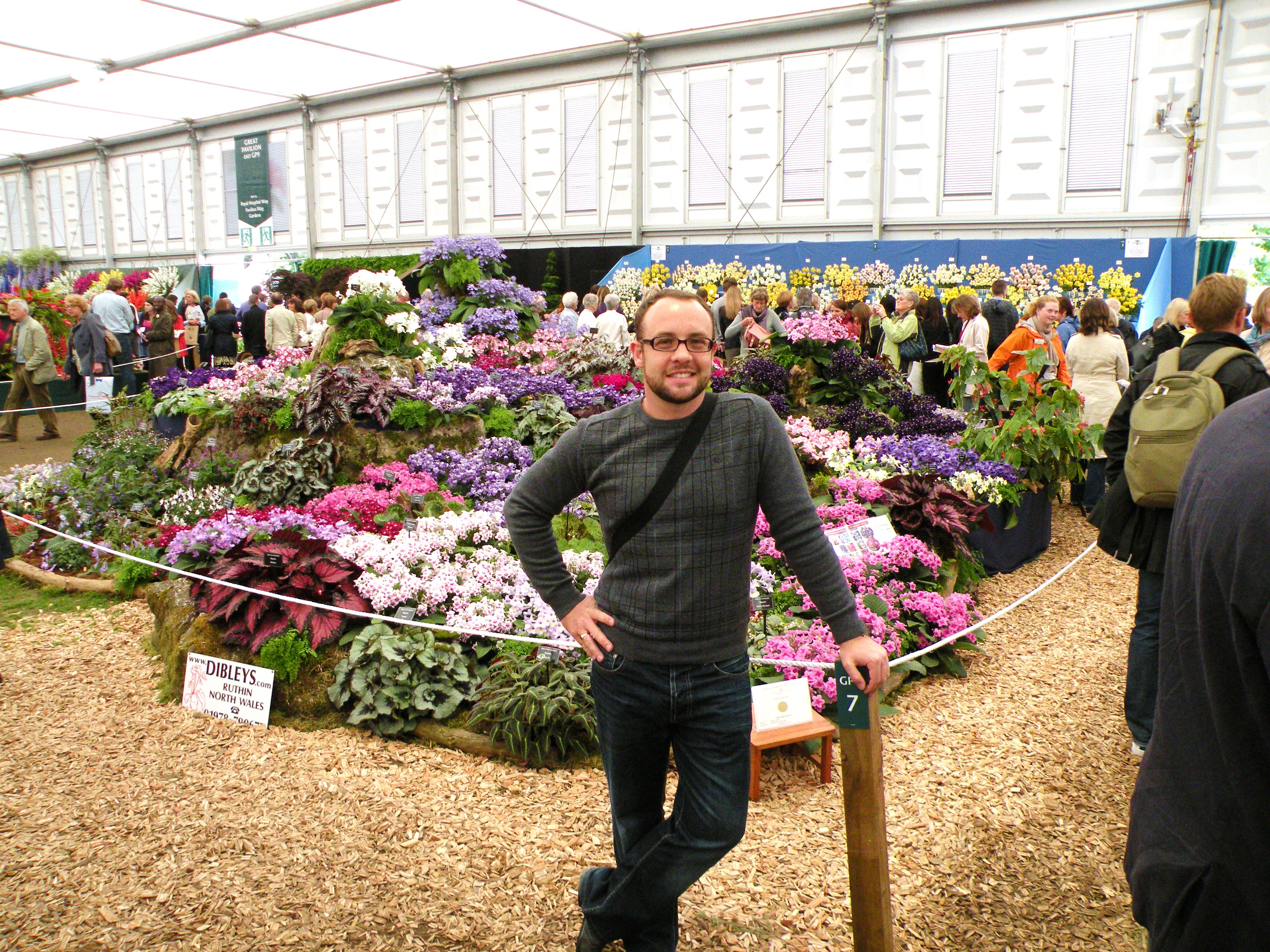
Dibleys gold medal-winning Streptocarpus display, Chelsea Flower Show, May 2011

Shows

In addition to the casual growing, private enthusiasm, or hybridizing, Streptocarpus are frequently used as show plants.

Flower shows are competitions where prizes are awarded for presenting outstanding, usually individual specimens.

Streptocarpus are shown in locations all around the world, either in Streptocarpus-exclusive shows, or as part of wider garden or Gesneriaceae shows.

Generally, to do well at shows, a specimen needs to have many perfect flowers, none faded or damaged; and many healthy, unblemished leaves. Streptocarpus flowers come from leaves, so more leaves means more flowers.

Prizes may also be awarded for "uniqueness" of a specimen.

Displays

Displays are when a large group of plants are shown together, and prizes are awarded for the overall 'look' of the display.

Dibleys Nurseries, of Wales, have won over 100 Royal Horticultural Society gold medals for their Streptocarpus displays, including 25 Chelsea Flower Show gold medals.

== Images ==
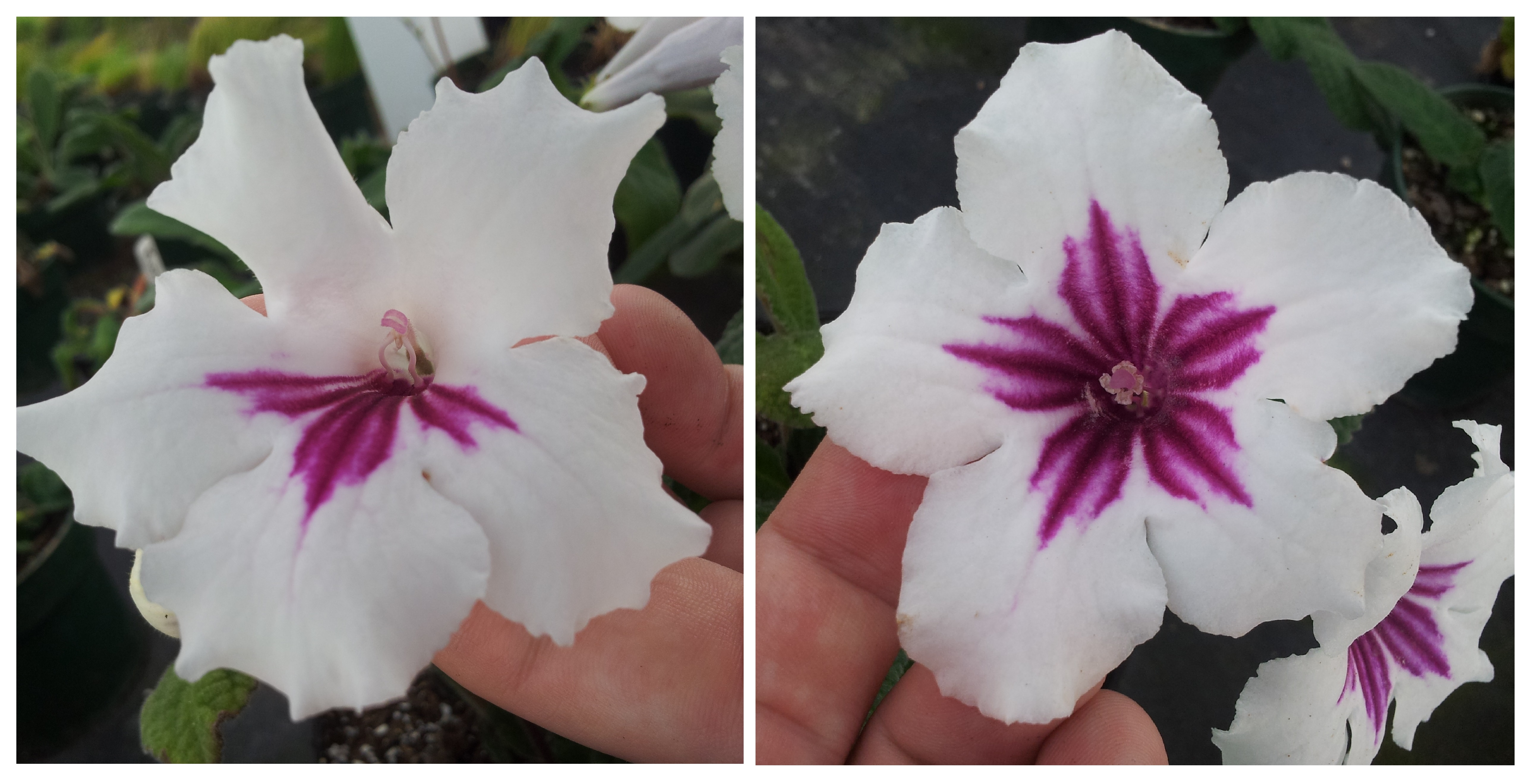
[Left] Normal Streptocarpus flower (zygomorphic), and [right] peloric Streptocarpus flower on the same plant.

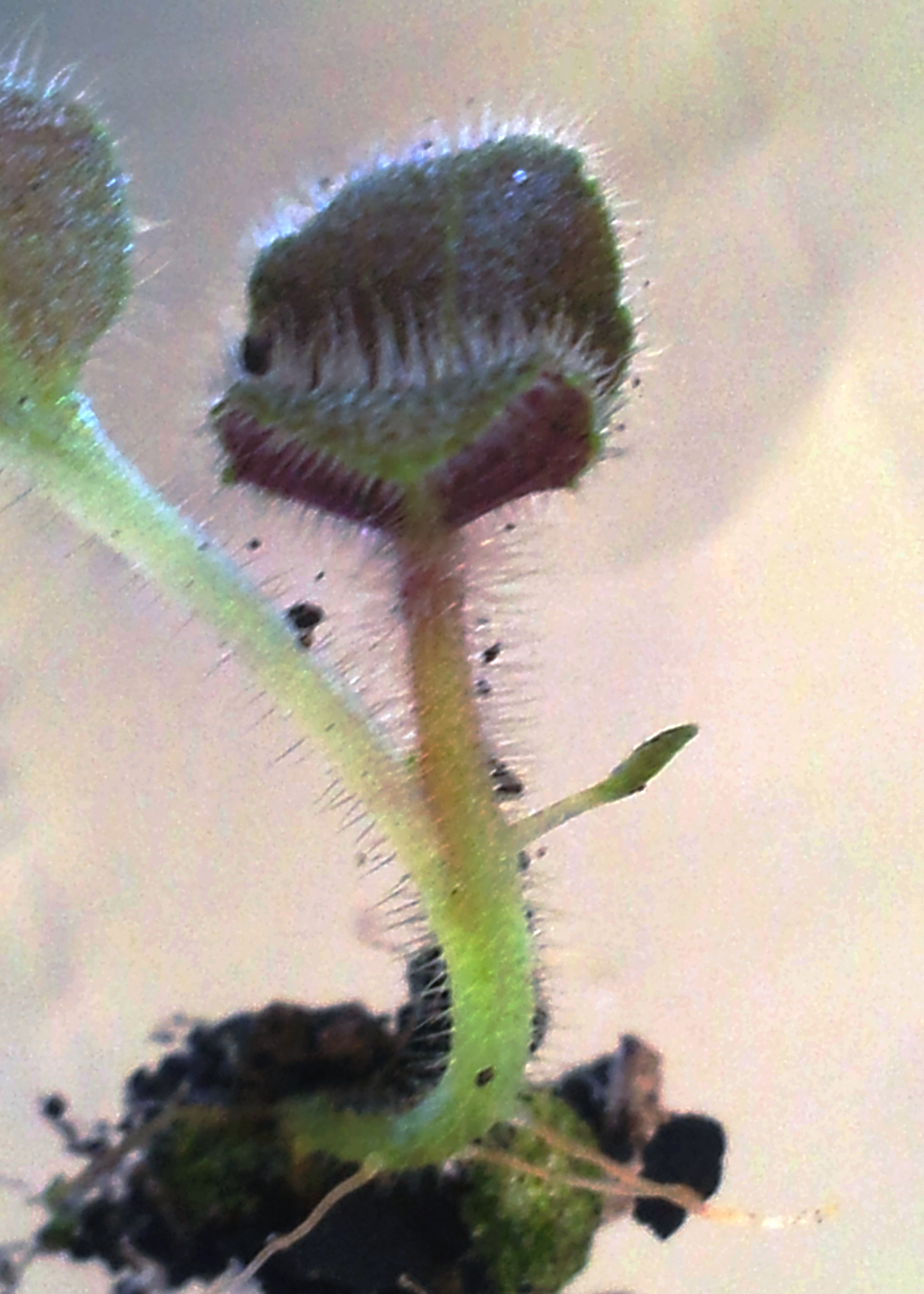
Asymmetric cotyledon development in Streptocarpus subgenus Streptocarpella

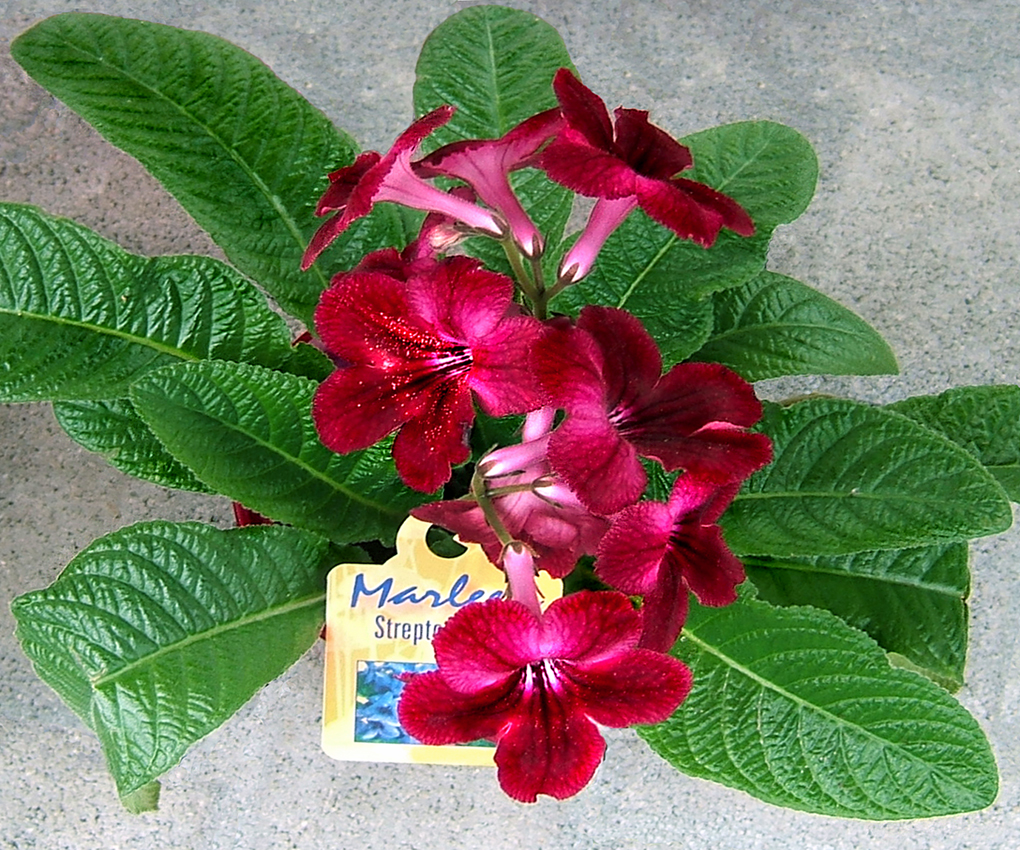
Streptocarpus 'Marlene' from above

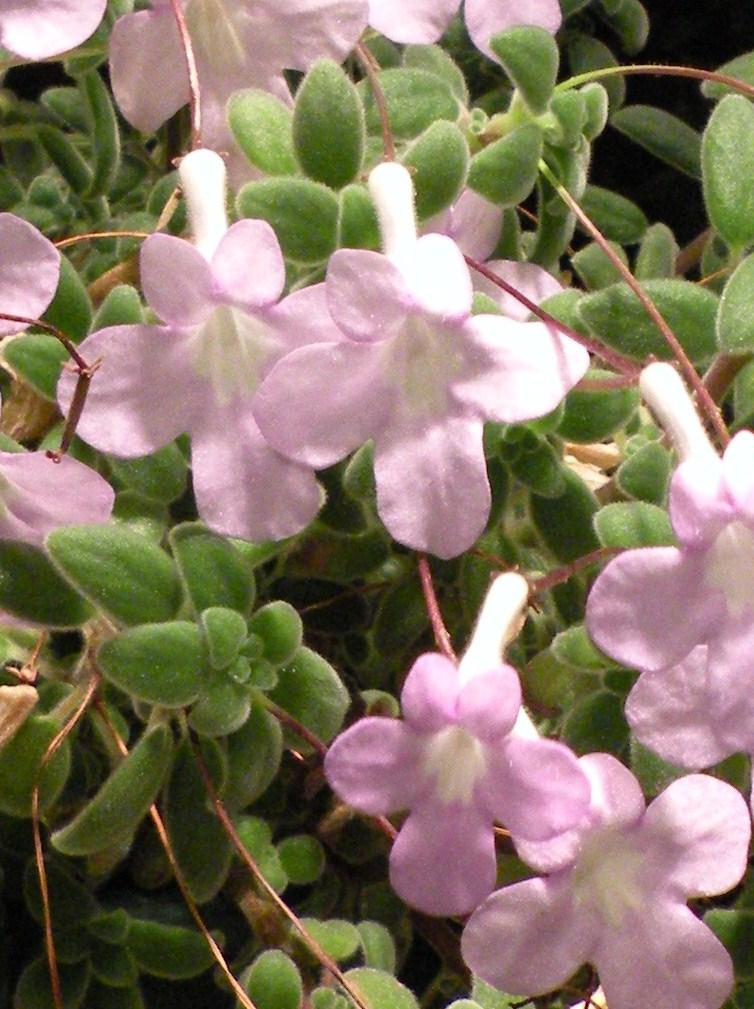
Pink Streptocarpella flowers

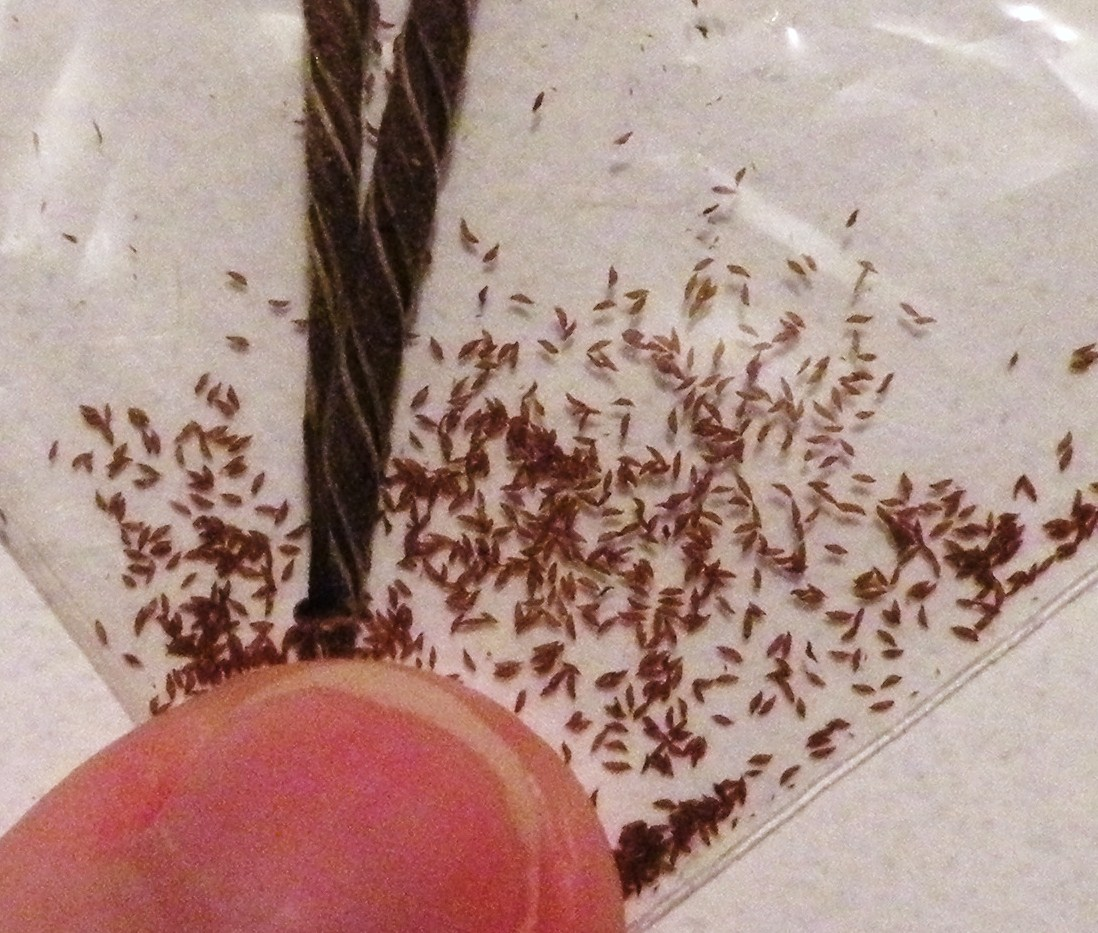
Streptocarpus seed

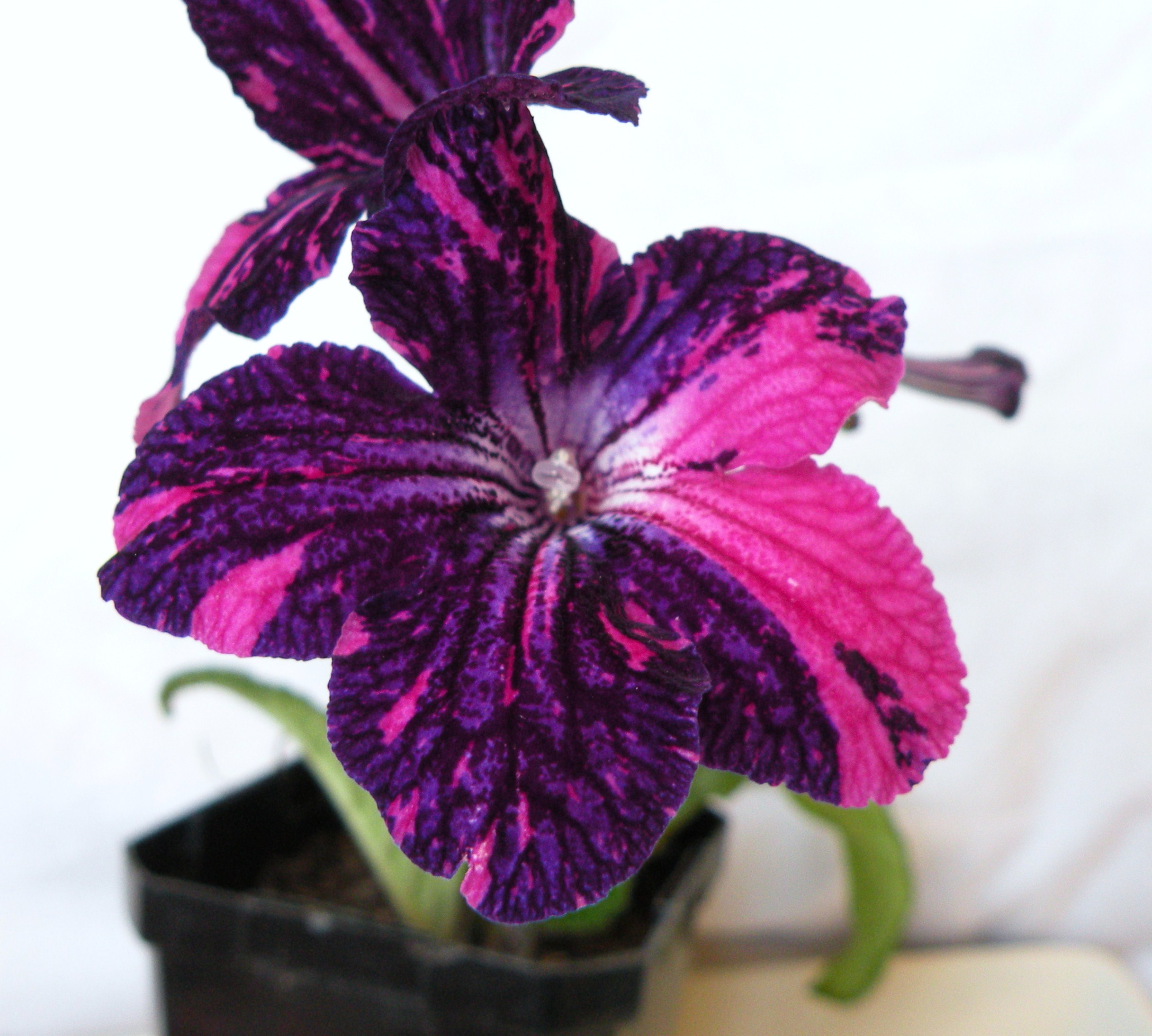
A flower showing 'fantasy' patterning, Streptocarpus 'DS-Little Plushy Arctic Fox'

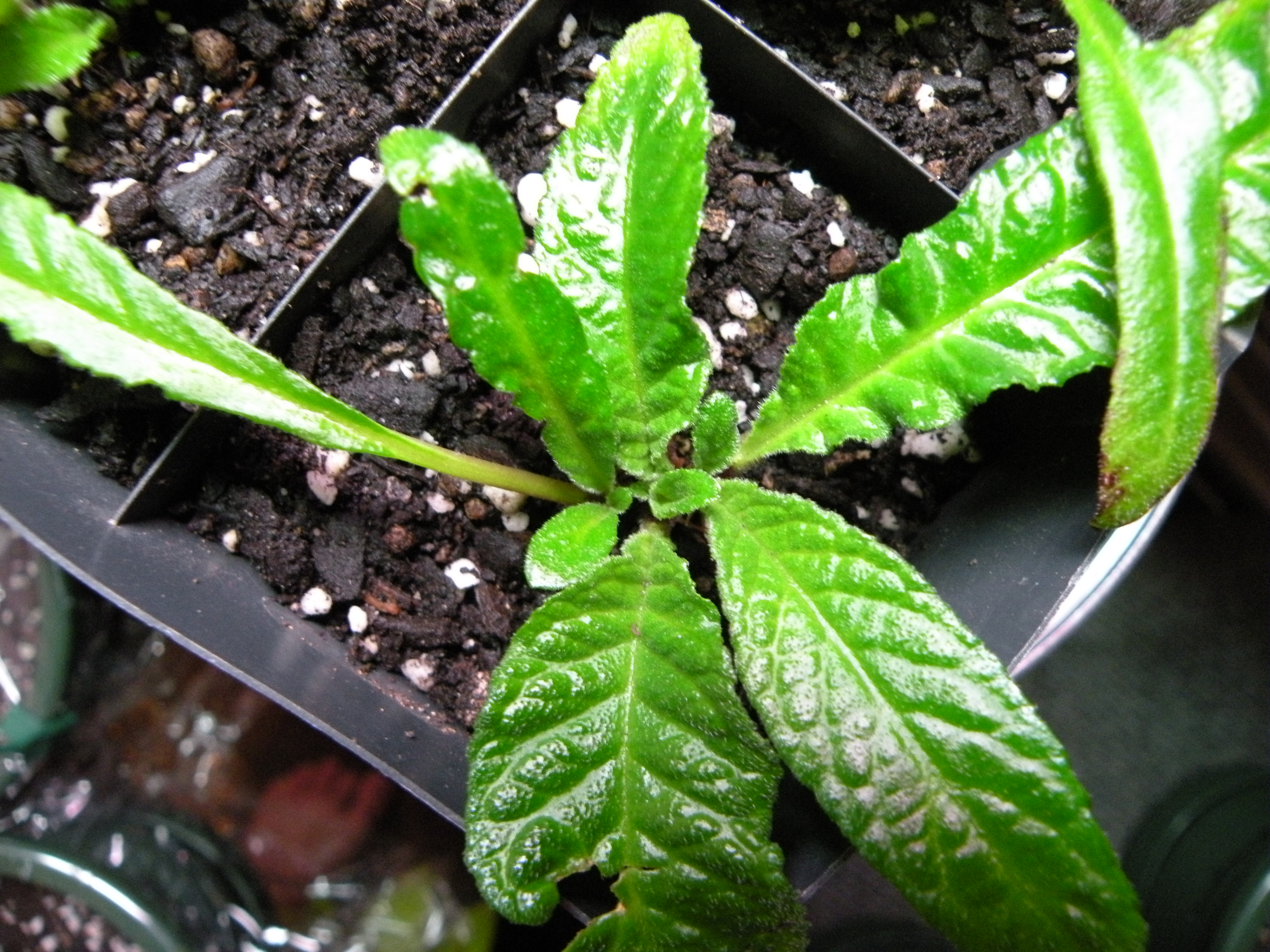
Streptocarpus seedling with Streptocarpus liliputana in recent ancestry

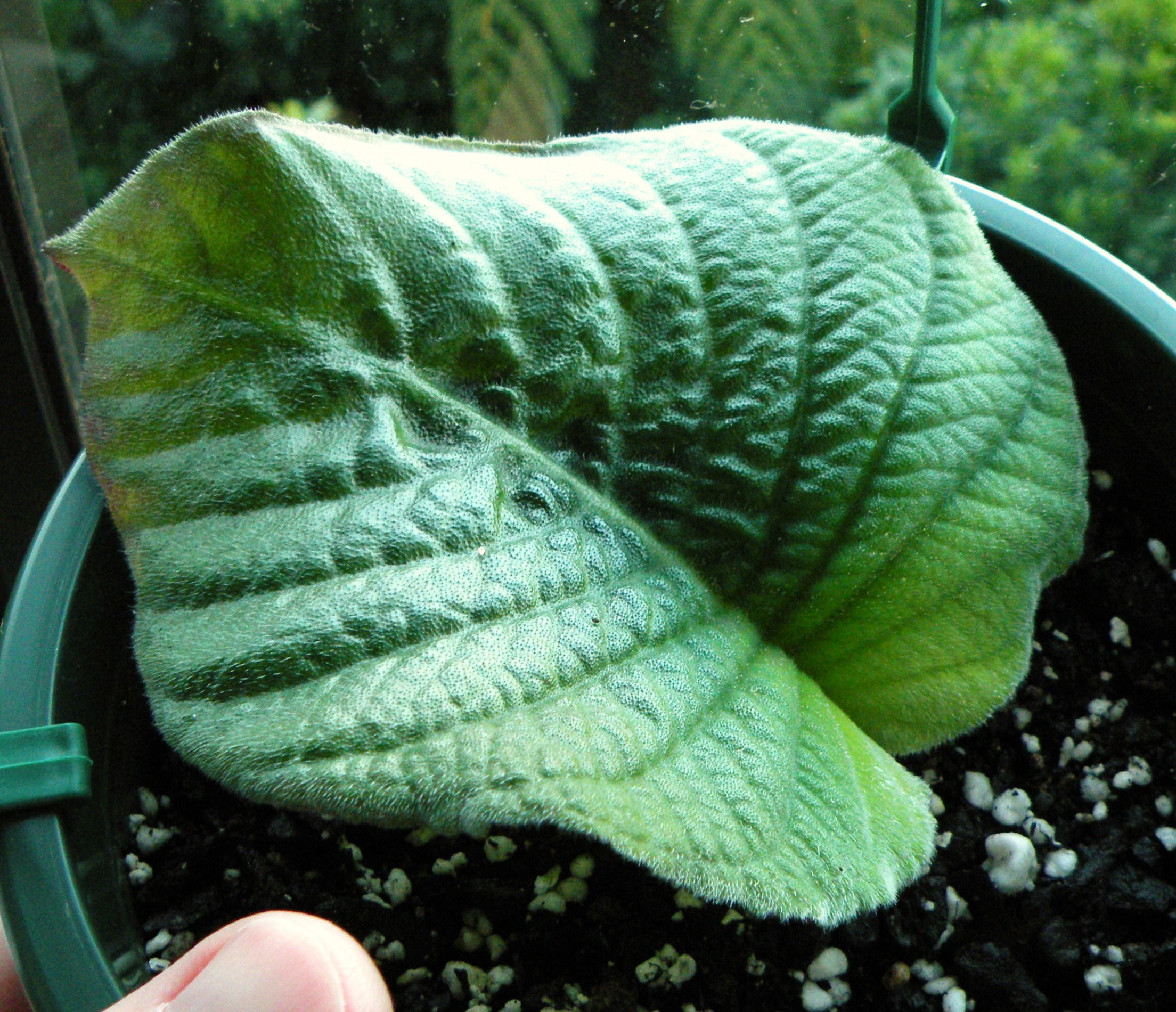
Streptocarpus confusus ssp confusus, young plant

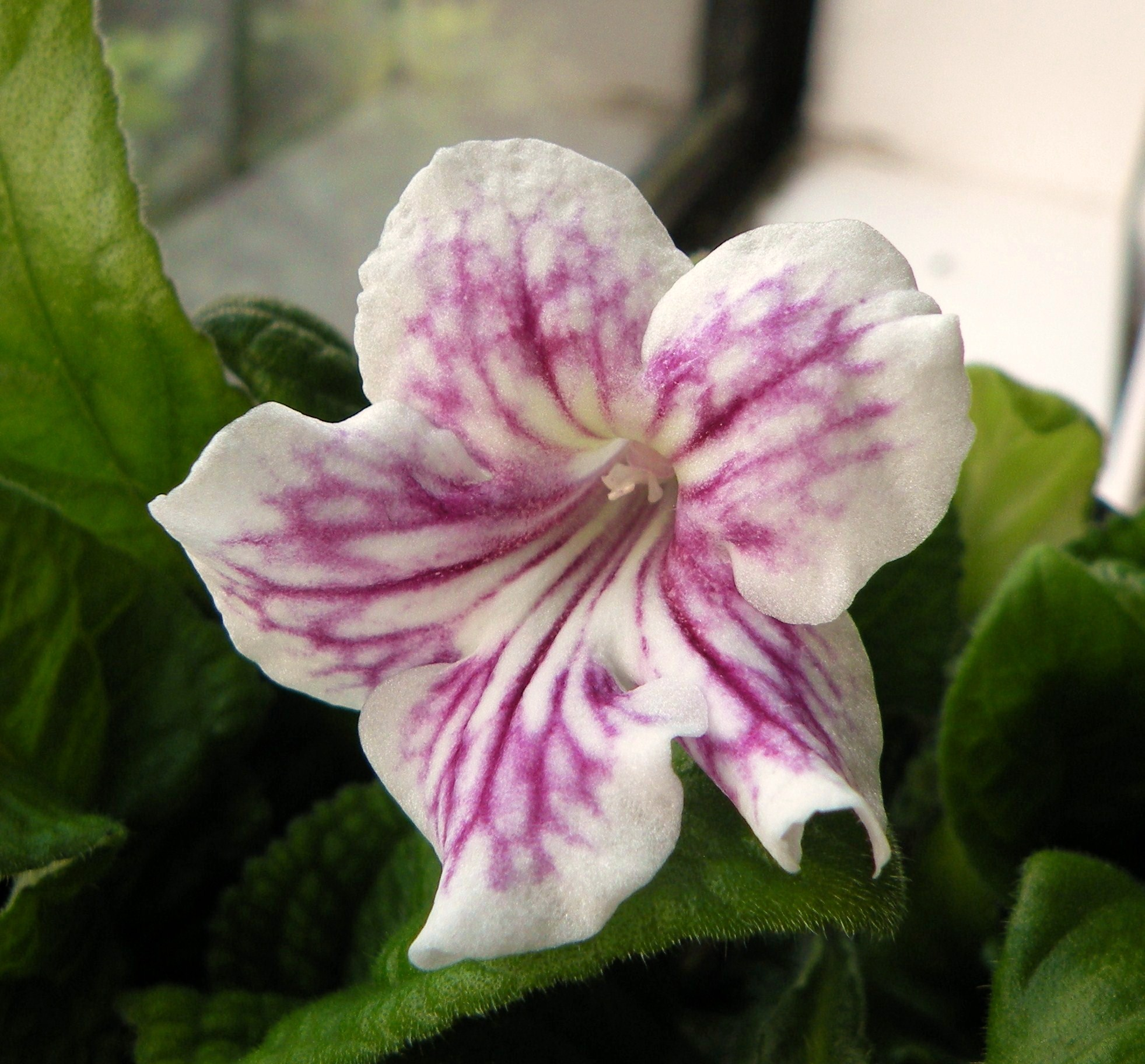
Streptocarpus 'Anderson's Purple Delta'

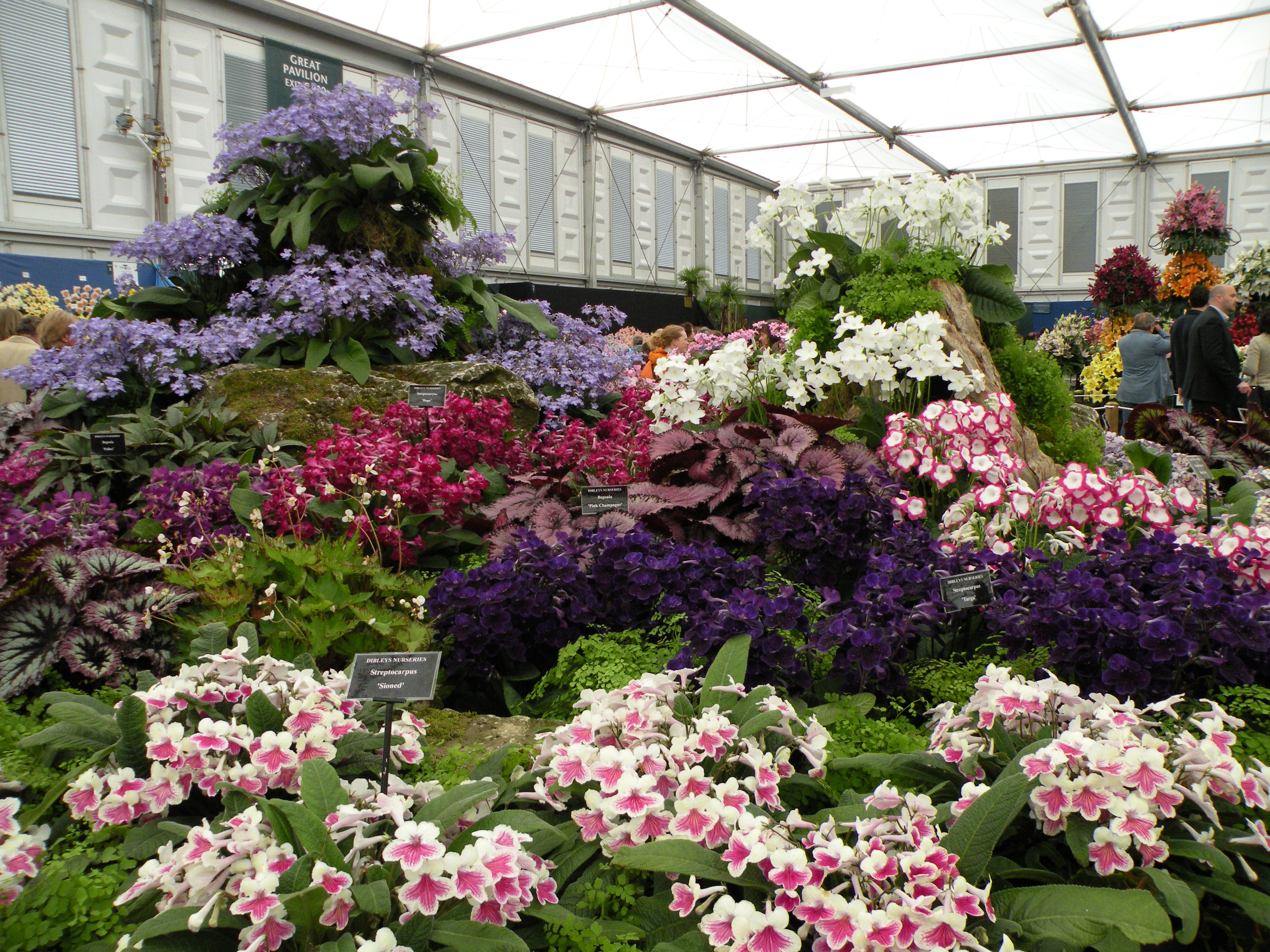
Part of the Dibleys Streptocarpus display at the Chelsea Flower Show in May 2011

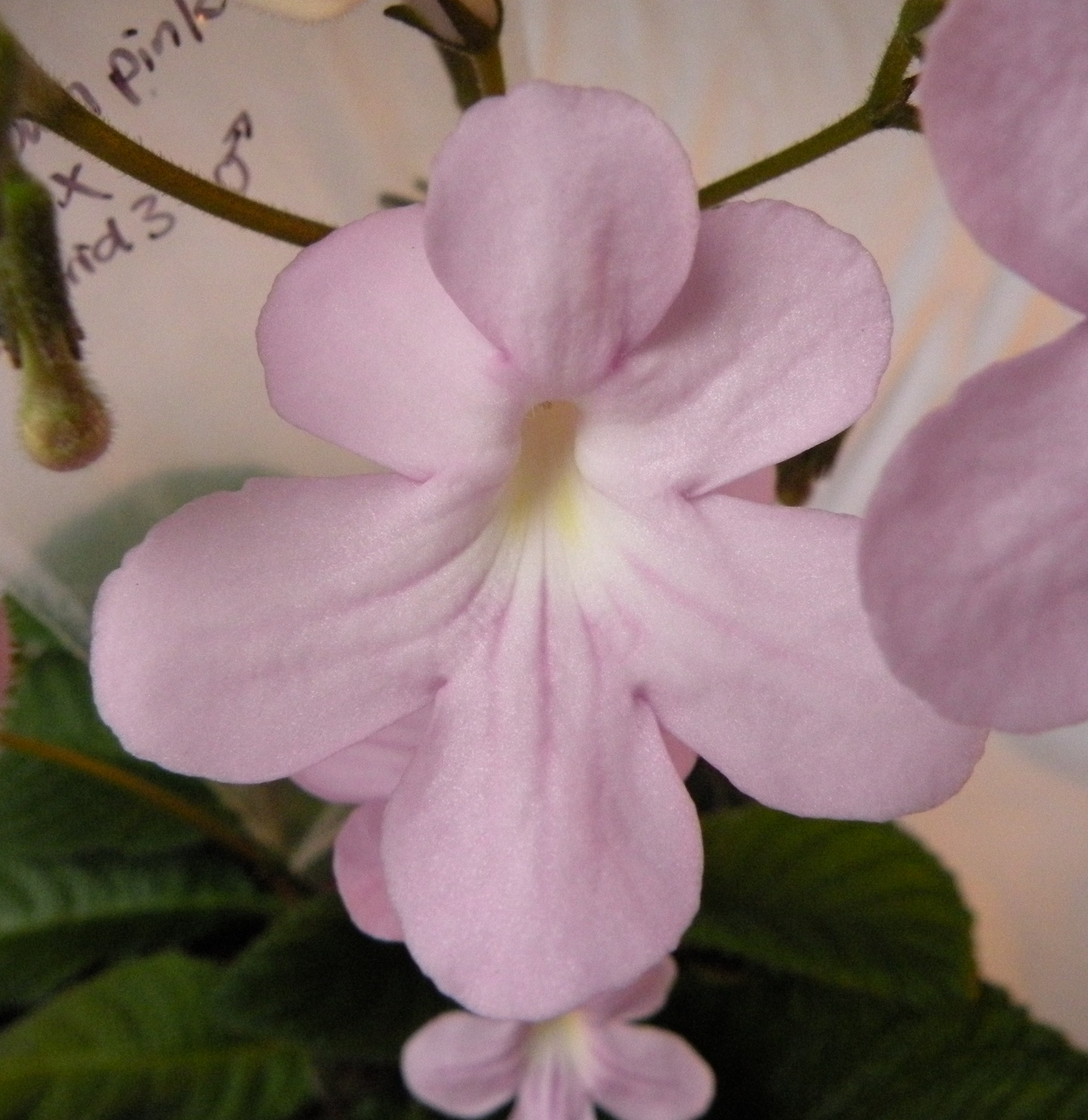
Extra petal anomaly in Streptocarpus 'Gloria'

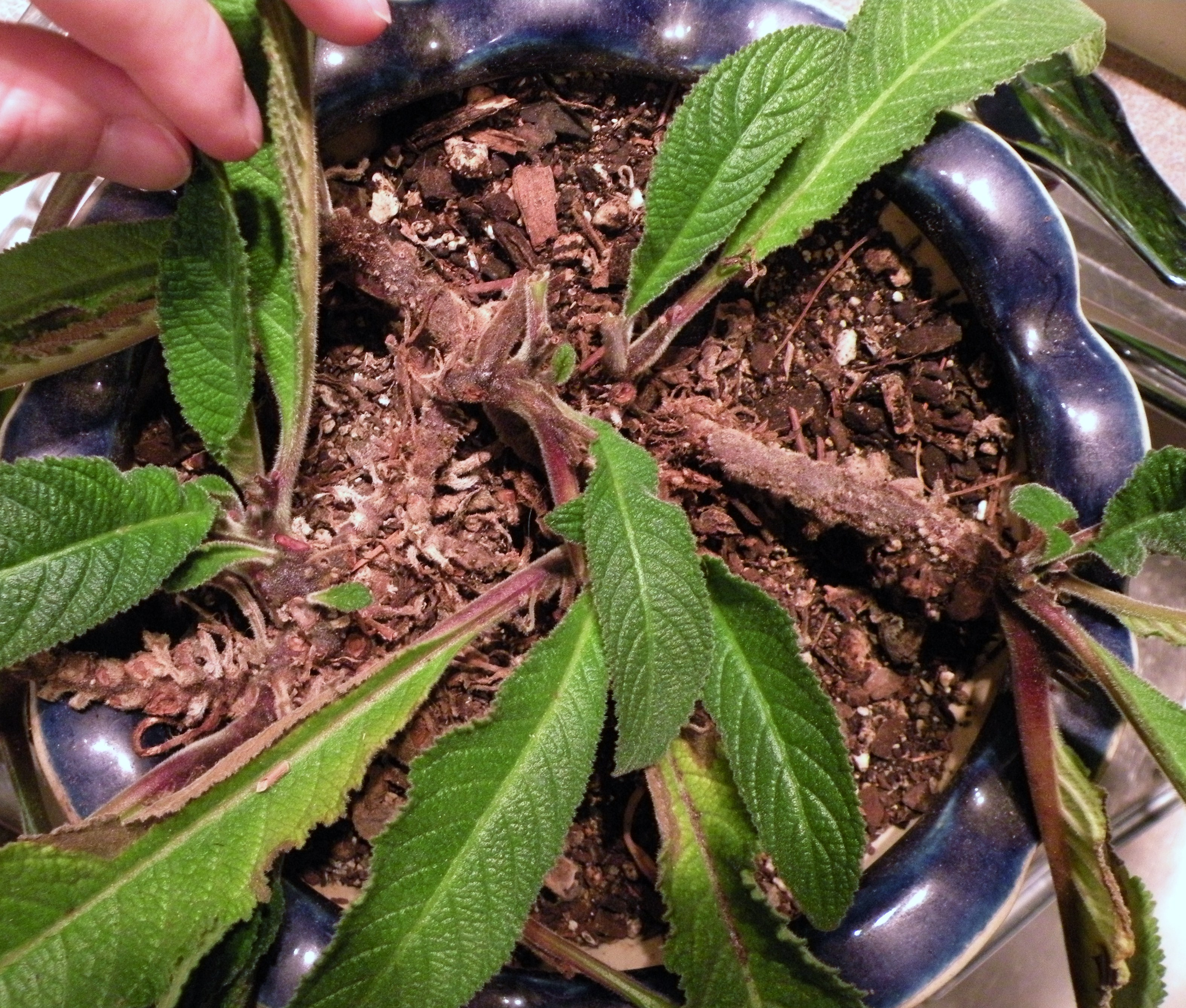
10-year-old (approx) Streptocarpus 'Kim' after pre-winter prune showing creeping stems

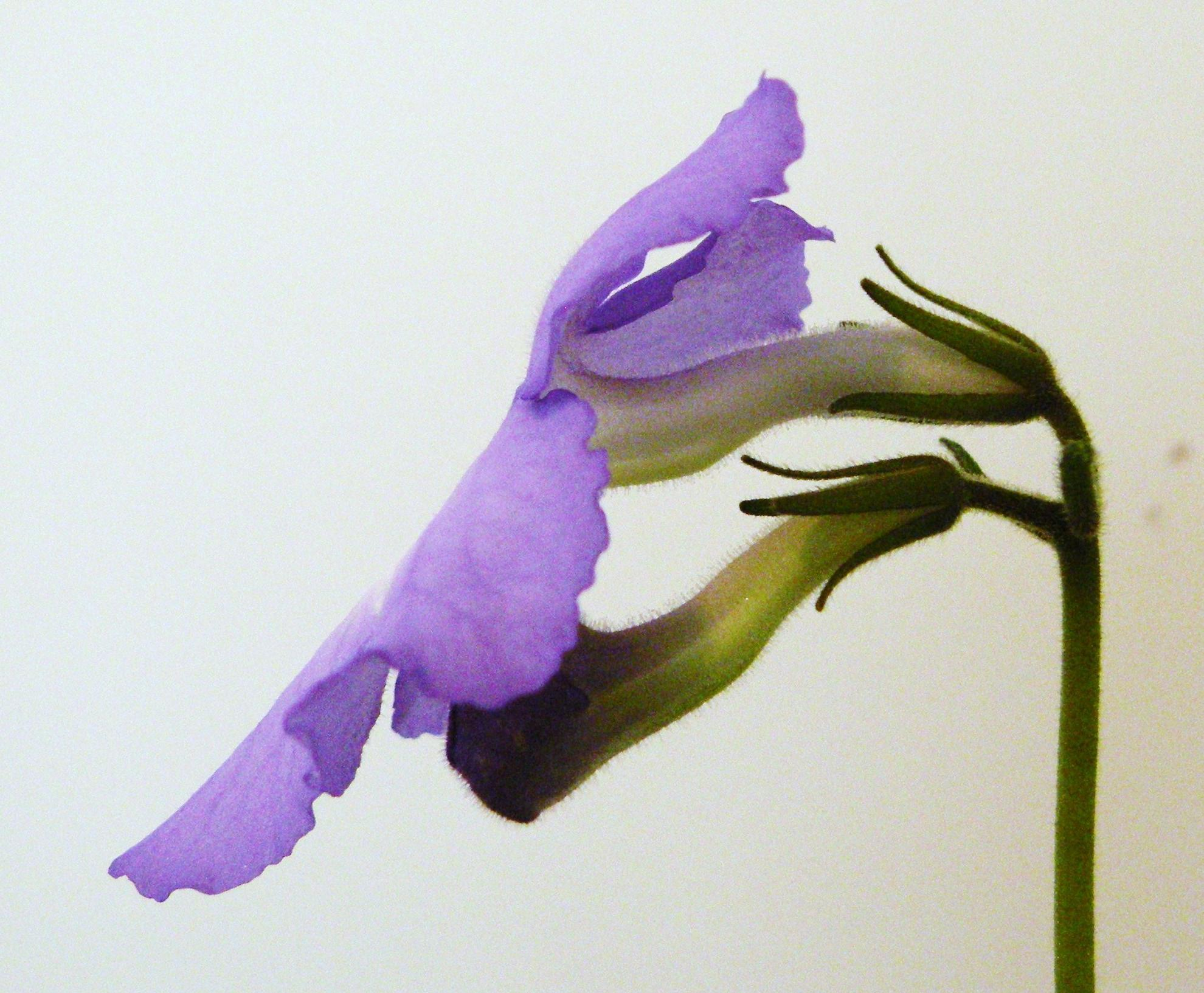
Side-on view of a Streptocarpus flower

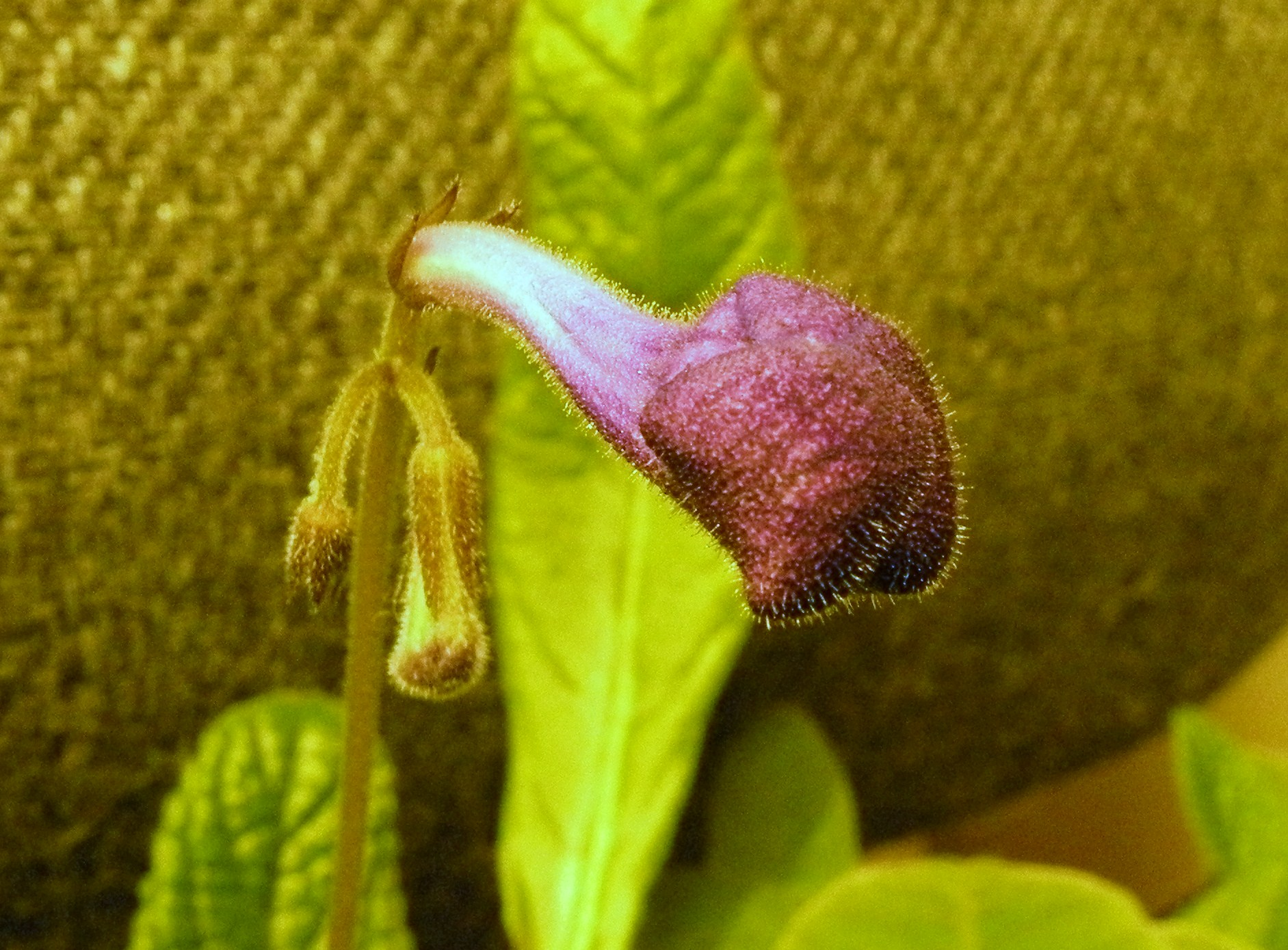
An unopened Streptocarpus bud showing hairs, Streptocarpus 'Anderson's Nightway'

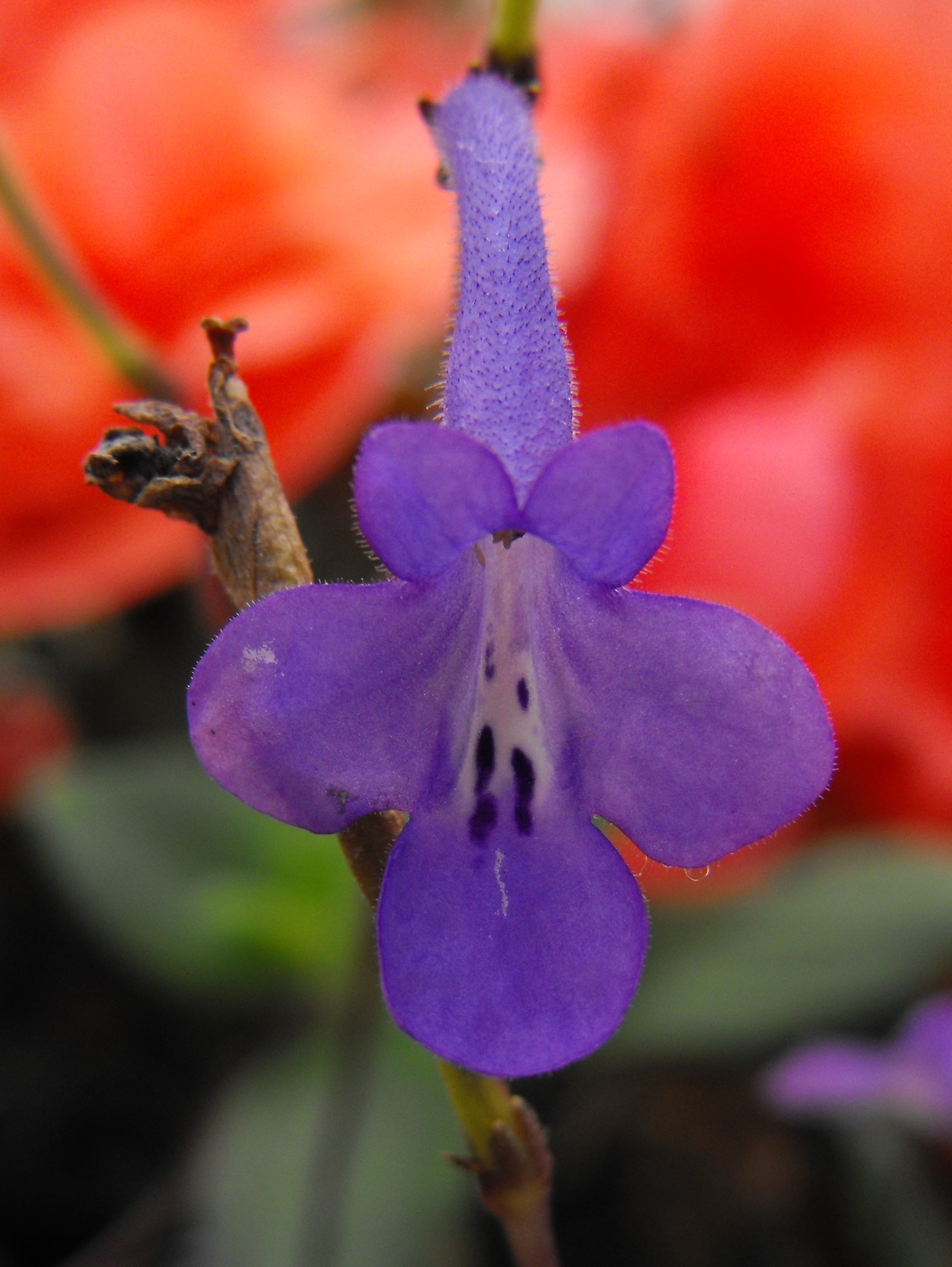
Streptocarpella 'Concord Blue'

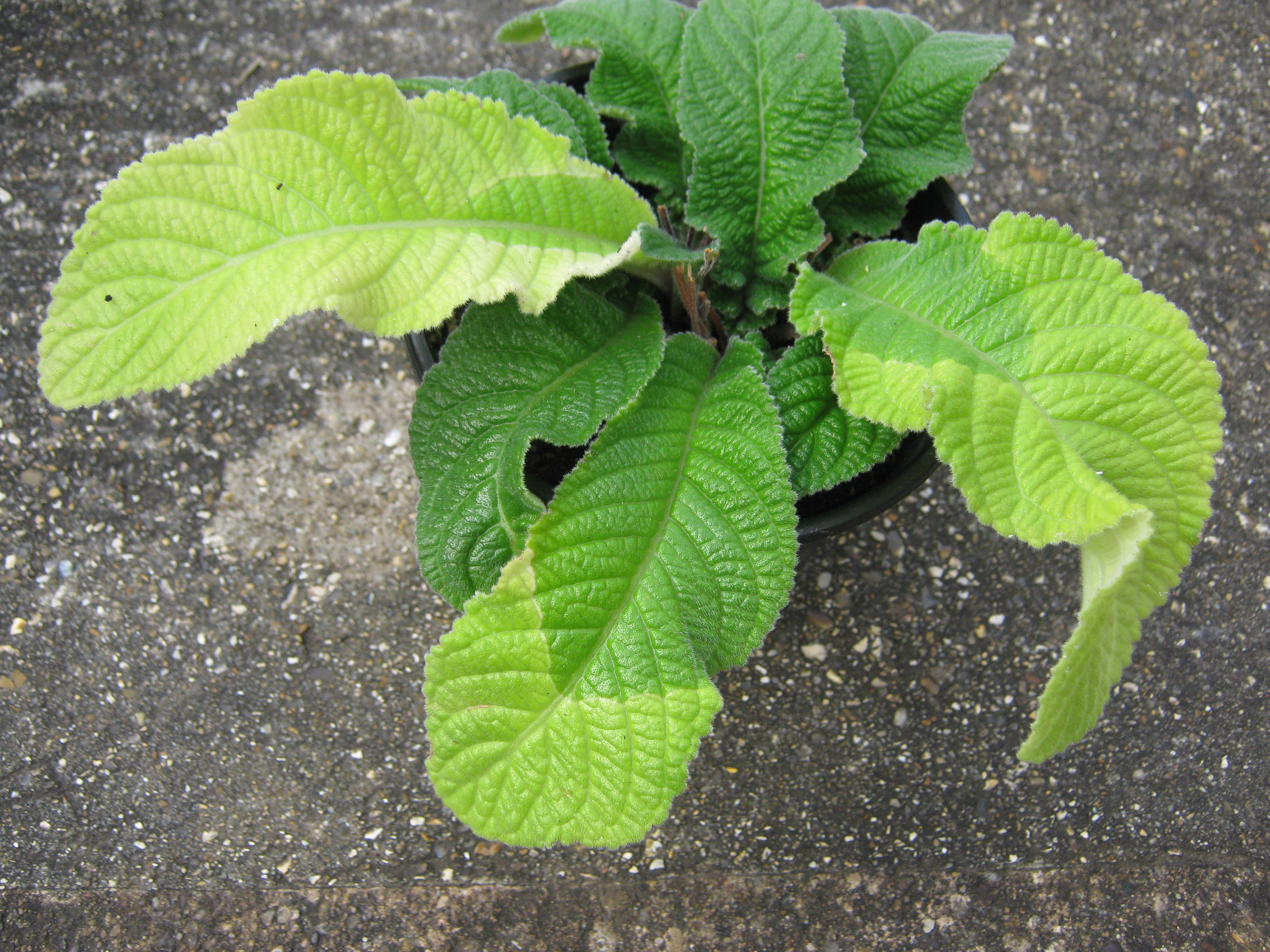
A mature rosulate variety of Streptocarpus showing new winter abscission lines

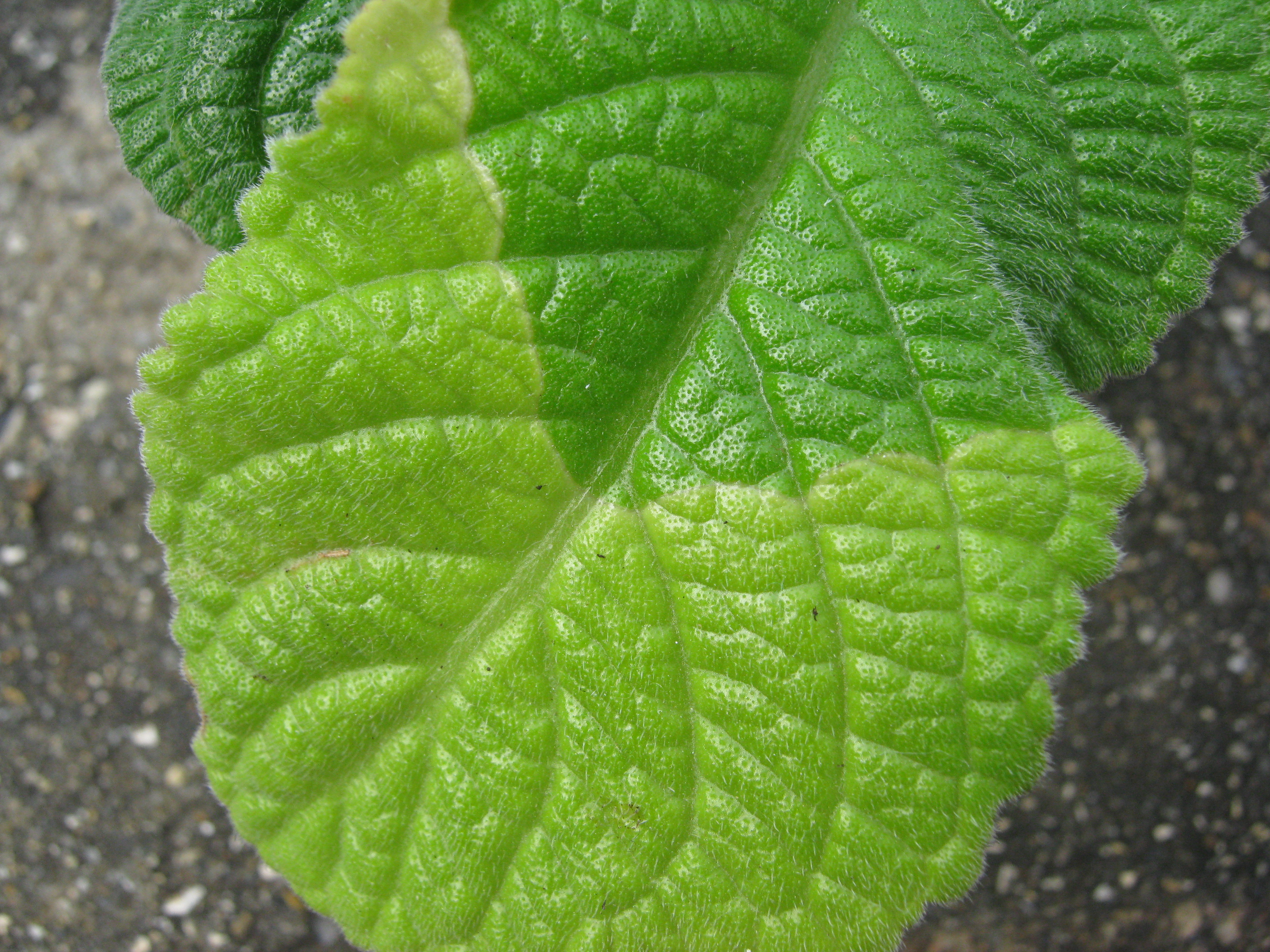
Close-up of a Streptocarpus leaf showing winter abscission line

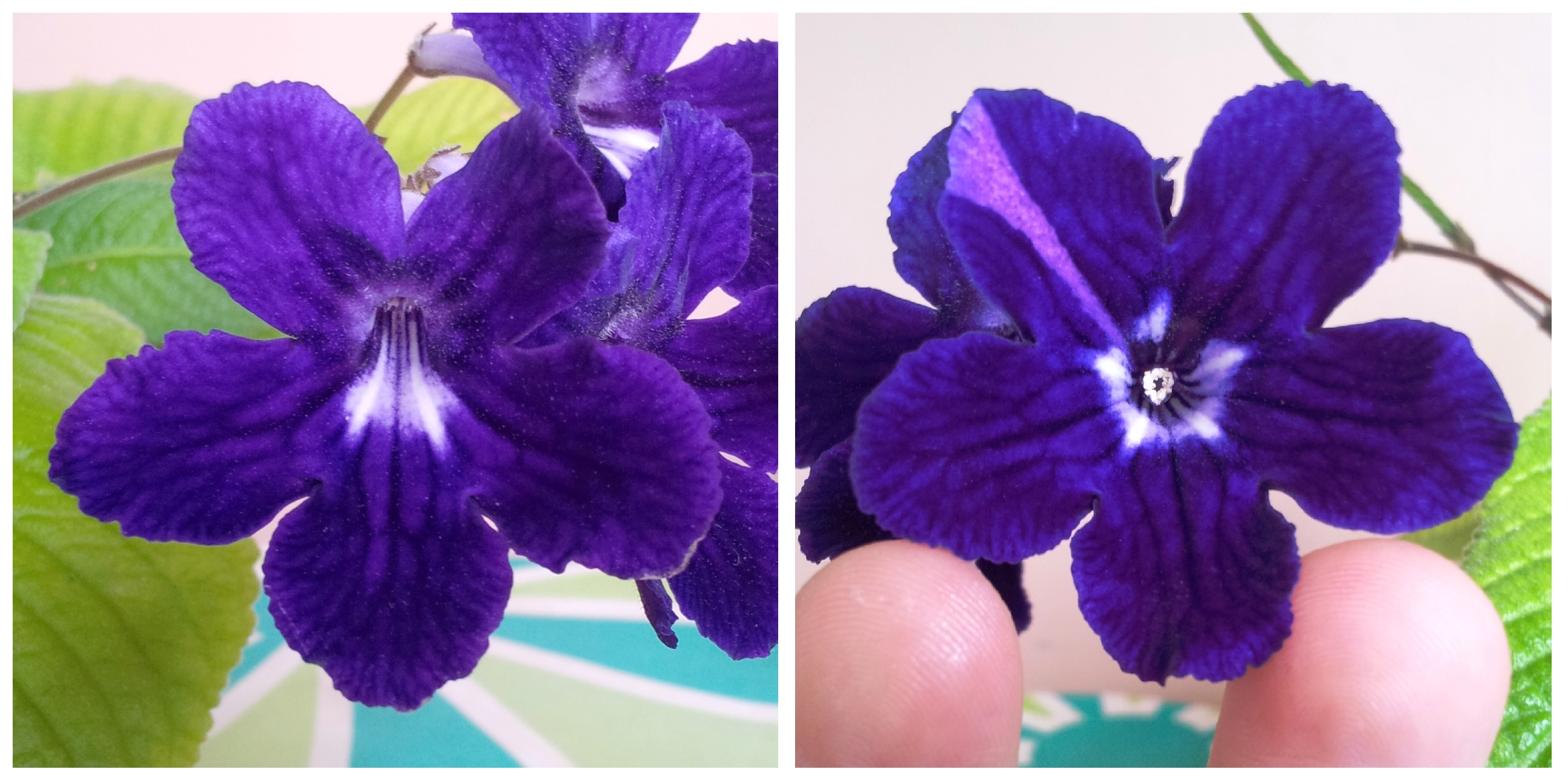
Left: A normal zygomorphic Streptocarpus flower. Right: An aberrant peloric Streptocarpus flower. Both of these flowers appeared on the Streptocarpus hybrid 'Anderson's Crows' Wings'.

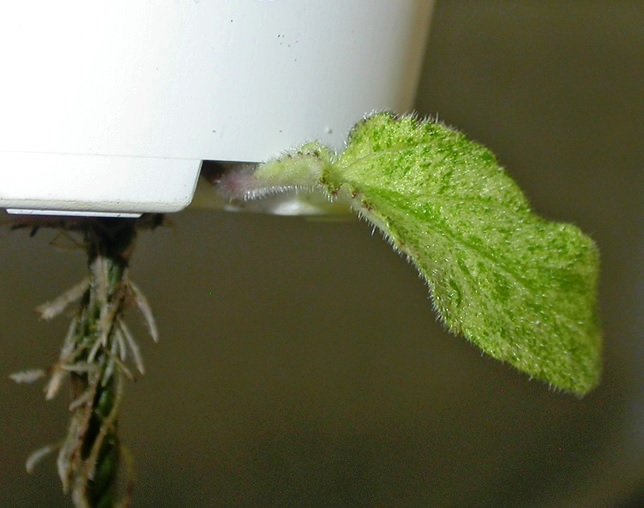
Root plantlet of Streptocarpus 'Dale's Polar Lava'

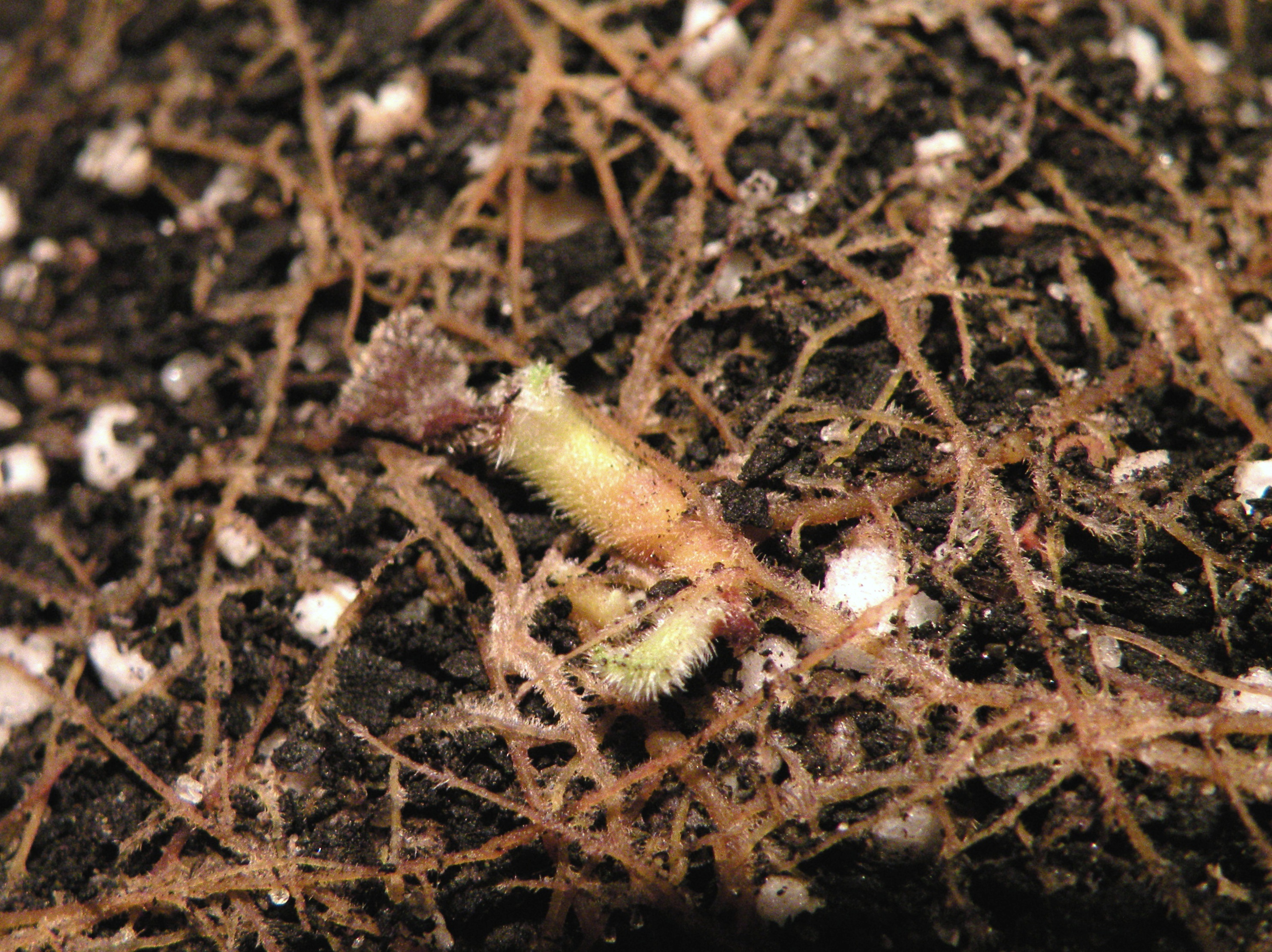
Root plantlet on Streptocarpus 'Gloria'

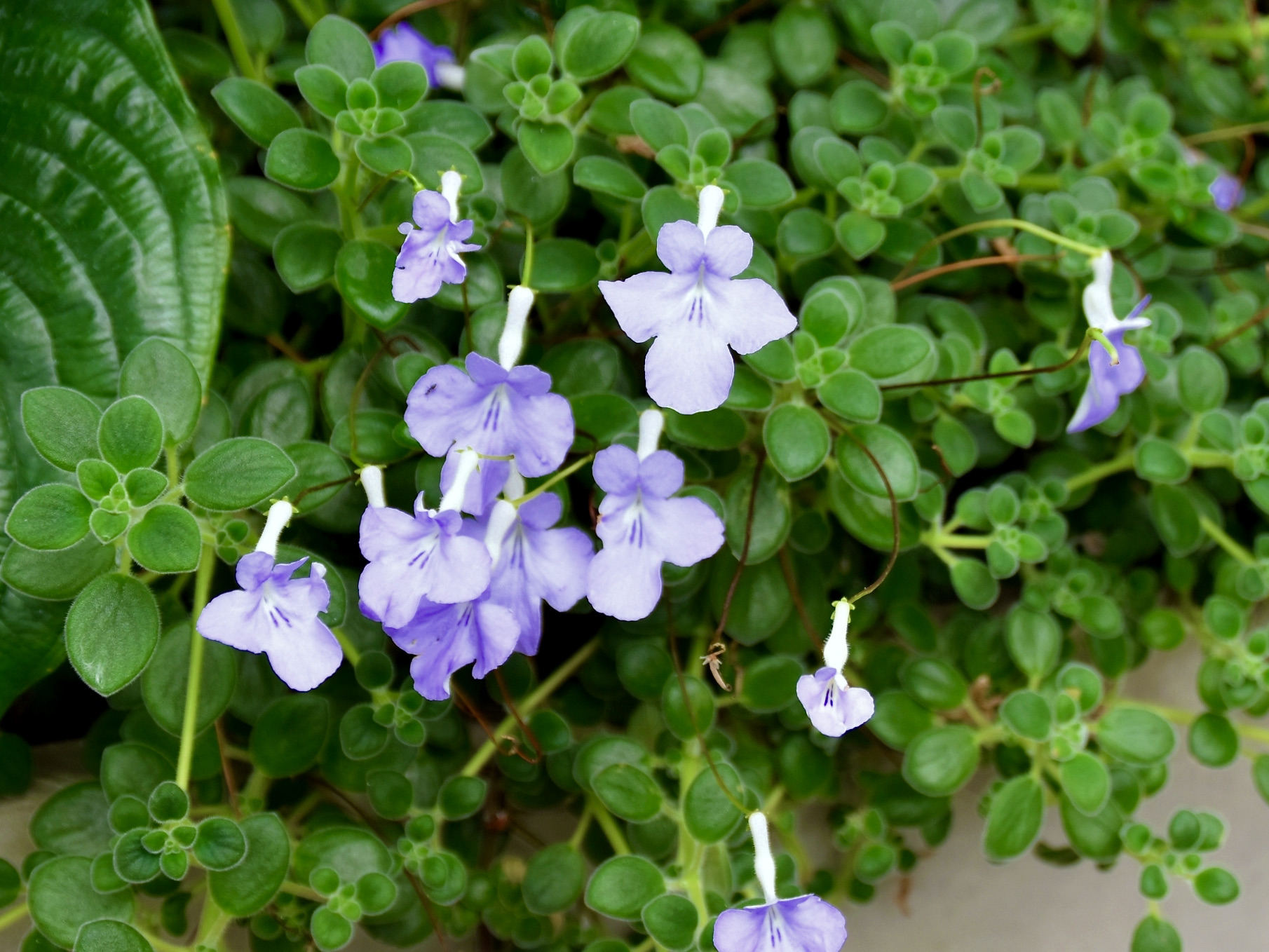
Streptocarpus saxorum in Berggarten Hannover
