= James Bowie (botanist) =

British botanist

James Bowie (c. 1789–1869) was an English botanist.

Bowie was born in London, and entered the service of the Royal Gardens, Kew, in 1810. In 1814 he was appointed botanical collector to the gardens, with Allan Cunningham. They went to Brazil for two years, making collections of plants and seeds.

In 1817 Bowie was sent to the Cape; here he made journeys into the interior, and gathered collections of living and dried plants, while making drawings for the Kew Herbarium; the dried specimens went mostly to the British Museum. A vote of the House of Commons having reduced the sum granted for botanical collectors, Bowie was recalled in 1823, taking up his residence at Kew.

After four years of inactivity he set out again for the Cape, where he was for some years gardener to Baron von Ludwig. He became a correspondent of William Henry Harvey, who dedicated the genus Bowiea to him.

Bowie left his employment in or before 1841, and made journeys into the interior to collect plants for sale. He died in poverty in 1869.
