= Allan Cunningham Monument =

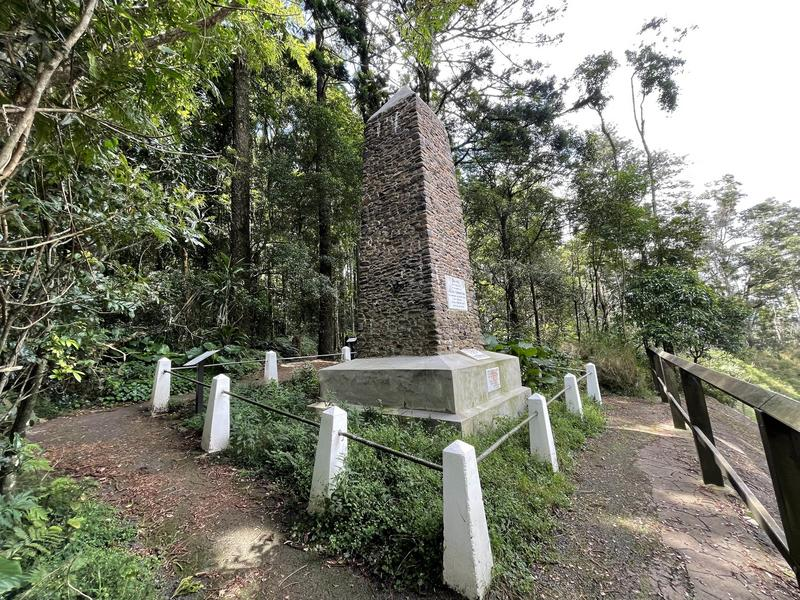
- Allan Cunningham Monument, 2022

- Location within Queensland
- 28.0497°S 152.3946°E
- Location: Cunningham Highway, Cunningham's Gap, Tregony and Tarome, Queensland, Australia

History
- Design period: 1919-1930s Interwar period
- Built: 1927,1935

Site notes
- Architect: Dornbusch & Connolly

Queensland Heritage Register
- Official name: Allan Cunningham Monument
- Type: state heritage
- Designated: 29 April 2022
- Reference no.: 650225
- Type: Monuments and Memorials: Memorial/Monument - person
- Theme: Creating social and cultural institutions: Commemorating significant events

Allan Cunningham Monument is a heritage-listed monument on the Cunningham Highway, Cunningham's Gap, near the boundary of Tregony in the Southern Downs Region and Tarome in Scenic Rim Region, Queensland, Australia. It was designed by Dornbusch & Connolly and built in 1927. It was added to the Queensland Heritage Register on 29 April 2022.

== History ==
The Allan Cunningham Monument, located 40 kilometres (25 mi) north-east of Warwick, was constructed in 1927 to commemorate the centenary of the explorer Allan Cunningham's achievements in traversing the Great Dividing Range and documenting a pass through the mountains in 1828. Cunningham's Gap, as it became known, had long been important to the traditional owners, the Yuggera Ugarapul people, of the Fassifern Valley, and would become the main connecting link between the Darling Downs in the west to south-east Queensland and its coast in the east. The monument's construction coincided with the opening of a road through the pass, and it quickly became a tourist attraction, standing amidst the rainforest of the Main Range National Park.

The valley between Mount Mitchell and Mount Cordeaux, today known as Cunningham's Gap, had long provided a pathway for Indigenous people from the Darling Downs in the west and the Fassifern Valley in the east below. A Dreamtime story tells of the Yuggera Ugarapul people of the Fassifern Valley rounding up all the kangaroos and holding them in a fenced enclosure so no other clan could catch them. However, an old woman released the captured animals and, as they bounded west across the range, they tore the gap between the two mountains.

Prior to the arrival of Europeans in Queensland, the elevated and verdant grass plains of the southern Darling Downs, below what was to become known as Cunningham's Gap, were the traditional lands of the Githabal people, who were known for their careful and deliberate use of fire for the management and maintenance of the grasslands of the Darling Downs (often termed fire-stick farming). The traditional method they used ensured the grasses and other plant species would regenerate and supply a reliable food source for the Githabal people as well as for game animals such as kangaroo and wallabies.

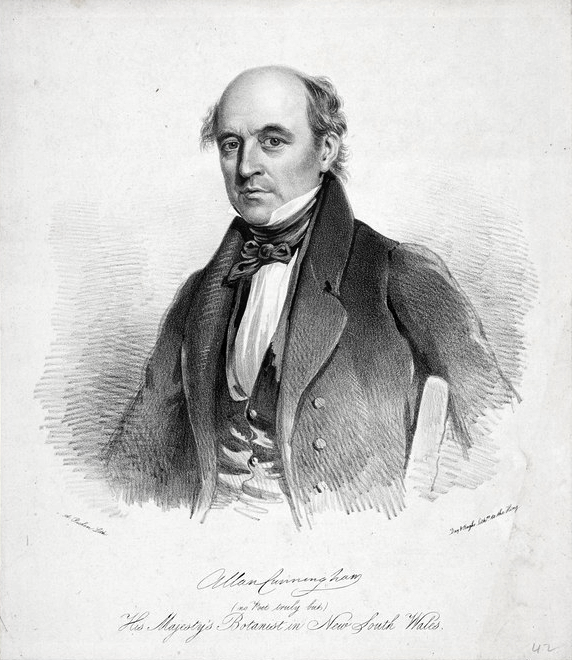
Allan Cunningham

Allan Cunningham (1791–1839) was an experienced, British explorer and botanist in Australia from 1817, joining both terrestrial and nautical expeditions with other explorers, such as John Oxley and Phillip Parker King, before leading his own expeditions through the country north of Bathurst and west of the Blue Mountains. He made important contributions to both Australian exploration and to botany, and was highly respected by his contemporaries. He died in 1839 and five years later an obelisk memorial was dedicated to him in the Royal Botanic Gardens, Sydney, reflecting this esteem. Later, in 1901, his remains were moved from a Sydney cemetery and interred within this obelisk.

In April 1827, after gaining the support of General Ralph Darling, the new governor of New South Wales, Cunningham led a team of six men and eleven horses north. By early June 1827, they had reached the south-eastern edge of what became known as the Darling Downs and were immediately impressed by the lush plains that stretched far to the north, bounded by forested mountains to the east. Cunningham reported to the governor that:

"From these central grounds, rise downs of a rich, black, and dry soil, and very ample surface; as they furnish an abundance of grass, and are conveniently watered, yet perfectly beyond the reach of those floods ... they constitute a valuable and sound sheep pasture".

The British exploration party did not recognise that the grassy plains were the result of the Githabal people's careful management of the Southern Downs country over generations.

On this journey, Cunningham named the Condamine River, one of the major waterways on the Darling Downs. He also identified a possible pass over the dividing range to the coast, which would later be known as Spicer's Gap. The party returned to Sydney in mid-June 1827. Just over one year later, in August 1828, Cunningham headed another expedition, with two bullocks, two servants and a driver, from Ipswich (then known as Limestone) and followed the Bremer River, a tributary of the Brisbane River, south-west. The expedition's main purpose was to locate the pass that they found the previous year, but from the east side of the Great Dividing Range.

After travelling for several days, the expedition arrived at the foot of the mountain range where they camped. Cunningham noted the presence of aboriginal people's camps in the distance:

"the smoke of natives" fires was seen curling above the trees a little to the eastward of us, but these people kept themselves very quiet, not a voice heard, or a person seen"

Cunningham and his men reached what they believed was the gap they identified the previous year from the west (Spicer's Gap), but was, in fact, the pass known today as Cunningham's Gap. On 25 August 1828, Cunningham climbed to the summit of the pass and beheld the Darling Downs below to the west; he later wrote:

"Without the smallest difficulty, and to my utmost surprise, we found ourselves in the highest part of the Pass, having fully ascertained the extent of the difficult part, from the entrance into the wood, to this point not to exceed 400 yards. We now pushed our way westerly through this extraordinary defile, and, in less than half a mile of level surface, clothed with thick bush of plants common to the Brisbane River, reached the opposite side of the main range, where I observed the waters fell westerly to Millar's Valley beneath us."

In an 1832 issue of the Royal Geographical Society's journal article he wrote, "should the Gap, which had been discovered in the main dividing range ... admit of a passage through that chain of mountains, the readiest point of access to the very desirable country on their western side would be from the shores of Moreton Bay and Brisbane River". Having achieved their goal to find the pass, the expedition returned to Limestone.

Twelve years later, grazier Patrick Leslie, with a large party, set out from Penrith, New South Wales to explore the Darling Downs. In 1840, he pioneered the first European pastoral runs on the Downs, "Toolburra" and "Canning Downs", and established the important wool industry in the region. Other graziers (often called squatters) soon followed, with further pastoral runs dividing and changing the traditional grass plains of the Githabal people. Agriculture was also introduced in this era when closer settlement began. Increasingly, the traditional lifestyle of the Githabal people, as well as the other Indigenous groups throughout the Darling Downs, was disrupted and people were soon dispossessed, often violently, from their ancestral land.

The town of Warwick, which grew to become the business centre for the southern Darling Downs, was surveyed by James Burnett in 1849, with the first sale of Crown land occurring in July 1850. Warwick was declared a municipality in 1861 and was subsequently transformed from a squatters' town into the principal urban centre of this prosperous pastoral and agricultural district.

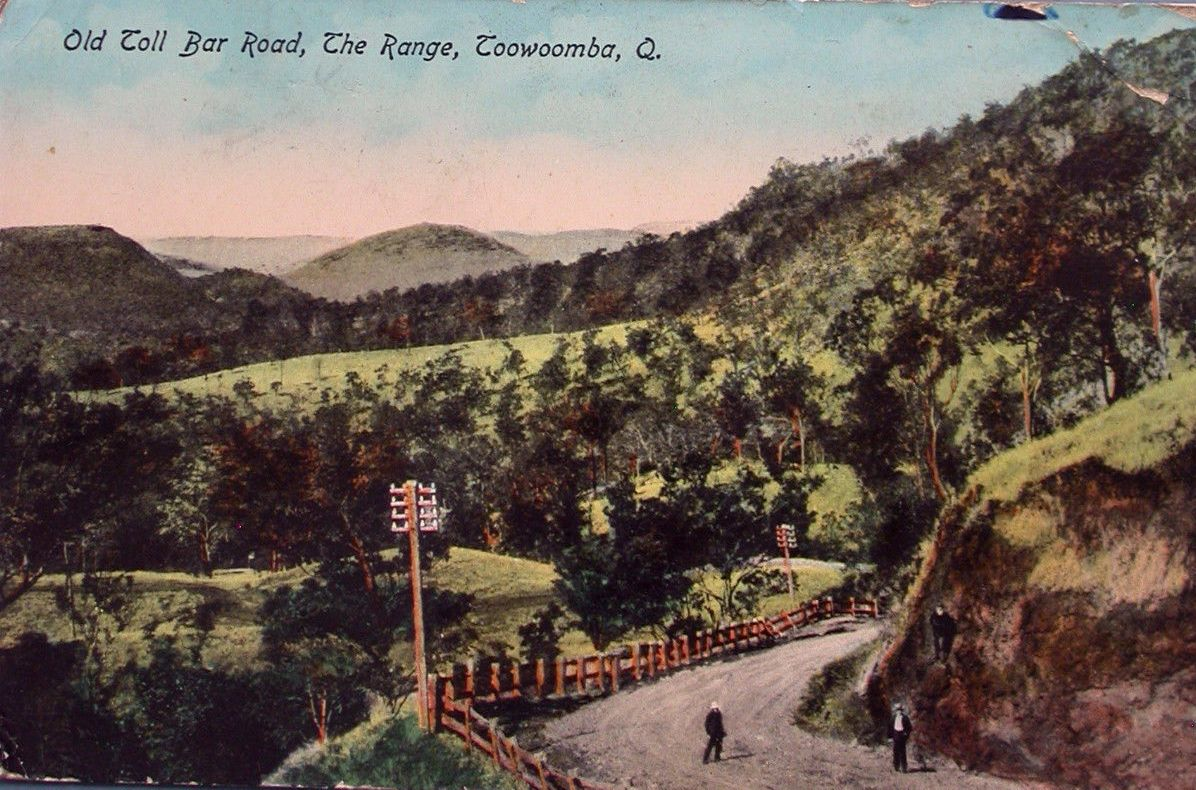
Old Toll Bar Road, Toowoomba, circa 1910

From the 1840s, Darling Downs pastoralists were faced with an expensive 800-kilometre (500 mi) trip to Maitland to carry wool to port and return with supplies to the stations. A direct route to the Moreton Bay settlement (later to be named Brisbane) was needed. In 1840, Leslie and fellow pastoralist, Arthur Hodgson obtained permits from Governor Sir George Gipps to have supplies sent to Brisbane; however, they still had problems with getting their stores from Brisbane over the Great Dividing Range to the Darling Downs. Several passes across the range to the Darling Downs had been cut from the 1840s:

- Gorman's Gap was a short-lived crossing north of Toowoomba in the 1840s
- a dray route called Spicers Gap Road over Spicer's Gap was cut in the late 1840s
- Toowoomba's Toll Bar Road provided a dray route up the range to Toowoomba from the 1850s

A rough road over Cunningham's Gap, east to the Fassifern Valley below had also been made from the 1840s for drays carrying wool to Ipswich. To cater for travelling dray teams an inn, known as Jubb's Woolpack Inn, was established in the early 1850s a few miles from the western ascent in Maryvale. However, by the mid-1850s, this road was rarely used due to the steepness of the incline on the eastern side of the pass. In 1854, Herbert Marshall wrote an account of his visit to the Darling Downs, over which they travelled through the Spicer's Gap road:

"The old road used to go over a place called Cunningham's gap which was so bad that they had to lower the drays down with a rope, but now they have cut a new road south."

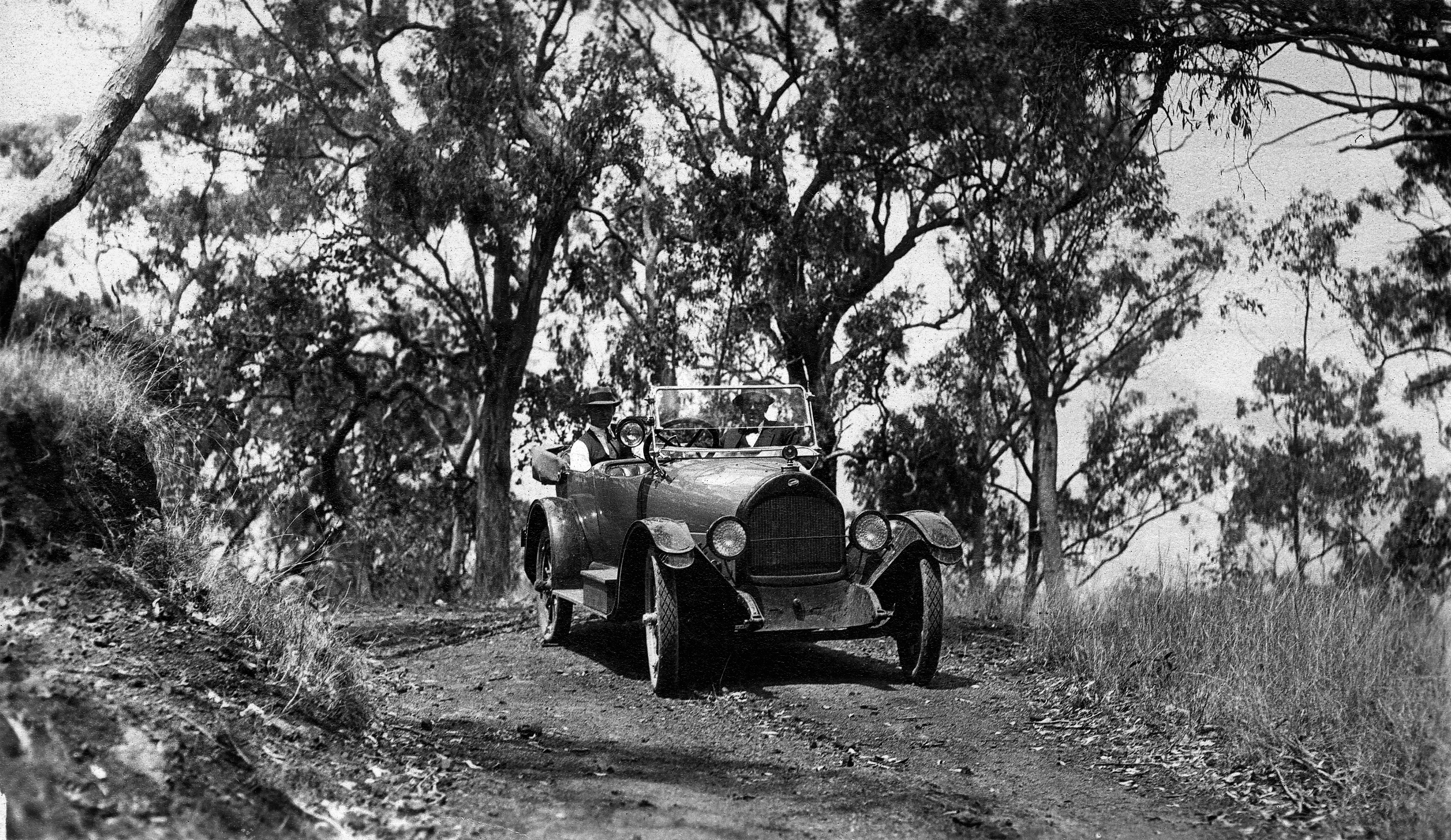
On the road at Spicers Gap, 1923

Consequently, Spicer's Gap became the preferred dray route over the range from Warwick until the early twentieth century, although it, too, proved to be a difficult one.

The lush sub-tropical rainforest on the elevated slopes of Mount Mitchell and Mount Cordeaux, and through Cunningham's Gap, had been appreciated by nature enthusiasts as early as the 1840s. Increasingly, timber-getters logged the slopes for valuable timbers such as red cedar (Toona ciliata). Inspired by the national parks movement, by the turn of the 19th century many in the district began lobbying the government to protect these forests. A national park movement was initiated in Queensland after 1879 by pastoralist, businessman and politician Robert Martin Collins following his visit to the United States of America, where the movement had commenced in 1870. This movement called for governments to reserve land in its natural state for the benefit of all people. Collins was instrumental in establishing Queensland's first national park at Witches Falls, Mount Tamborine in 1908. In July 1909 it was announced tha t3,100 acres (1,300 ha) at Cunningham's Gap was to become a national park, and it was noted that "the area is on the western side of the range ... many excellent specimens of staghorns and native vegetation exist within the area". The new national park, initially called Cunningham's Gap National Park (now the Main Range National Park), included both Mount Mitchell and Mount Cordeaux.

There had long been debate regarding a preferred trafficable route to Warwick over the Great Dividing Range. By the early twentieth century, with the increased popularity of the motor car, Spicer's Gap often proved dangerous and impassable. At this time, Cunningham's Gap could only be reached by a bridle trail.

Although railways were the priority for Queensland Government, the rise of the motor car increased the need for an expanded and improved road network. The Queensland Main Roads Act 1920 provided for responsibility for roads and bridges to be shared between state and local governments. The mission of the Main Roads Board, formed under this Act, was to develop a cohesive network of "main roads" partly funded by the state. Local governments would fund half the cost, and would be the construction and maintenance authorities where possible. The priority for road construction was to join towns not linked by railways; to link farming areas to existing railways; and to build developmental roads to open Crown lands for closer settlement.

The period between World War I and World War II saw a massive increase in car registrations and the revision of the Main Roads Act. By mid-1923 nearly 17,000 cars were registered in Queensland (rising to nearly 92,000 by 1934). As more people took to the car, the need for serviceable roads for motor vehicles became apparent. The Main Roads Acts Amendment Act 1925 abolished the Main Roads Board and formed the Main Roads Commission (MRC), and the board was replaced by John Kemp (formerly the board's chairman) as the commissioner.

In the early 1920s, the Cunningham's Gap Road Committee was formed, made up of community leaders and residents from throughout the Warwick district. Their intention was to find means for the construction of a proper road from Warwick to Cunningham's Gap and ultimately down the east slope of the range to Brisbane. The committee lobbied the Queensland government to fund the project; however, this initially proved unsuccessful. Preliminary investigations for a possible road to Cunningham's Gap were undertaken by several locals, concerned that Warwick's commercial prospects may be lost to Toowoomba if a direct and reliable road was not constructed.

On the Easter long-weekend of 1926, a working-bee took place following a call for volunteers by the road committee. Over 100 volunteers participated, with financial help donated through subscriptions. By the Monday, a drivable 3-mile (4.8 km) road had been cut through the forest from the western base of Cunningham's Gap to its precipice on the eastern side. On the Monday afternoon several of the district's dignitaries visited the newly formed road by car and it was reported:

"That this meeting of citizens of Warwick and district, held at Cunningham's Gap, this 5th day of April, 1926, desires to express its high appreciation of the efforts of the great band of voluntary workers who, in a spirit of devoted self-sacrifice and enthusiasm, have demonstrated the practicability of a road being constructed to the historic point which marked the crossing of the range by Allan Cunningham and the discovery of the Darling Downs about 100 years ago, and thereby making it further possible for the true realisation of the construction of the via recta route."

Although the forming of the road (as an unsurfaced track) was an achievement, it did not give free access to those wanting to visit Cunningham's Gap, as permission was needed from owners of the properties at the base of Cunningham's Gap in order to reach the new Gap road.

In conjunction with the road movement, the Allan Cunningham Centenary Committee, based in Warwick, was planning a fitting tribute for the 100-year anniversary of Cunningham's crossing of the Gap. An extension of the Cunningham's Gap road over the eastern side of the range to connect with the Fassifern Valley below was deemed appropriate. Additionally, a monument was to be erected at the top of the road to commemorate Allan Cunningham's achievement of crossing the pass. The date for the opening event was 11 June 1927, incorrectly believed to have been the centenary date of Cunningham's crossing (this was the date of the crossing of Spicer's Gap, with Cunningham's Gap being crossed one year later). Once again, subscriptions for funds were called for, as well as volunteers to construct the road extension.

Warwick-based architects, Dornbusch and Connolly, were responsible for the design of the monument. This enduring, successful and productive partnership began in 1910 when architect, Conrad Dornbusch (1867–1949), joined the experienced builder and architect Daniel Connolly (1867–1948) in partnership, with their office in Palmerin Street, Warwick. The firm designed many of the district's buildings including:

- St James' Hall
- Langham Hotel
- Second St Mary's Roman Catholic Church
- Johnson's Building
- Criterion Hotel
- the shelter shed at the Warwick General Cemetery

Connolly and Dornbusch were among the first architects registered by the Queensland Board of Architects in 1929, with their long running partnership ending with their retirement in 1945. Both partners were active participants in the community with Connolly serving on the Warwick City Council for 25 years, including as Mayor in 1910 and from 1924 to 1932 when the monument was constructed.

By April 1927 the plans for the monument's construction were well advanced, with the Main Roads Commissioner, John Kemp, having chosen the site for its construction at the summit of the pass. Drawings of the monument were published in various newspapers at the time, which reported that:

"It would be on a rock foundation of rustic design and formed of the spalls [broken stones] over which Cunningham had walked. It would be erected on a spot in the pass from which a glorious survey could be made."

The foundation stone of the monument was laid on 7 May 1927 by Mayor Connolly and attended by a small group of dignitaries, district residents and the men working on the construction of the road. It was claimed that "the cairn will break with startling suddenness on the wayfarer who has accomplished the climb or is on the eve of descending". Embedded within the concrete was a jar containing documents such as current newspapers, lists of serving dignitaries of the local councils and the Queensland Government at the time, a list of names of the volunteers and contractors who were working on the project, as well as coins. There were also two gifts of several pounds to be placed under the stone. The monument was complete by June 1927 and officially unveiled, as planned, on 11 June. Up to 700 people attended the opening ceremony which included dignitaries such as the acting premier, William Forgan Smith, and the main roads commissioner, Kemp. The tall obelisk was clad in locally sourced stone spalls, said to symbolise the ground on which Cunningham traversed. Prominent at the height of the pass, the monument was described as:

"definite and rugged. It stands within an almost complete circle of trees, its grey shape sharply contrasting with the greens of the forest".

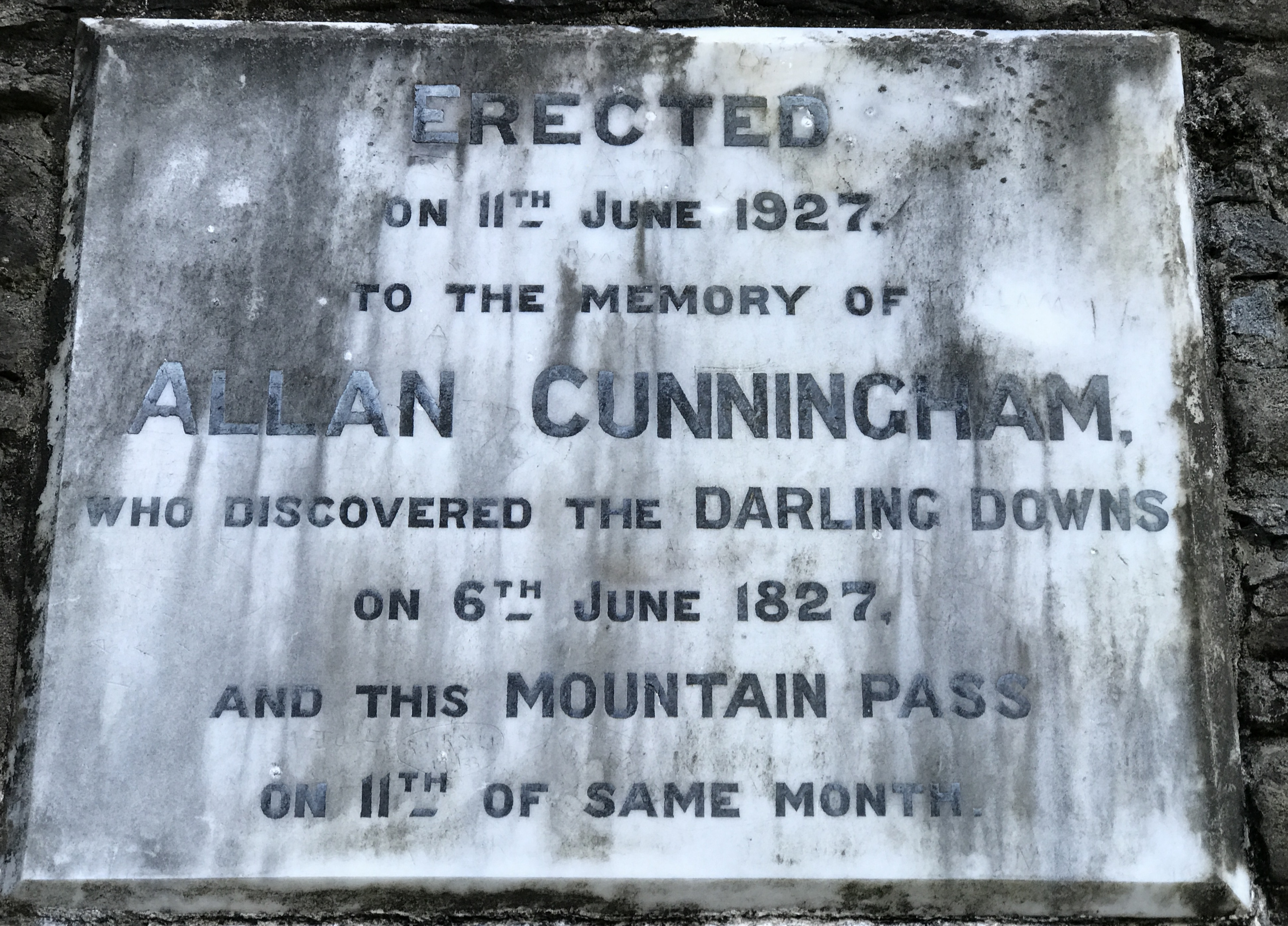
Plaque on the monument, 2017

Several memorial plaques were included on the plinth, in particular a plaque dedicated to Allan Cunningham and his exploration of the Gap. In photographs taken at the time of the unveiling, the monument was situated approximately 1 acre (0.40 ha) above the road's edge, which enabled visitors easy access to see it and its views.

Also, as planned, the road over the eastern side of the Gap was opened that afternoon, connecting the Fassifern Valley to the Darling Downs. Prior to the opening, another Easter working-bee had volunteers construct approximately 500 metres (1,600 ft) of road from the top of the pass down the steep incline to the east. The connecting part of the road to the bottom of the range had been contracted out. Following the acting premier's declaration that the road was open, the enthusiastic crowd cheered as the first car drove over the edge of the Gap and down the range.

In Queensland, during the interwar period to the mid-20th century, there was an enthusiasm in local communities for celebrating feats of colonial exploration which had facilitated European settlement of districts. The most popular way of marking these achievements at this time was the erection of commemorative objects dedicated to explorers and pioneers; these would often celebrate a centenary of the event. This was also a time when many Queensland communities were erecting war memorials to honour those who died and served in World War I. These community-based commemorative objects reflected the inextricable link between exploration and the economic development of regions such as the Darling Downs. They were simpler in form and decoration than statues and other monuments from the late 19th and early 20th centuries, which predominantly celebrated the British monarchy and political figures from the Federation period and were built in prominent public spaces by the government seeking to bolster state and civic authority. Until 1970, such commemorative plaques, statues and cairns reflected predominantly Eurocentric views in their topics and designs.

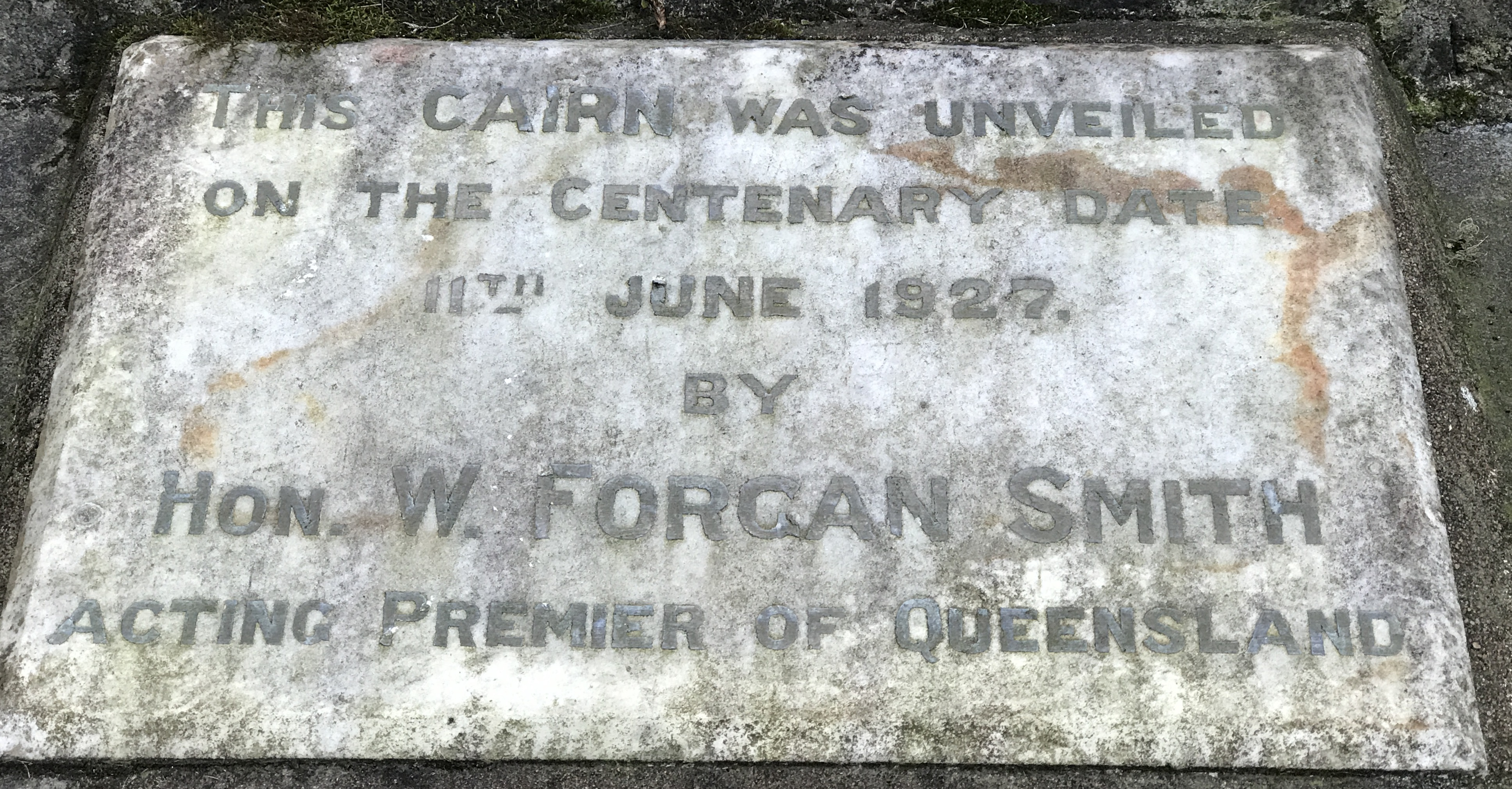
Plaque, 2017

A widely adopted form of monument to colonial exploration built during the interwar period to the mid-20th century was the masonry monument, with shared characteristics including formalised cairn in an obelisk, pyramid or rectilinear form, made of stone and/or concrete, and including one or several commemorative plaques. Humble in comparison to their late 19th to early 20th century predecessors, they were distinctively geometric and consistent compared to the relatively diverse range of monuments from the 1970s onwards. The Allan Cunningham Monument at Cunningham's Gap proved to be one of the largest of these types of monuments from this period. Others include:

- another to Cunningham in Ipswich's Queens Park (1934)
- the Burke and Wills Dig Tree at Thargomindah (1937)
- the Captain Cook Monument at Seventeen Seventy (1926)
- the John Oxley monument in the Brisbane CBD (1928)
- the monument to Henry Sinclair in Bowen (1934)
- several to Edmund Kennedy in Cardwell (1948), Cooktown (1948), and Mission Beach (1948)

Monuments such as these do not tell the whole story of post-colonial history; increasingly monuments dedicated to colonial exploration have been contested, as the impact of European settlement on Indigenous culture, traditions and ancestral lands is acknowledged more broadly in Australian society.

In July 1930, the road to Cunningham's Gap was gazetted as a tourist road by the Queensland Government. This was welcomed by the local authorities in the district, aware that the Main Roads Commission would fund further road improvement projects. Tourist roads were introduced by the Main Roads Commissioner in 1930 to provide safe vehicular access to beauty spots such as "National parks, waterfalls and camping grounds at high elevation at various parts of the state". The tourist road to Cunningham's Gap was one of the earliest introduced in Queensland under this scheme. Others included the Bunya Mountains road and that to Tully Falls in North Queensland.

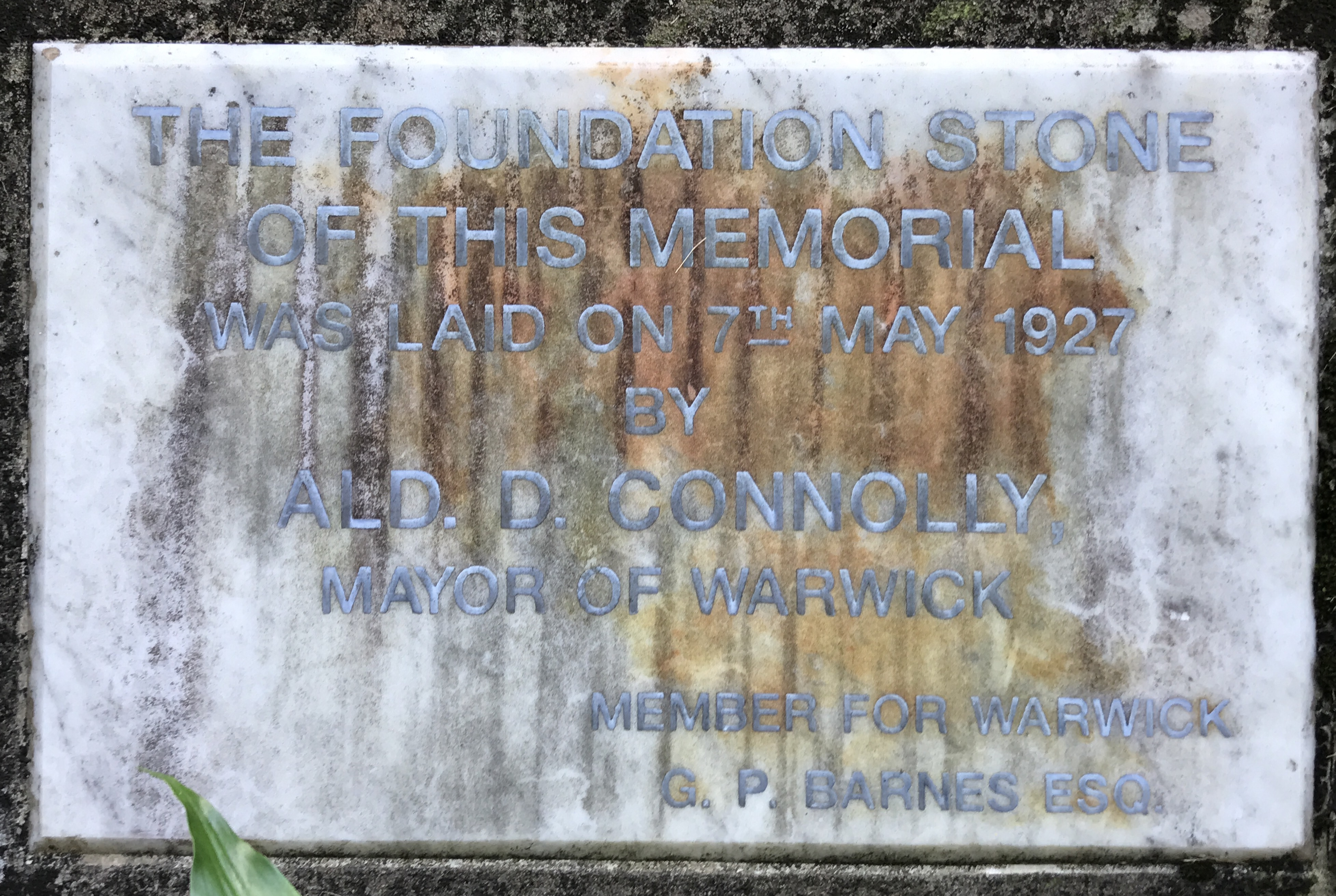
Plaque, 2017

Attracting tourists to the Gap and Warwick benefited the district's economy. As a tourist road, the Main Roads Commission could employ workers from the Unemployment Relief Scheme to work on its construction and maintenance. By 1932, a working party consisting of over 20 unemployed relief workers was making progress with the construction of the road from the base of the Gap, south-west to the intersection of the Warwick-Toowoomba Road, "[which] when complete a gravel road of nearly eight miles will lead to the top of the Gap". The Queensland Government gradually resumed land for the road from the private landowners through which the original track traversed. By this time, the road on the eastern slope of the range ascending from the Fassifern Valley had become difficult to drive over, with the Royal Automobile Club of Queensland (RACQ), which provided weekly Saturday reports to motorists, recommending caution before attempting the "rough and bumpy" road over the Gap, and suggesting it would prove easier to cross the range via Toowoomba's Toll Bar Road. However, in 1935, the Main Roads Commission declared the road the Cunningham Highway.

Through the 1930s, the Forestry Department made improvements to the facilities in the national park adjacent to the monument. These included the clearing of an area near the monument for a carpark, installation of toilet facilities, shelter sheds and picnic areas, and the introduction of paths from the cairn up to both Mount Mitchell to the south and Mount Cordeaux to the north. Nature enthusiasts and tourists alike visited the Allan Cunningham Monument, which not only marked an historical event, but became the focal point from which bushwalks in the national park started and finished.

In 1935, members of the National Parks Association of Queensland planted eleven hoop pines (Araucaria cunninghamii) on three sides of the monument. The pines were intended to further recognise Cunningham's contributions to exploration and botany. On his explorations into Queensland, Cunningham was the first to scientifically describe the hoop pine as a species; it was later named after him. The pines were planted to the west, north and east of the monument in a rectangular alignment. In 2022 there are eight of these mature hoop pines remaining.

A sealed and reliable road from Ipswich to Cunningham's Gap was constructed incrementally from the 1930s to the 1940s by the Main Roads Commission, and by 1949 had been completed, achieving the longed-for via recta route from Brisbane to Warwick. To accomplish this, the steep grade in the road on the eastern side of the range to the apex at Cunningham's Gap had to be reduced. Consequently, the cut was deepened forming large banks either side of the road and the monument now stood several metres above the road below. The sloping bank below the monument was clad in stone and a concrete and stone staircase was constructed approximately 10 metres (33 ft) east of the monument, to allow for pedestrian access to it from the road below. The road was declared open on 5 November 1949, in a ribbon cutting ceremony attended by many dignitaries, including the Mayor of Warwick, Alderman McCahon, and the Minister for Public Works, Housing and Local Government, William Power. Up to three hundred spectators also attended. With the reliable and safer road, the Mayor of Warwick stated that "it will prove a magnet that will draw thousands of visitors in Warwick and districts each year, and that people residing in the south and south-west will not fail to avail themselves of this road and will travel via the historic and attractive city of Warwick when visiting the capital city and surrounding seaside resorts".

The monument attracted visitors passing over the Gap as well as those enjoying bushwalks and picnics in the national park (now the Main Range National Park). Over the years, improvements have been made to the pathways and visitor facilities near the monument by the Queensland Parks and Wildlife Service. The monument has landmark qualities being easily seen when driving up to the high pass of Cunningham's Gap, as it looks out to the Fassifern Valley below. In 2021, the Department of Transport and Main Roads undertook restoration and cleaning work to the monument, which included repairs to and re-finishing of the cement-rendered base and painting of the obelisk-shaped enclosure posts. In 2022, the Allan Cunningham Monument remains in its original location and continues to draw tourists.

== Description ==
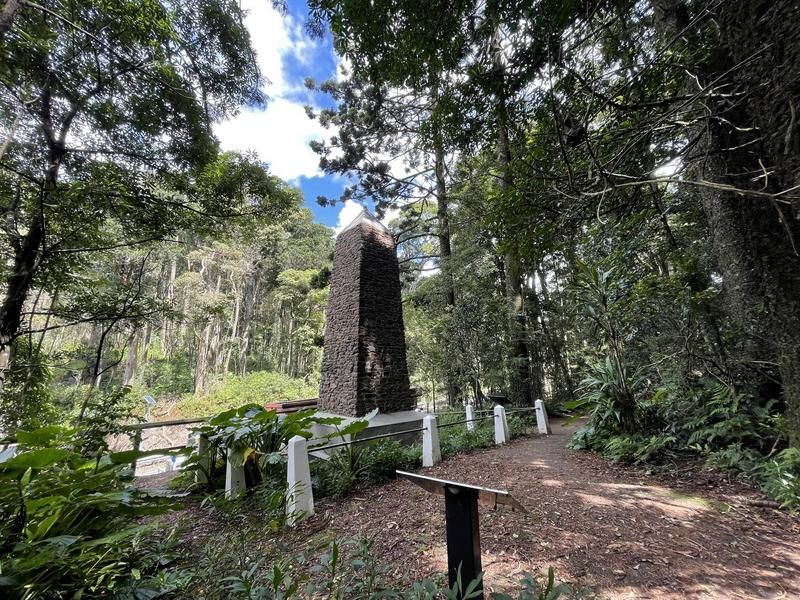
Allan Cunningham Monument, 2022

The Allan Cunningham Monument (1927) is located on the northern side of the Cunningham Highway at Cunningham's Gap, a mountain pass through the Great Dividing Range between Mount Cordeaux and Mount Mitchell. Situated at the peak of the pass surrounded by the sub-tropical rainforest of the Main Range National Park, part of the World Heritage-listed Gondwana Rainforests of Australia, the monument faces south to the road and is visible from the final bend of the eastern ascent.

The monument occupies a gently sloping elevated site, with a steep embankment down to the road on its southern side, and is accessed via walking tracks. It comprises a stone cairn in the form of an obelisk on a stepped cement-rendered base, standing within a low-fenced enclosure. Eight mature hoop pines (Araucaria cunninghamii), remainders of 11 planted in 1935) border the north, east, and west sides of the small clearing around the monument.

The monument stands approximately 5 metres (16 ft) high and is 3 by 3 feet (0.91 by 0.91 m) metres at its base. Three marble plaques fixed to the southern face of the obelisk and base commemorate the establishment of the monument and recognise the achievements of colonial explorer Allan Cunningham.

== Heritage listing ==
Allan Cunningham Monument was listed on the Queensland Heritage Register on 29 April 2022 having satisfied the following criteria.

The place is important in demonstrating the evolution or pattern of Queensland's history.

The Allan Cunningham Monument (1927), built to commemorate the centenary of the first European to locate Cunningham's Gap, is important in demonstrating the evolution of Queensland history, as it marks the place where explorer and botanist, Allan Cunningham (1791–1839), traversed the Great Dividing Range in 1828. The passage he documented, from the southeast coastal plains, over the pass through to the Darling Downs, enabled its pastoral and agricultural development from the early 19th century.

The construction of the Monument was driven by the local community who contributed half the cost of the memorial and the adjacent roadway, and assisted as volunteers in opening the roads to and past Cunningham's Gap.

The place is important in demonstrating the principal characteristics of a particular class of cultural places.

The Allan Cunningham Monument is a highly intact example of a monument to colonial exploration built in Queensland between the interwar period and the mid-20th century. It demonstrates the principal characteristics of its type, including: visible location marking an important site in colonial exploration; freestanding, formalised cairn in an obelisk, pyramid or rectilinear form, in this instance a spall-faced obelisk, and surrounded by open space; durable stone and concrete construction; and commemorative plaques listing the name/s of explorer/s and a record of its construction.

The place is important because of its aesthetic significance.

Situated at the peak of Cunningham's Gap and visible from the final bend of the eastern ascent of the Great Dividing Range, the Allan Cunningham Monument marks the transition into the Darling Downs and is of aesthetic significance for its landmark and architectural qualities. An excellent work of the regional architectural partnership Dornbusch & Connolly, the visual appeal of the tall masonry obelisk, with its simple rustic qualities, is enhanced by its landscape context setting, enclosed within a memorial grove of hoop pines (Araucaria cunninghamii), named for Allan Cunningham who collected the first specimens, surrounded by the mountainous sub-tropical rainforest of the Main Range National Park, part of the World Heritage-listed Gondwana Rainforests of Australia.

The place has a special association with the life or work of a particular person, group or organisation of importance in Queensland's history.

The Allan Cunningham Monument, including the memorial hoop pines, has a special association with the colonial explorer and botanist (1791–1839) who was the first European to document a pass in the Great Dividing Range from the southeast coastal plains through to the fertile plains of the Darling Downs in 1828. Erected in 1927 to commemorate the centenary of his finding the pass, and when a motor vehicle road through it was opened, the monument is located at what became known as Cunningham's Gap.
