= Cunningham Highway =

Highway in Queensland, Australia

Cunningham Highway Queensland
- Cunningham Highway (green and black)

General information
- Type: Highway
- Length: 327 km (203 mi)
- Route number(s): National Route 42; (Goondiwindi–Warwick); National Highway 15/A15; (Warwick–Yamanto); National Highway 15 (M15); (Yamanto–Riverview)

Major junctions
- West end: Newell Highway; Leichhardt Highway; Barwon Highway; Goondiwindi, Queensland NSW/Qld Border
- New England Highway; New England Highway; Boonah–Fassifern Road
- East end: Ipswich Motorway; Warrego Highway; Ipswich, Queensland

Location(s)
- Major settlements: Yelarbon, Inglewood, Warwick

Highway system
- Highways in Australia; National Highway • Freeways in Australia; Highways in Queensland

The Cunningham Highway is a 327-kilometre (203 mi) national highway located in south-eastern Queensland, Australia. The highway links the Darling Downs region with the urbanised outskirts of Ipswich via Cunninghams Gap.

The Cunningham carries the National Highway 15 shield between Ipswich and north of Warwick at its junction with the New England Highway at Glengallan where both the Cunningham and the New England head south concurrently to Warwick. Thereafter, the Cunningham carries the National Route 42 shield to its south-western terminus with the Leichhardt Highway at Goondiwindi. The majority of the Cunningham Highway is a single carriageway with freeway standard and 6-lane arterial road standard towards its north-eastern terminus, near Ipswich.

== State-controlled road ==
The Cunningham Highway is a state-controlled road, subdivided into four sections for administrative and funding purposes. Sections 17A, 17B, and part of 17D are part of the National Highway, while section 17C and part of section 17D are strategic roads. The sections are:

- 17A – Goodna to Ipswich
- 17B – Ipswich to Warwick
- 17C – Warwick to Inglewood
- 17D – Inglewood to Goondiwindi

State-controlled roads that intersect with the highway are listed in the main article.

== History ==
The highway is named in honour of the explorer and botanist Allan Cunningham who followed a route close to where the modern-day highway runs. In 1828 after discovering the route Cunningham sent a report to Governor Ralph Darling emphasising the economic benefits that a link between the coast and pastoral lands of the Darling Downs would provide. The first road between the coast and the Darling Downs was Spicers Gap Road developed in 1859, which crossed the range at Spicer's Gap and was suitable for the drays used at that time. Although Cunningham's Gap was known at that time, it was considered too steep a route for drays. With the opening of the Southern railway line between Toowoomba and Warwick in 1871, passenger and goods transport switched to the railways and Spicers Gap Road fell into disuse and was not well maintained due to the cost.

In the 1930s, the roads from Amberley to Aratula and from Warwick to Maryvale were both sealed, but because there was no road between Aratula and Maryvale, motorists wishing to travel from Ipswich to Warwick and beyond had to go via Gatton and Clifton. It wasn’t until 1946 that construction began on a road through Cunningham’s Gap. The new sealed road through the gap was eventually opened in November 1949.

== Route ==
The north-eastern terminus of the Cunningham Highway is situated a short distance west of where the Warrego Highway reaches its eastern terminus with the Ipswich Motorway, at Riverview, a suburb of Ipswich. From this point, the Cunningham Highway heads south-west, bypassing the busy Ipswich central business district and the original path of the highway, now named Warwick Road. Between the commencement of the route at Riverview and Ripley Road at Flinders View, the highway is a 4 lane dual carriageway, constructed to Motorway standard with a speed limit of 100, and grade-separated interchanges. From here, the highway transitions to a 'Super 2' expressway, consisting of a 2 lane undivided carriageway, through to Warwick Road, Yamanto. From here, the route transitions from motorway standard to highway standard. The highway then continues past the Willowbank Raceway, and then through the Scenic Rim region, passing through Warrill View, the Fassifern Valley and Aratula. The Scenic Rim section of the Highway is 2 lanes each way with at-grade intersections, no emergency shoulders and varying speed limits.

After the town of Aratula, the Cunningham Highway begins its ascent across the Great Dividing Range via a mountain pass at an elevation of 787 metres (2,582 ft) above sea level called Cunninghams Gap, situated in the Main Range National Park, between the peaks of Mount Cordeaux and Mount Mitchell.

As the Cunningham Highway descends through the Southern Downs region and west adjacent to the settlement of Maryvale, it reaches a major junction with the New England Highway near Eastments Ridge approximately 14 kilometres (8.7 mi) north of Warwick. The two highways run south to Warwick, sharing the National Route 15 shield and cross the Condamine River before the concurrency terminates and the New England Highway runs south, carrying the National Highway 15 shield; and the Cunningham heads west by south-west through Inglewood, Yelarbon, before reaching its south-western terminus on the outskirts of Goondiwindi.

Within close proximity of Goondiwindi, the Cunningham Highway links to the Newell, Leichhardt, and Barwon highways, with the Bruxner Highway nearby.

== Towns on the Cunningham Highway ==
From northeast to southwest, the following towns and settlements are located on the Cunningham Highway:

- Ipswich
- Warrill View
- Aratula
- Warwick
- Inglewood
- Yelarbon
- Goondiwindi

== Upgrades ==
=== Highway upgrades ===
A lead project to plan and conduct upgrades to the highway, at a total cost of $212.5 million, was in the planning phase in November 2021. The $25 million intersection upgrade described below is included in this project.

=== Intersection upgrade ===
A project to upgrade the intersection with the New England Highway east of Warwick, at a cost of $25 million, was due for completion in August 2022.

=== Reconstruction works ===
A project to reconstruct sections of the highway at Cunninghams Gap following bushfire damage, at a cost of $84.27 million, was due to start construction in early 2022.

=== Safety upgrades ===
A project to identify safety issues and propose solutions between Warwick and Inglewood, at a cost of $275,000, was under way in January 2022.

== Major exits and intersections ==
LGA	Location	km	mi	Destinations	Notes
Ipswich	Riverview	0	0.0	Ipswich Motorway (National Route M2) east – Brisbane, Gold Coast, Sunshine Coast	North western terminus via motorway-grade underpass
Ipswich	Riverview	0	0.0	Warrego Highway (National Route M2) west – Toowoomba	No westbound exit to M2 westbound; No southwest bound entrance from M2 eastbound
Ipswich	Blackstone	4.6	2.9	Redbank Plains Road (State Route 61) – Redbank Plains, Blackstone	Southwest bound exit and northeast bound entrance
Ipswich	Blackstone	5.7	3.5	Redbank Plains Road (State Route 61) – Blackstone, Redbank Plains	Northeast bound exit and southwest bound entrance
Ipswich	Raceview	7.7	4.8	Swanbank Road – Swanbank, Raceview	Southwest bound exit and southwest bound entrance
Ipswich	Raceview	8.8	5.5	South Station Road – Raceview, Swanbank	Northeast bound exit and northeast bound entrance
Ipswich	Flinders View	9.8	6.1	Ripley Road – Flinders View, Ripley	Southwest bound exit and southwest bound entrance; Northeast bound exit and northeast bound entrance
Ipswich	Deebing Heights, Yamanto, Purga	14.3	8.9	Centenary Highway (State Route A5)	No southbound exit to A5 southwest bound; No northeast bound entrance from A5 northbound
Ipswich	Deebing Heights, Yamanto, Purga	14.9	9.3	Ipswich–Boonah Road south (State Route 93) – Boonah	
Ipswich	Deebing Heights, Yamanto, Purga	14.9	9.3	Warwick Road north – Yamanto	
Ipswich	Deebing Heights, Yamanto, Purga	15.7	9.8		End of motorway conditions, beginning of highway conditions southwest bound; End of highway conditions, beginning of motorway conditions northeast bound (M15) becomes (A15)
Ipswich	Willowbank	19.2	11.9	Ipswich-Rosewood Road northwest – Amberley	
Scenic Rim	Fassifern	56.5	35.1	Boonah–Fassifern Road east (State Route 90) – Boonah	
Southern Downs	Glengallan	115.6	71.8	New England Highway (State Route A3) north – Toowoomba	A15 northern concurrency terminus
Southern Downs	Warwick	126.6	78.7	Condamine River	Bridge over river
Southern Downs	Warwick	129.4	80.4	New England Highway (National Route A15) south – Stanthorpe / New South Wales	A15 southern concurrency terminus
Southern Downs	Warwick	129.4	80.4		Cunningham Highway continues as (National Route 42)
Southern Downs	Karara	178	111	Toowoomba Karara Road (State Route 48) north – Leyburn	
Goondiwindi	Oman Ama, Coolmunda	216.7	134.7	Stanthorpe Inglewood Road (Alternate State Route 89) south – Stanthorpe	Eastern concurrency terminus for Alternate State Route 89
Goondiwindi	Inglewood	234.4	145.6	Millmerran–Inglewood Road (State Route 82) north – Milmerran	
Goondiwindi	Inglewood	236.4	146.9	Inglewood–Texas Road (State Route 89) south – Texas	Western concurrency terminus for Alternate State Route 89
Goondiwindi	Goondiwindi	324.2	201.4	Leichhardt Highway (National Route A39) west via bypass – St George, Brisbane and Rockhampton / (to Barwon Highway (State Route 85) – Nindigully)	Bypass does not carry the shields, although named as the Leichhardt Highway
Goondiwindi	Goondiwindi	327	203	Marshall Street west to Barwon Highway (State Route 85) – Goondiwindi town centre, St George / Nindigully; Newell Highway (National Route A39) south – Macintyre River to New South Wales	South-western highway terminus at roundabout
1.000 mi = 1.609 km; 1.000 km = 0.621 mi: Concurrency terminus; Incomplete access; Route transition

== Gallery ==
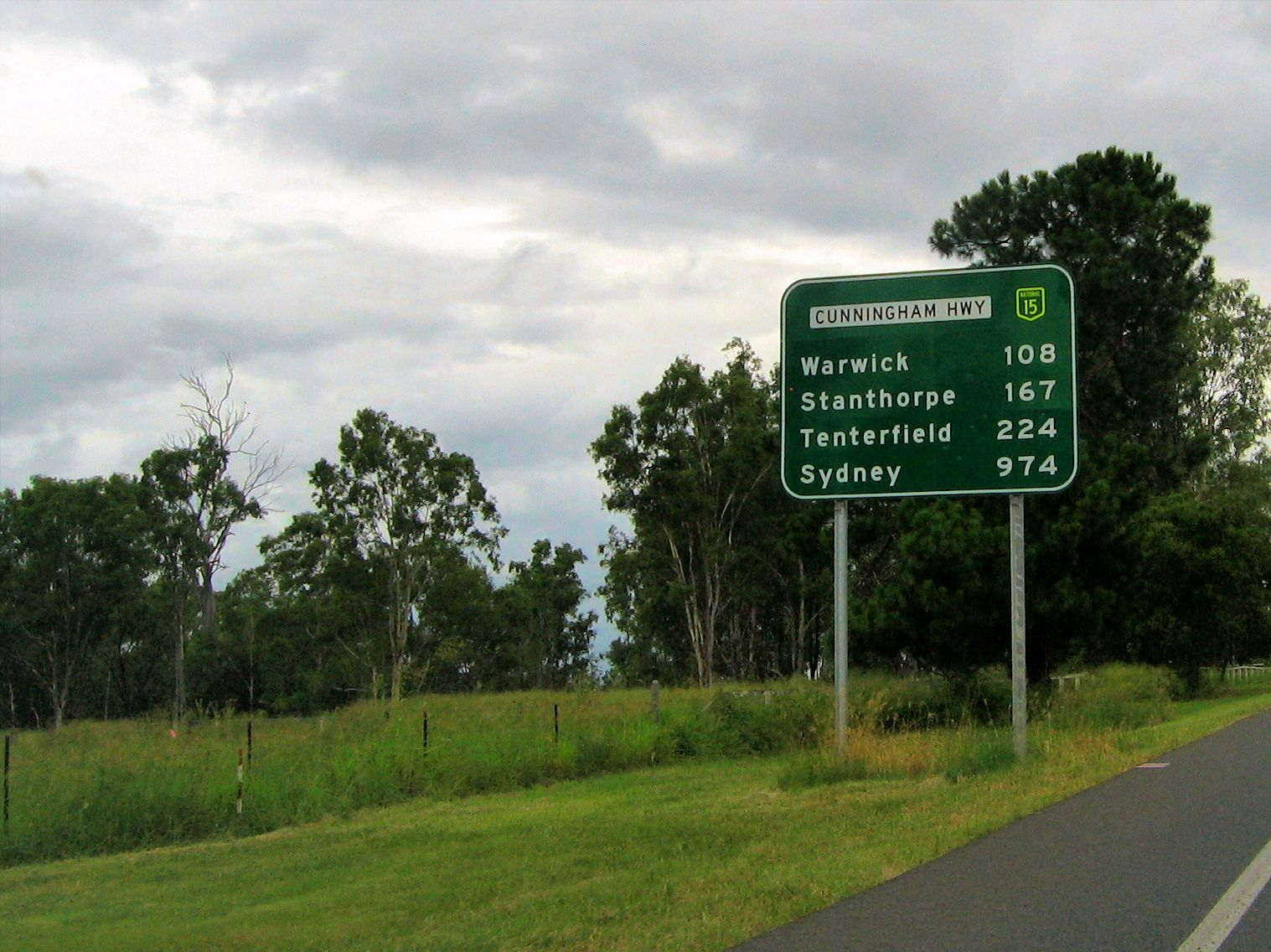
section under conversion to

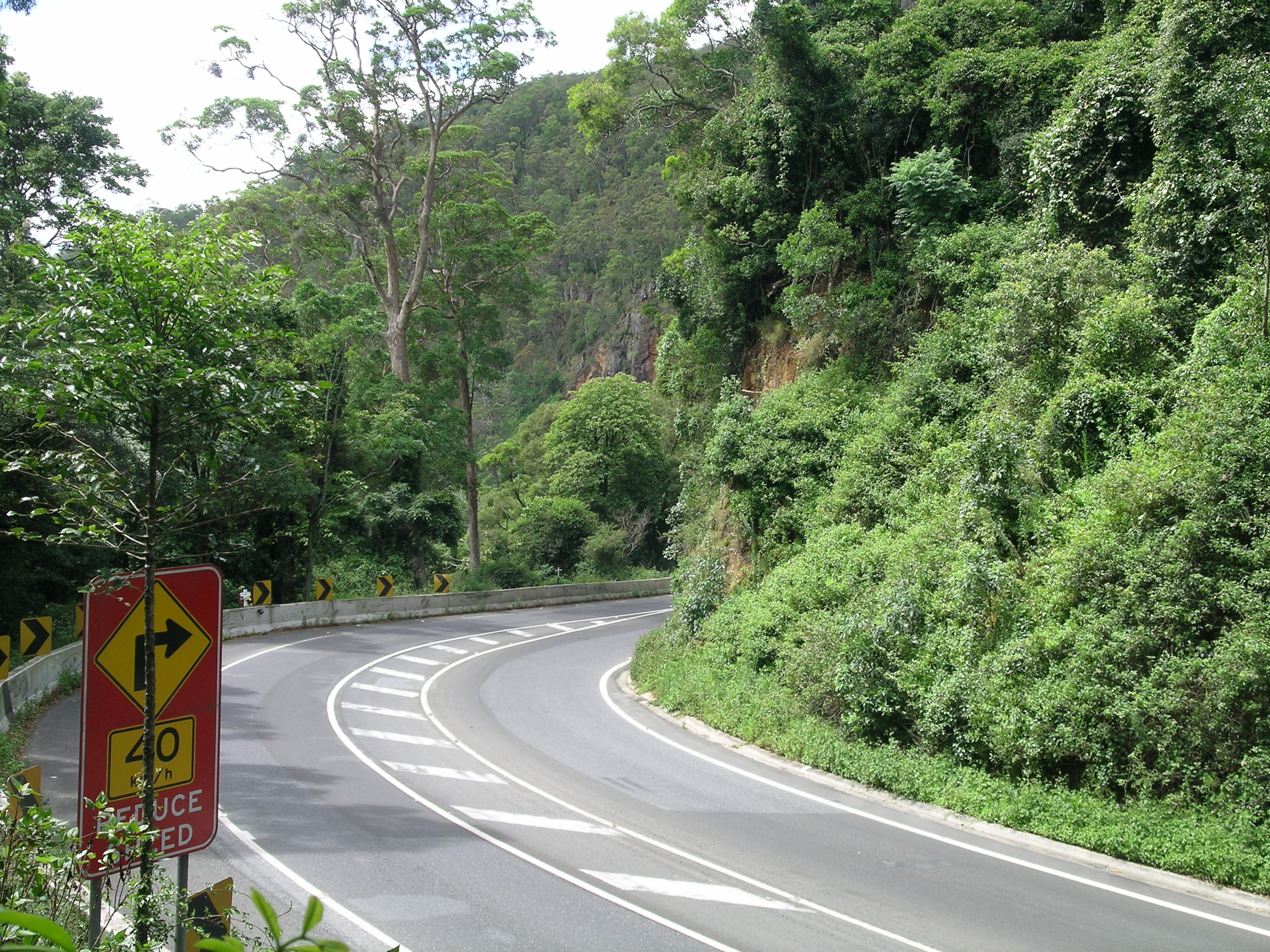
Cunningham Highway at Cunningham's Gap

== See also ==
- Highways in Australia
- List of highways in Queensland
