= Allan Cunningham (botanist) =

English botanist and explorer (1791–1839)

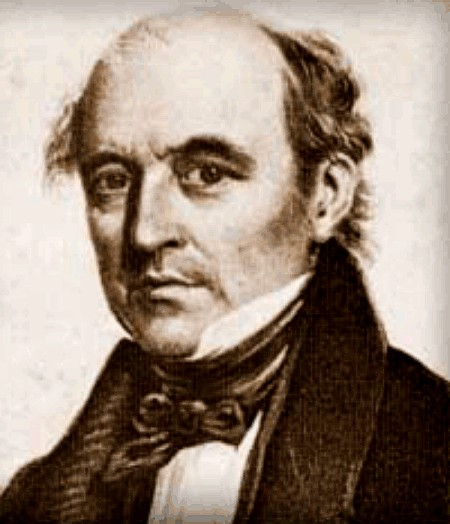
- Born: 13 July 1791; Wimbledon, London, England
- Died: 27 June 1839 (aged 47); Sydney, New South Wales, Australia
- Occupations: Botanist, explorer
- Years active: 1814−1838
- Known for: Exploration of eastern Australia
- Relatives: Richard Cunningham (brother)
- Scientific career
- Author abbrev. (botany): A.Cunn.

Allan Cunningham (13 July 1791 – 27 June 1839) was an English botanist and explorer, primarily known for his expeditions into uncolonised areas of eastern Australia to collect plants and report on the suitability of the land for grazing purposes. The standard author abbreviation A.Cunn. is used to indicate this person as the author when citing a botanical name.

== Early life ==
Cunningham was born in Wimbledon, England, the son of Allan Cunningham (head gardener at Wimbledon Park House), who came from Renfrewshire, Scotland, and his English wife Sarah (née Juson/Jewson née Dicken). Allan Cunningham was educated at a Putney private school, Reverend John Adams Academy, and then went into a solicitor's office (a Lincoln's Inn Conveyancer).

== Brazil ==
On Banks' recommendation, Cunningham went to Brazil with James Bowie between 1814 and 1816 collecting specimens for Kew Gardens. Banks later wrote that Cunningham's collections of orchids and bulbs from this part of South America contributed much honour to the Royal Gardens.

== New South Wales ==
He was soon ordered to the colony of New South Wales and on 28 September 1816 he sailed for Sydney where he arrived on 20 December 1816.

=== Botanist on Oxley's 1817 expedition ===
Cunningham joined John Oxley's 1817 expedition beyond the Blue Mountains to the Lachlan and Macquarie rivers and shared in the privations of the 1,200-mile (1,900 km) journey. He collected specimens of about 450 species. Cunningham named the species Acacia pendula and Eucalyptus dumosa during the expedition.

=== Botanist on P.P. King's 1817–1822 circumnavigation voyages ===
Cunningham traveled as the ship's botanist aboard HMS Mermaid under Phillip Parker King from 1817 to 1820.

Cunningham made an excursion south from Sydney, ascending the prominent peak of Mount Keira overlooking the Illawarra region and present day Wollongong.

One of these was after the ship reached the mouth of the Endeavour River (the site of modern Cooktown) on 28 June 1819.

Cunningham provided a chapter on botany to King's Narrative of a Survey.

=== 1823 exploration for a pass over the Liverpool Range ===
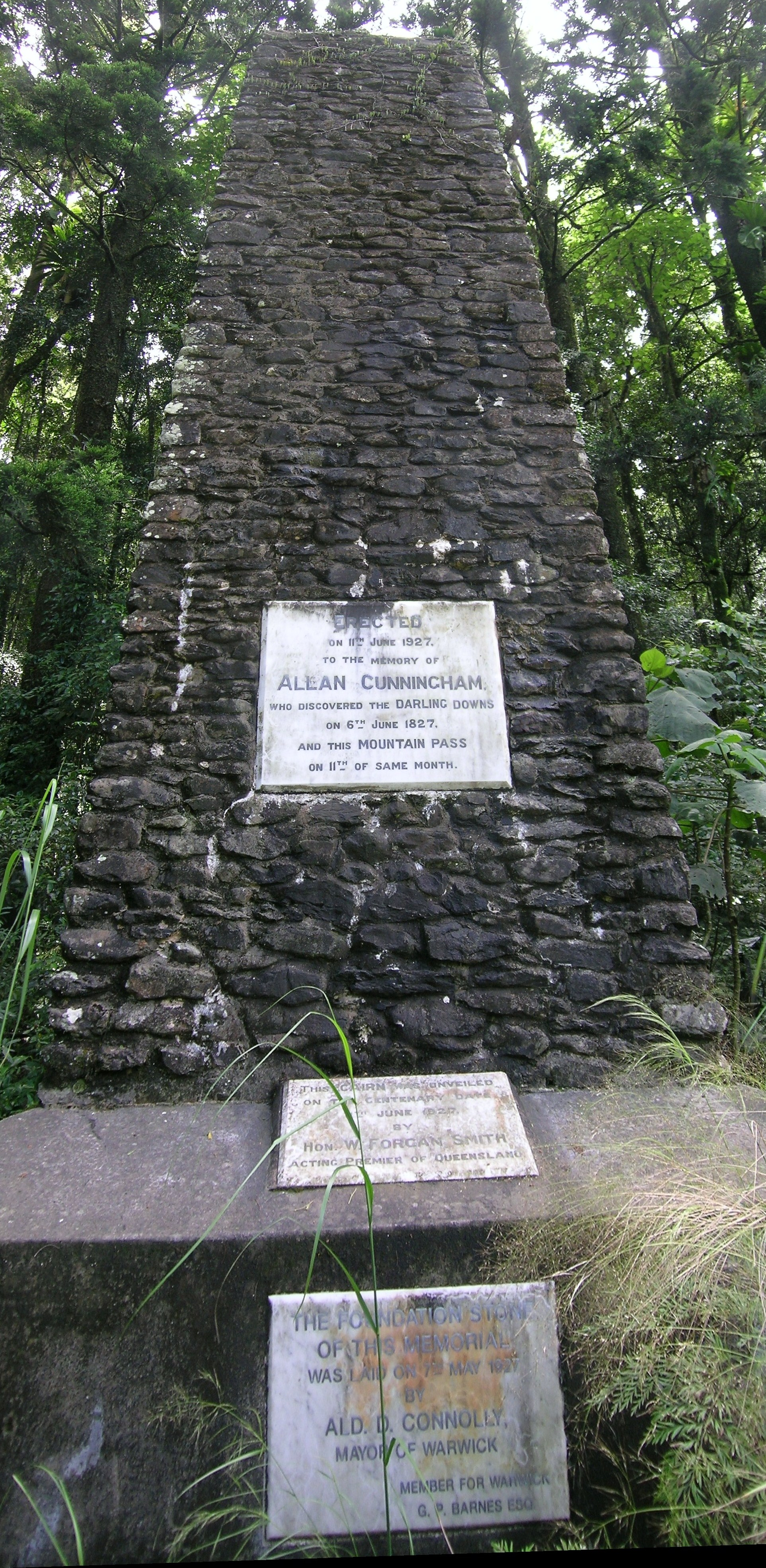
Memorial to Allan Cunningham's "discovery" of Cunningham's Gap, Cunningham Highway

Cunningham soon became more interested in expeditions of discovery than botany and in 1823 he set out from Bathurst to explore inside the Great Dividing Range. With five men and five horses, he journeyed north from Bathurst, along the Cudgegong River, passing through what is now Rylstone and Coolah and then eastwards looking for a pass through the Liverpool Range. Unable to find one, he returned west through what is now Merriwa and then north to the base of the ranges there. On 7 June, after some difficult climbing, he came across a gap in the mountains which he named Pandora's Pass, which he thought would allow for a practicable road to the Liverpool Plains. This pass was soon superseded however by more accessible passes found to the east. He returned to Bathurst through an undeveloped Mudgee on 27 June 1823.

Cunningham also undertook an expedition to what is now Canberra in 1824. He travelled with three convicts, three horses and a cart and he travelled via Lake Bathurst, Captains Flat and the valley of the Queanbeyan River. Poor weather prevented him from continuing his journey south.

=== Voyage to Moreton Bay in 1824 ===
In September 1824 Cunningham accompanied John Oxley on his second expedition to Moreton Bay and explored up the Brisbane River.

=== 1827 exploration of discovery to the Darling Downs ===
In probably his most famous expedition, Cunningham set out to explore the area to the west of Moreton Bay in 1827, crossing to the west of the Great Dividing Range from the Hunter Valley and travelling north. On this journey, Cunningham named many geographical landmarks including the Dumaresq River, Macintyre River, Condamine River, the Darling Downs, Mount Dumaresq and the Burrell or Gwydir River. He wrote in his diary that the lush grassland plains on the Darling Downs were ideal for livestock grazing. Exploring around Mount Dumaresq, Cunningham found a pass, now known as Cunninghams Gap.

=== Further exploration of the Moreton Bay region ===
Cunningham returned to the Moreton Bay penal colony in 1828, setting off from Brisbane with Patrick Logan, Charles Fraser and five men to find Mount Warning and to establish the route to Cunninghams Gap which he did, on 24 July. The peaks on either side of the gap were also named, Mount Cordeaux and Mount Mitchell. After exploring the McPherson Range area, Cunningham travelled on the south side of the Gap whereas present-day Cunningham Highway (named after him) today runs further north, through the gap, from the small township of Aratula. Spicers Gap which runs parallel to Cunninghams Gap was actually the pass first identified by Cunningham in 1827. After its rediscovery in 1847, Spicers Gap was used as a stagecoach route. In 1829, Cunningham explored the Brisbane River.

== Contributions to botany ==
Australia's most prolific plant collector of the early nineteenth century, Cunningham had been sent to Australia to expand the collection at the King's Garden at Kew and he was given the title of "King's Collector for the Royal Garden at Kew". He was so successful that a hothouse originally built for specimens from Africa was renamed "Botany Bay House" because it became filled with Cunningham's specimens. Although his main role was to collect propagation material, his lasting legacy are his herbarium sheets which are thought by his biographer, Anthony Orchard, to exceed 20,000.

It is often thought that Cunningham published few papers on botany and in his obituary, John Lindley wrote, "How little he regarded posthumous fame is seen by the fewness of his published works, a brief sketch of the Flora of New Zealand being the only systematic account of his Botanical discoveries...". In fact, although he was effectively barred from publishing on botany whilst employed as "King's Collector", he nevertheless later published seven major papers, and 57 shorter papers on subjects including taxonomy, geology, physical geography and zoology. He was one of the first scientists to publish papers on botanical geography.

Cunningham was concerned that many of his discoveries sent to Kew were not published, allowing others, including William Baxter to be credited with their discovery. (Baxter had risked arrest and a possible flogging for undermining Cunningham's work by sending specimens to commercial interests.) When Cunningham returned to London, he sent duplicates of his herbarium specimens to other botanists, including de Candolle, Schauer, William Jackson Hooker, Bentham, Lindley and others, who published his descriptions with acknowledgement to "A.Cunn.".

== Later life ==
In 1831, Cunningham returned to England, but went back to Australia in 1837 on board Norfolk as government botanist, resigning the following year. On 27 June 1839, he died of tuberculosis in Sydney, and was buried in the Devonshire Street Cemetery. In 1901, his remains were "reverently removed" and re-interred in an obelisk within the Royal Botanic Garden in Sydney.

== Works ==
- "Brief View of the Progress of Interior Discovery in New South Wales". Journal of the Royal Geographical Society of London. 2: 99–132. 1832. doi:10.2307/1797758. ISSN 0266-6235. Wikidata Q108673781.

== Legacy ==
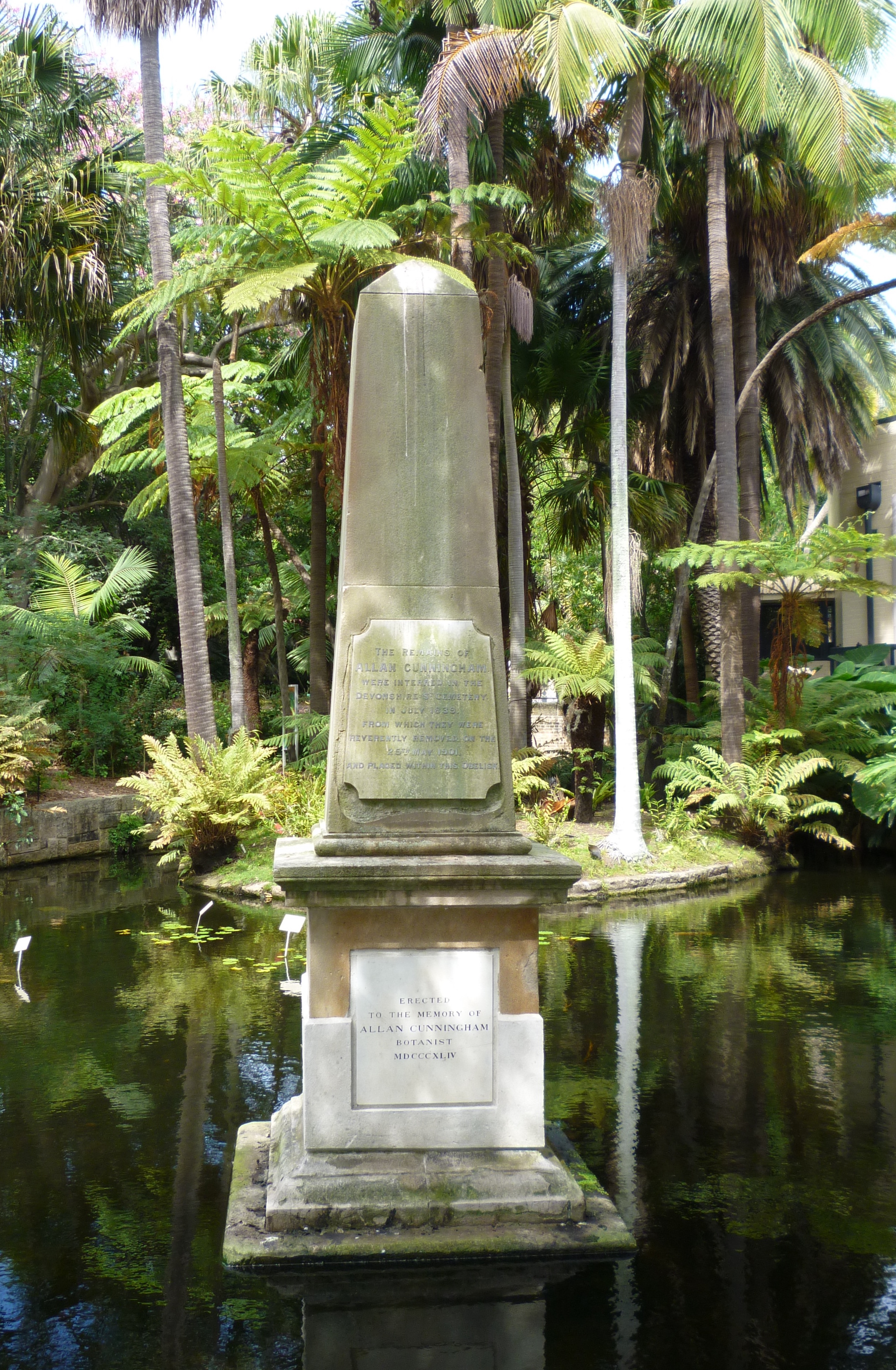
Cunningham memorial obelisk in the Royal Botanic Garden, Sydney

Some of Australia's plants: Araucaria cunninghamii (hoop pine), Archontophoenix cunninghamiana (Bangalow palm), Banksia cunninghamii, Lysiphyllum cunninghamii (jigal), Casuarina cunninghamiana (river sheoak), Centipeda cunninghamii (old man weed), Ficus cunninghamii, Medicosma cunninghamii (bone wood), Nothofagus cunninghamii (myrtle tree, Tasmania), Pennantia cunninghamii (brown beech), and Polyosma cunninghamii (rainforest featherwood) commemorate Allan and his brother Richard, a botanist. The Cunningham Highway is named in honour of Allan. The genus Alania was created by Endlicher in Cunningham's honour. Robert Brown named the conifer genus Cunninghamia after both Allan Cunningham and Dr. James Cunningham, a British doctor who introduced the trees into cultivation in 1702.

A species of Australian lizard, Egernia cunninghami, is named in honour of Allan Cunningham.

The Australian federal seat of Cunningham, which stretches from Port Kembla in the south of Wollongong to Heathcote in southern Sydney, was named after him in honour of his being the first European explorer to visit the Illawarra region.

The locality of Allan, Queensland was named after him.

== See also ==
- Allan Cunningham Monument at Cunninghams Gap
