= Norfolk (1814 ship) =

History

United Kingdom
- Name: Norfolk
- Owner: 1814:Corney & Co.; 1822:A. Grieg
- Builder: Littlehampton
- Launched: 1814
- Fate: Wrecked 1837

General characteristics
- Type: Barque
- Tons burthen: 536, or 537, or 547 (bm)
- Propulsion: Sail
- Armament: 8 × 6-pounder guns

Norfolk was built at Littlehampton, England in 1814. She was originally a West Indiaman, and then sailed to India and Quebec. She made four voyages transporting convicts from England to Australia, one voyage from Ireland to Australia and one from Madras and Mauritius to Australia. She was wrecked on 7 July 1837.

== Career ==
Norfolk first appeared in Lloyd's Register in 1815 with S.Sayer, master, and London ownership. The Register of Shipping gives the master's name as Sayers and the owner as Corney. Both registers give her launch year as 1813 and her trade as London–Trinidad.

This information remained unchanged until 1818 when Lloyd's Register showed her master and owner as L. Edwards. Both registers showed her trade as London–Bengal, though the Register of Shipping retained Corney as owner.

In 1813 the EIC had lost its monopoly on the trade between India and Britain. British ships were then free to sail to India or the Indian Ocean under a license from the EIC. Although Norfolk doesn't appear on lists of licensed ships until 1822, she apparently had already begun trading with India.

On 2 May 1820 Norfolk, Lutey, master, arrived at Madras but heavy surf prevented her from landing anything but dispatches and passengers. A heavy gale between 8 ad 10 May drove her and the other vessels in Madras Roads out to sea. Norfolk and two brigs had not returned by the 26th and it was believed that she had sailed on to Bengal.

The Register of Shipping for 1822 showed Norfolk's master changing from Lutey to A. Grieg, her owner from Corney to A. Grieg, and her trade from London–Calcutta to London–Madras.

The Register of Shipping for 1825 showed Norfolk's master changing from Brown to Grieg, and her trade from London–Quebec to London–New South Wales. She had undergone small repairs the year before.

First convict voyage (1825): Captain Alexander Greig and surgeon William Hamilton sailed from Portsmouth on 17 April 1825 and arrived in Sydney on 18 August 1825. Norfolk had embarked 180 male convicts; there were two convict deaths en route.

Second convict voyage (1829): Captain Greig and surgeon J. Dickson departed Spithead on 22 May 1829 and arrived in Sydney on 27 August. Norfolk had embarked 200 male convicts; she had no convict deaths en route. This voyage lasted 96 days, setting a new record. Had she not had to stop at Gibraltar for 10 days to fix a leak she might have made an even faster run. Among the convicts were seven Greeks who had been convicted in 1828 in Malta for piracy and had been sentenced to transportation. They were however unwilling, the first Greek immigrants to Australia.

Between 9 and 21 January 1830, Norfolk was at the Swan River Colony, having come from Sydney. She may have been carrying 105 officers and men to India from New South Wales, probably from the 39th Regiment of Foot, which the 63rd Regiment of Foot was replacing.

Third convict voyage (1831): Captain William Henniker and surgeon William Clifford departed Cork, Ireland on 15 October 1831 and arrived in Sydney on 9 February 1832. Norfolk had embarked 199 male convicts, and had four convict deaths en route.

Fourth convict voyage (1832): She departed Madras on 24 July 1832 and stopped at Mauritius. She left there on 31 October with 15 military prisoners. Norfolk sailed via Hobart on 19 December and arrived in Sydney on 30 December 1832.

Fifth convict voyage (1835): Captain John Gatenby and surgeon Arthur Savage departed Sheerness on 14 May 1835 and arrived in Hobart Town on 28 August 1835. Norfolk had embarked 280 male convicts and had no convict deaths en route.

Norfolk was last listed in Lloyd's Register in 1837 with Gatenby, master, T. Ward, owner, and trade London–Sydney.

Sixth convict voyage (1837): Captain Gatenby and surgeon John Inches departed Portsmouth on 30 October 1836 and arrived in Sydney on 12 February 1837. Norfolk had embarked 280 male convicts and had two convict deaths en route. Two officers from the 80th Regiment of Foot and 29 rank-and-file from the 28th and 80th regiments provided the guard. On this voyage Norfolk also carried as a passenger Allan Cunningham, the explorer and botanist, who was coming out to take up the post of Colonial Botanist.

== Fate ==
Norfolk sailed from Sydney on 8 March, bound to Guam in ballast. From there she sailed to Papudo, Chile, where she arrived in June. She took on some cargo and sailed on to San Antonio, Chile, to complete her cargo. A gale came up on 6 July that tore Norfolk from her anchors and dashed her on a reef. Captain Gatenby and his crew were able to fashion a raft from spars and planks that enabled them all to reach shore weak but alive. Her cargo was completely lost. By one report the cargo was wheat for Sydney.
