= Cunninghams Gap =

Mountain pass in Queensland, Australia

Coordinates: 28.050°S 152.385°E

- Cappoong
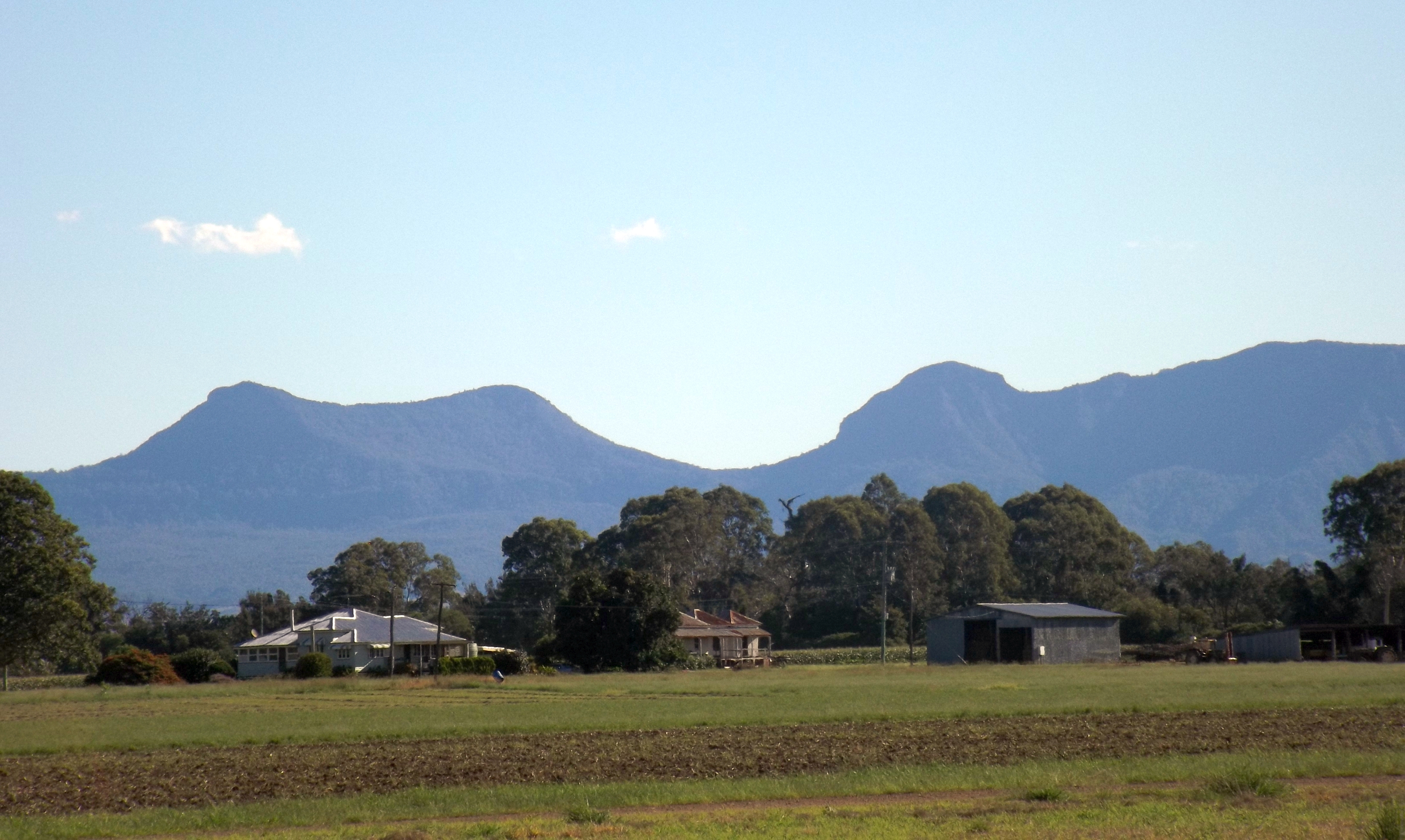
- View from Kents Lagoon, 2015
- Interactive map of Cunninghams Gap
- Elevation: 787 m (2,582 ft)
- Traversed by: Allan Cunningham

Third Approach
- Location: Tarome, South East Queensland, Queensland
- Range: Main Range

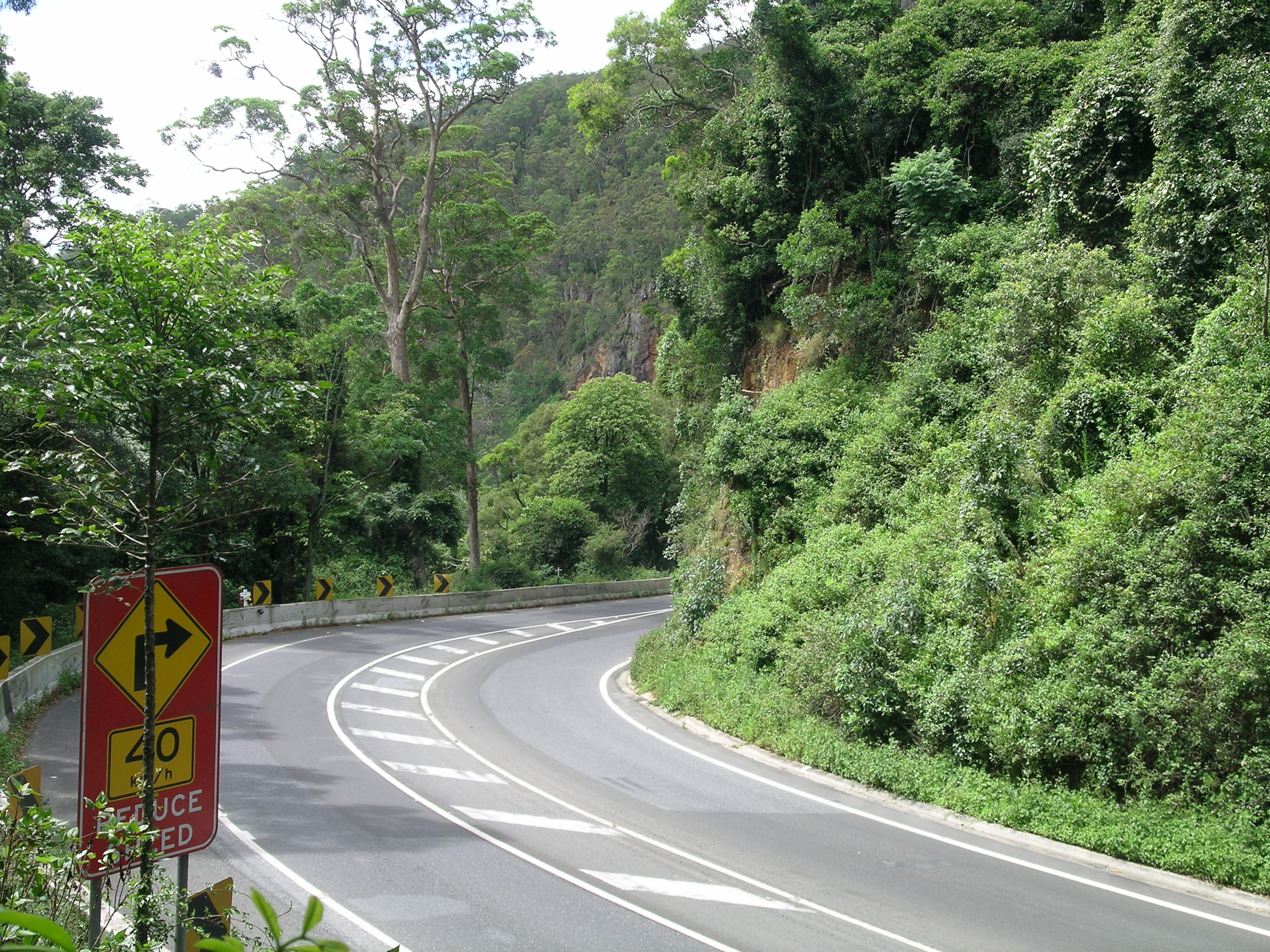
Cunningham Highway, Cunninghams Gap, 2009

Cunninghams Gap is a pass over the Great Dividing Range between the Darling Downs and the Fassifern Valley in Queensland, Australia. The Gap is the major route over the Main Range along the Great Dividing Range, between Warwick and Brisbane. The Cunningham Highway was built to provide road transport between the two regions.

It is situated in Main Range National Park, between the peaks of Mount Cordeaux and Mount Mitchell. On a clear day the pass forms a distinct break in Main Range's profile as seen from Brisbane. It is located in Tregony in the Southern Downs Region immediately beside the boundary to Tarome in the Scenic Rim Region local government area.

The highway itself is a scenic drive although steep with an eight degree grade on the descent.

== History ==
The Indigenous name for the location is Cappoong, though the meaning is unknown. The local Indigenous people have a legend about the creation of the gap. In the dreamtime, the Yuggera people rounded up all the kangaroos in the area and fenced them into the valley west of Minto Crags (Whinpullin) to prevent other tribes from catching them. However, an old woman set them free. As they stampeded across the Great Dividing Range they tore a gap between Mount Mitchell (Coonyin-nirra) and Mount Cordeaux (Niamboyoo).

In 1827, Allan Cunningham set out from the upper Hunter River, to explore west of the Dividing Range, exploring the Darling Downs; returning in 1828 from Brisbane to explore Cunninghams Gap. He was aware of the economic benefits that a link between the coast and pastoral lands to the west would provide. Cunningham travelled on the right-hand side of the Gap whereas the highway today runs on the left-hand side from Aratula.

On 3 July 1909, Cunninghams Gap was declared a national park. This new park, which originally consisted of 3,100 acres, was located on the western side of the range and included Gap Creek. Walking tracks were constructed in the 1930s and 1950s.

On 11 June 1927, the 100-year anniversary of Allan Cunningham's exploration of the Darling Downs, the new road through Cunninghams Gap was officially opened by the local Member of Parliament, Sir Littleton Groom. Although the road, which was built entirely by volunteers, was officially open, travelling along this new route was inadvisable, especially on the portion west of Aratula. The road was plagued by problems during this early embryonic stage with the Royal Automobile Club of Queensland announcing that the road was closed, less than one month after it was officially opened. The new sealed road through the gap was eventually opened in November 1949.

=== Road transport ===
Cunninghams Gap is part of the Cunningham Highway, a federally funded highway managed by the Queensland Department of Transport and Main Roads. Between December 2010 and March 2011, the Gap experienced over two metres of rainfall and it sustained an enormous amount of damage. The cost of repairing this seven kilometre stretch of road is projected to be $40 million. Work is being undertaken by the Department of Transport and Main Roads in partnership with engineering firm Coffey.

== See also ==
- Allan Cunningham Monument
- Spicers Gap
