= Seventeen Seventy, Queensland =

Seventeen Seventy
- Town
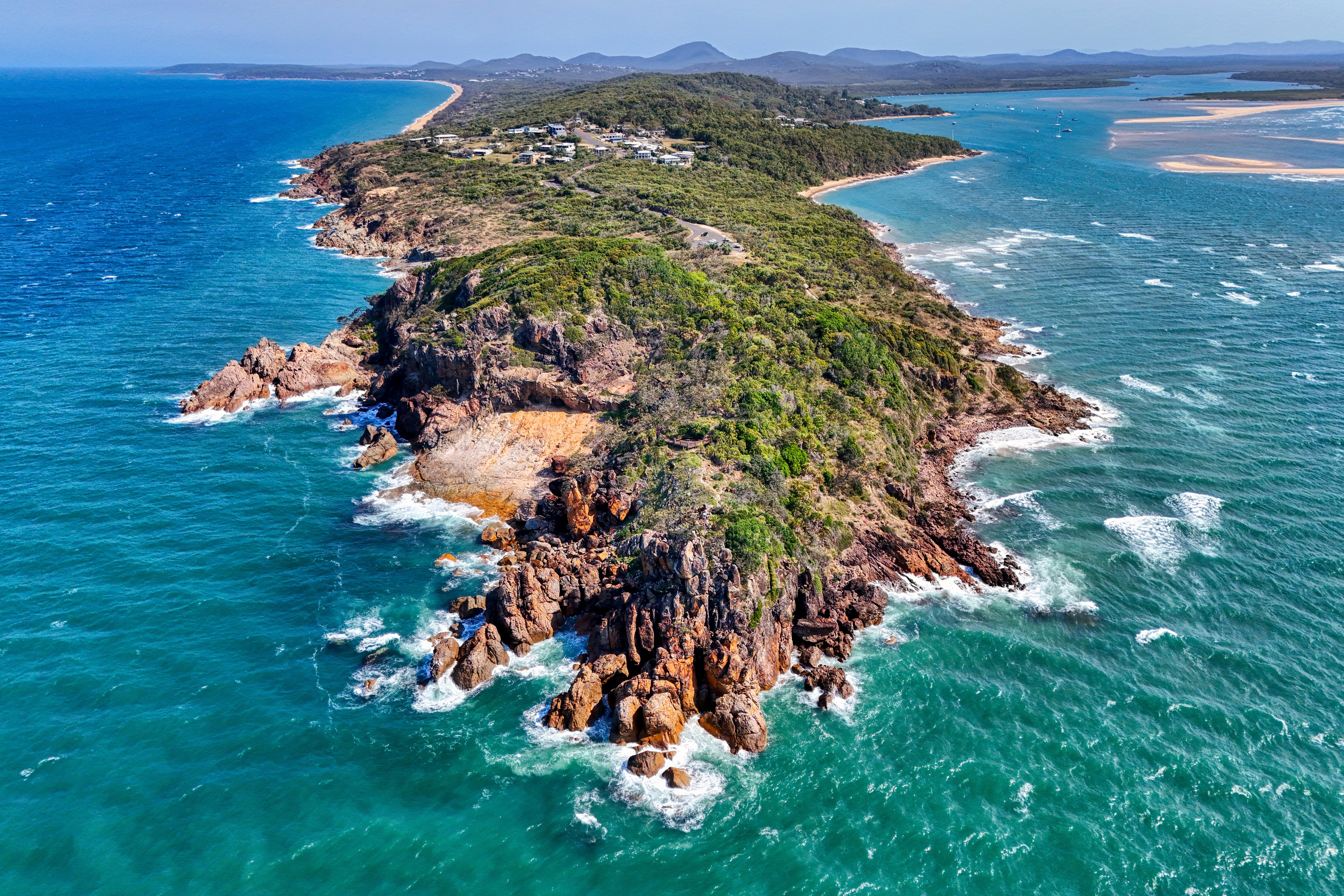
- Seventeen Seventy and its surroundings

- Interactive map of Seventeen Seventy
- Coordinates: 24.1633°S 151.8852°E
- Country: Australia
- State: Queensland
- LGA: Gladstone Region
- Location: 10.2 km (6.3 mi) N of Agnes Water; 62.9 km (39.1 mi) NE of Miriam Vale; 129 km (80 mi) NNW of Bundaberg; 131 km (81 mi) SE of Gladstone; 495 km (308 mi) NNW of Brisbane

Government
  - State electorate: Burnett
  - Federal division: Hinkler

Area
  - Total: 27.4 km^{2} (10.6 sq mi)

Population
  - Total: 125 (2021 census)
  - Density: 4.562/km^{2} (11.82/sq mi)
- Time zone: UTC+10:00 (AEST)
- Postcode: 4677
- Mean max temp: 25.6 °C (78.1 °F)
- Mean min temp: 18.8 °C (65.8 °F)
- Annual rainfall: 1,137.7 mm (44.79 in)
Localities around Seventeen Seventy
Coral Sea	Coral Sea	Coral Sea
Eurimbula	Seventeen Seventy	Coral Sea
Eurimbula	Agnes Water	Coral Sea

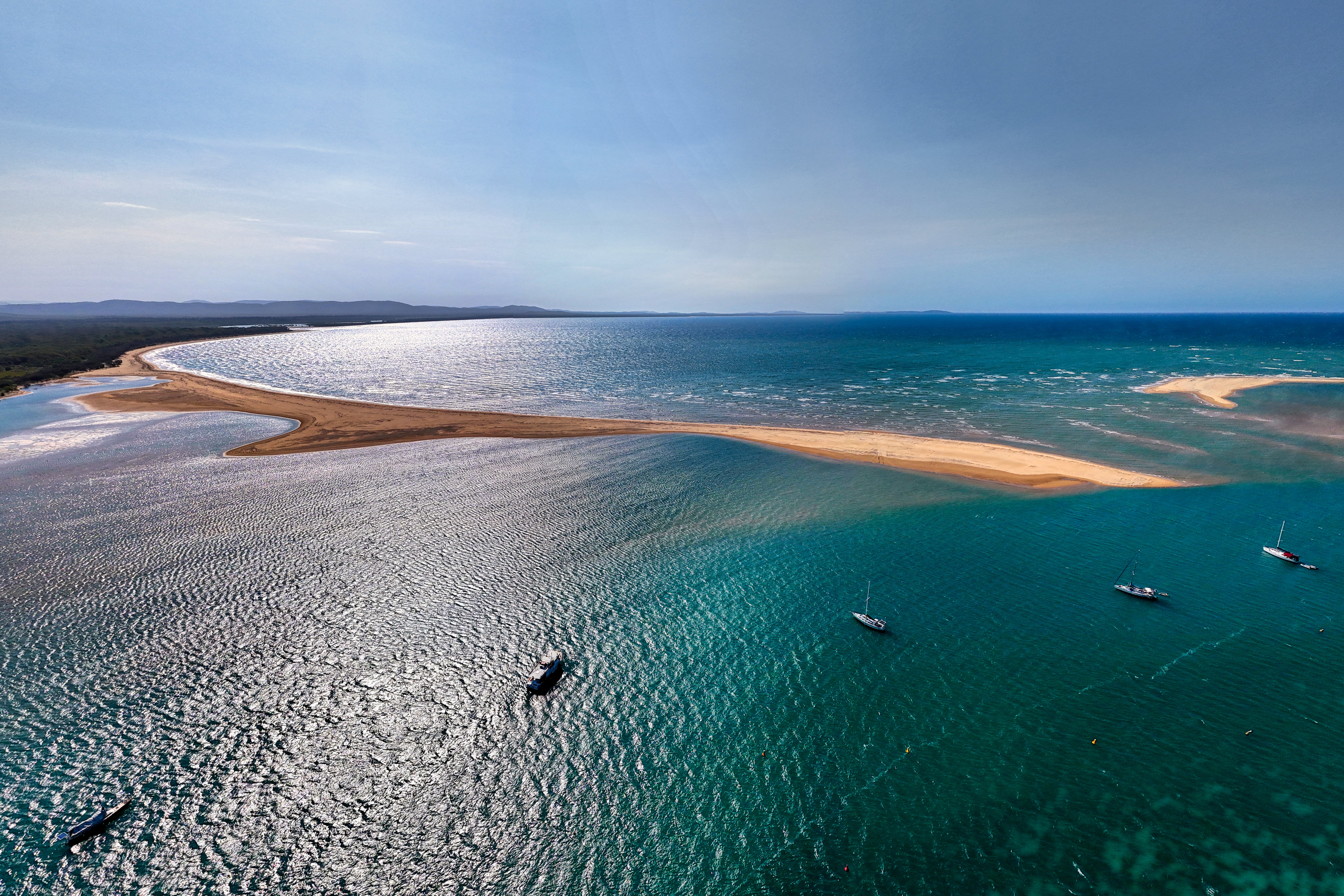
View out to the bay from Seventeen Seventy, November 2024

Seventeen Seventy, sometimes written 1770 or Town of 1770, is a coastal town and locality in the Gladstone Region, Queensland, Australia and 90 minutes north of Bundaberg on the Discovery Coast. The Town of 1770 is the closest access point to the Great Barrier Reef. In the 2021 census, the locality of Seventeen Seventy had a population of 125.

The town is built on the site of the second landing in Australia by James Cook and the crew of the bark HMS Endeavour in May 1770 (and their first landing in what is now the state of Queensland).

== Official name ==
Although the town is referred to locally as 1770 using numerals, the official name of the town is in words Seventeen Seventy, as per Queensland's place naming convention that numbers are spelled out.

== History ==
The town is built on the site of the second landing in Australia by James Cook and the crew of HMS Endeavour (and their first landing in what is now the state of Queensland) on 23 May 1770. Originally known as Round Hill – after the creek it sits on – the name was changed on 24 June 1936 after the town allotments were surveyed in 1935 to recognise the historical importance of the town.

A re-enactment of Cook’s historic landing was first held in 1970 as part of the bicentennial celebrations and is now held each year as part of the 1770 Festival in May.

== Heritage listings ==
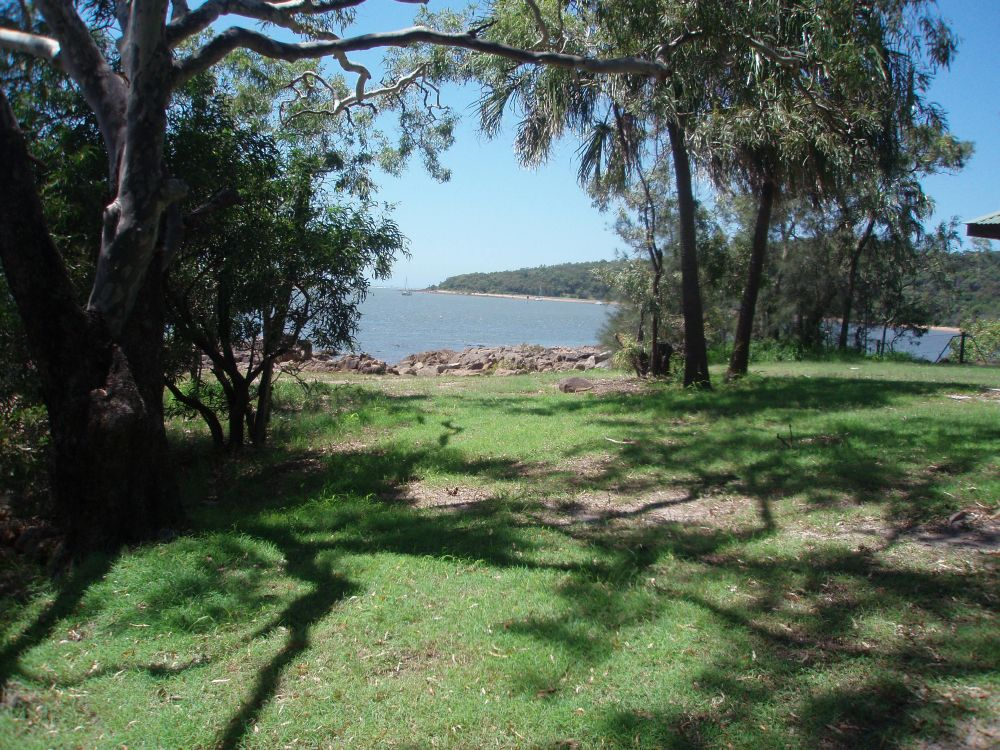
Cook's landing place

Seventeen Seventy has a number of heritage-listed sites, including:

- Cook's Landing Place, Round Hill Creek and Round Hill Head

== Demographics ==
In the 2011 census, the town of Seventeen Seventy had a population of 76.

In the 2016 census, the locality of Seventeen Seventy had a population of 69.

In the 2021 census, the locality of Seventeen Seventy had a population of 125.

== Amenities ==
There is a boat ramp with pontoon on Captain Cook Drive at Round Hill Creek (24.1713°S 151.8831°E). It is managed by the Gladstone Regional Council.

There is a heliport on Captain Cook Drive (24.1826°S 151.8826°E). It is adjacent to the Agnes Water/1770 SES Facility (24.1837°S 151.8829°E).

== Attractions ==
There are two lookouts on the northern tip of the peninsula:

- Joseph Banks Lower Lookout (24.1513°S 151.8866°E).
- Joseph Banks Top Lookout (24.1490°S 151.8858°E).

== Geography ==
The town is situated on a peninsula, with the Coral Sea and Bustard Bay on three sides.

Seventeen Seventy can be reached by a sealed road from Bundaberg, 120 kilometres (75 mi) to the south, going through Agnes Water (immediately to the south). The town sustains a small permanent population; a significant holiday population makes it to the area to take advantage of fishing, Great Barrier Reef trips and other water activities.

The northern tip of the peninsula is mostly with the protected area of Joseph Banks (Round Hill Head) Conservation Park (24.1600°S 151.8883°E).

Seventeen Seventy has the following headlands:

- Monument Point (24.1597°S 151.8828°E)
- Round Hill Head (24.1503°S 151.8864°E)

Monument Point is named because of the monument erected there to commemorate the landing by James Cook on 23 May 1770.

Offshore from Seventeen Seventy is:

- Bustard Bay (24.1061°S 151.8189°E)
- the Fairfax Islands group (23.8582°S 152.3735°E)
- the Hoskyn Islands group (23.8046°S 152.2948°E)
- the Bunker Group of islands (23.8486°S 152.3482°E)
- Capricorn Channel (22.9649°S 152.4734°E)
- Curtis Channel (24.0020°S 152.0851°E)

== Education ==
There are no schools in Seventeen Seventy. The nearest government primary school is Agnes Water State School in neighbouring Agnes Water to the south. The nearest government secondary school is Miriam Vale State School (to Year 10) in Miriam Vale to the south-west. There are no nearby schools providing secondary education to Year 12; the alternative are distance education and boarding school.

== Transport ==
In October 2002, Greyhound Australia coach services from Brisbane began calling at 1770, followed in November 2003 by Premier Motor Service.

== Climate ==
Seventeen Seventy has a tropical savannah climate (Aw) with warm, wet summers and relatively dry, sunny winters. The town has 95.6 clear days annually.

Climate data for Seventeen Seventy
Month	Jan	Feb	Mar	Apr	May	Jun	Jul	Aug	Sep	Oct	Nov	Dec	Year
Record high °C (°F)	34.5 (94.1)	34.5 (94.1)	34.0 (93.2)	31.9 (89.4)	28.6 (83.5)	27.4 (81.3)	26.9 (80.4)	28.4 (83.1)	30.7 (87.3)	30.3 (86.5)	33.7 (92.7)	33.5 (92.3)	34.5 (94.1)
Mean daily maximum °C (°F)	29.5 (85.1)	29.4 (84.9)	28.4 (83.1)	26.5 (79.7)	24.1 (75.4)	22.1 (71.8)	21.4 (70.5)	22.3 (72.1)	24.3 (75.7)	26.1 (79.0)	27.6 (81.7)	28.9 (84.0)	25.9 (78.6)
Mean daily minimum °C (°F)	23.0 (73.4)	22.7 (72.9)	21.7 (71.1)	19.5 (67.1)	16.9 (62.4)	14.7 (58.5)	13.9 (57.0)	14.7 (58.5)	17.2 (63.0)	19.2 (66.6)	21.0 (69.8)	22.3 (72.1)	18.9 (66.0)
Record low °C (°F)	17.3 (63.1)	16.1 (61.0)	14.9 (58.8)	11.0 (51.8)	8.3 (46.9)	6.8 (44.2)	7.4 (45.3)	6.7 (44.1)	9.4 (48.9)	11.5 (52.7)	13.4 (56.1)	11.5 (52.7)	6.7 (44.1)
Average precipitation mm (inches)	150.9 (5.94)	181.0 (7.13)	140.3 (5.52)	103.8 (4.09)	103.0 (4.06)	60.0 (2.36)	46.8 (1.84)	39.5 (1.56)	35.3 (1.39)	65.3 (2.57)	72.1 (2.84)	127.4 (5.02)	1,122 (44.17)
Average precipitation days (≥ 1.0 mm)	10.2	10.9	10.4	8.4	7.0	5.6	4.4	3.6	3.8	5.5	6.3	8.6	84.7
Average afternoon relative humidity (%)	72	73	71	70	70	68	66	67	69	69	69	71	70
Average dew point °C (°F)	22.5 (72.5)	22.6 (72.7)	21.3 (70.3)	19.3 (66.7)	16.9 (62.4)	14.3 (57.7)	13.1 (55.6)	14.0 (57.2)	16.5 (61.7)	18.2 (64.8)	19.6 (67.3)	21.4 (70.5)	18.3 (64.9)
Source: Bureau of Meteorology

== See also ==
- List of places with numeric names
