= Mount Mitchell (Queensland) =

Mountain in Queensland, Australia

- Cooyinnirra
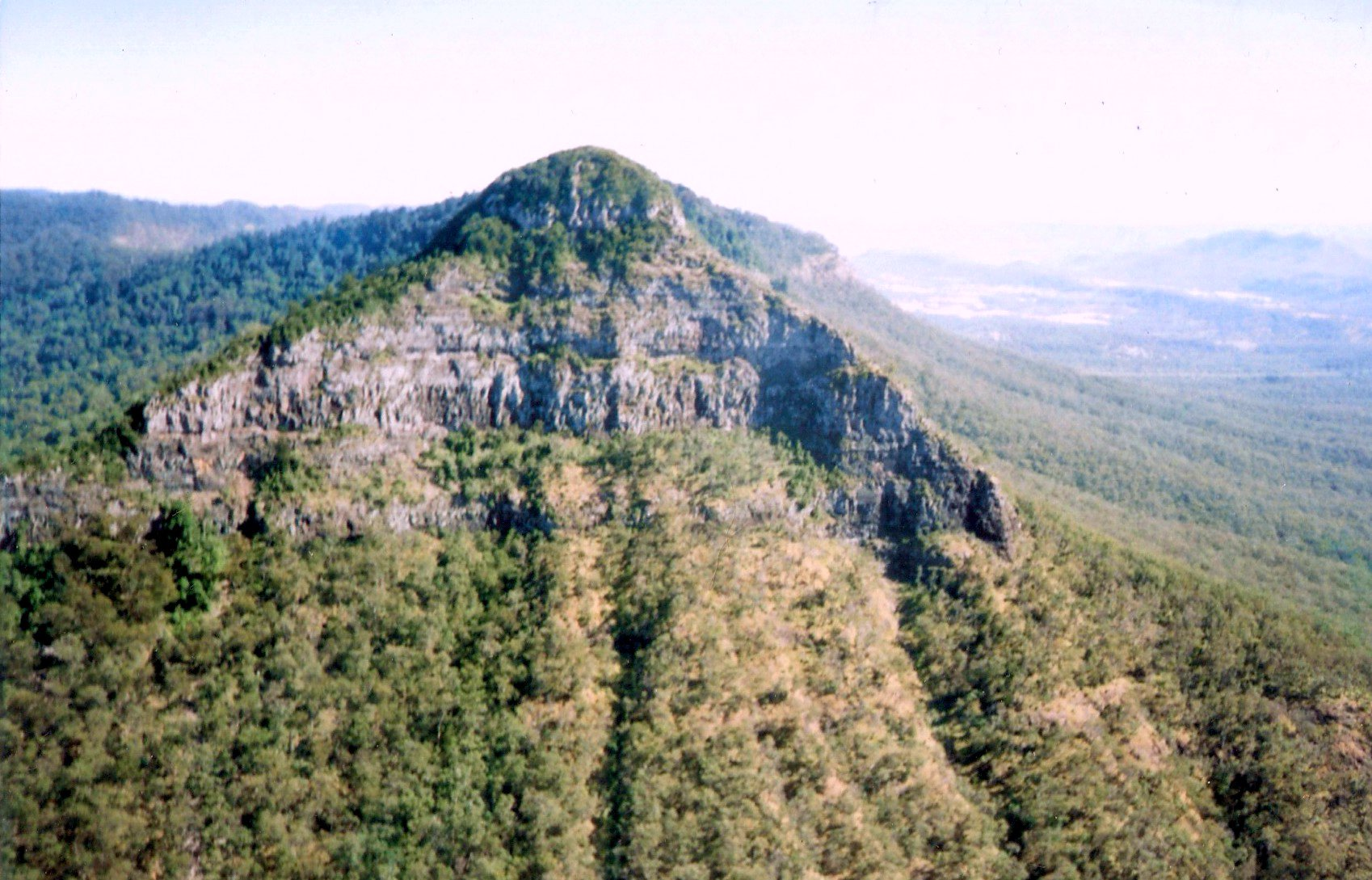
- The eastern slopes of Mount Mitchell

Highest point
- Elevation: 1,168 m (3,832 ft)
- Coordinates: 28°03′59″S 152°24′00″E

Geography
- Location within Queensland
- Location: Queensland, Australia
- Parent range: Main Range

Geology
- Mountain type: Volcanic

Climbing
- Easiest route: Graded trail

Mount Mitchell (Aboriginal: Cooyinnirra), is a twin-peaked volcanic mountain with an elevation above sea level of 1,168 metres (3,832 ft), located in the Main Range, is about 100 kilometres (62 mi) west of Brisbane, Queensland, Australia and immediately south of Cunninghams Gap.

== Features and history ==
The peak to the south of the gap was named by Allan Cunningham in 1828 and today is part of the Main Range National Park. Cunningham named the mountain after the Surveyor-General, Thomas Mitchell.

To the north of Cunninghams Gap is Mount Cordeaux, while Spicers Peak is located a small distance to the south east.

A trail, classified as grade 4, winds 5.1 kilometres (3.2 mi) up to the main summit which offers some great views. From the peak on a clear day the tallest buildings in Brisbane can be seen, as can the D'Aguilar Range, Teviot Range, Fassifern Valley and many other parts of the Scenic Rim. At the top of mountain there are sheer cliff edges.

== Gallery ==
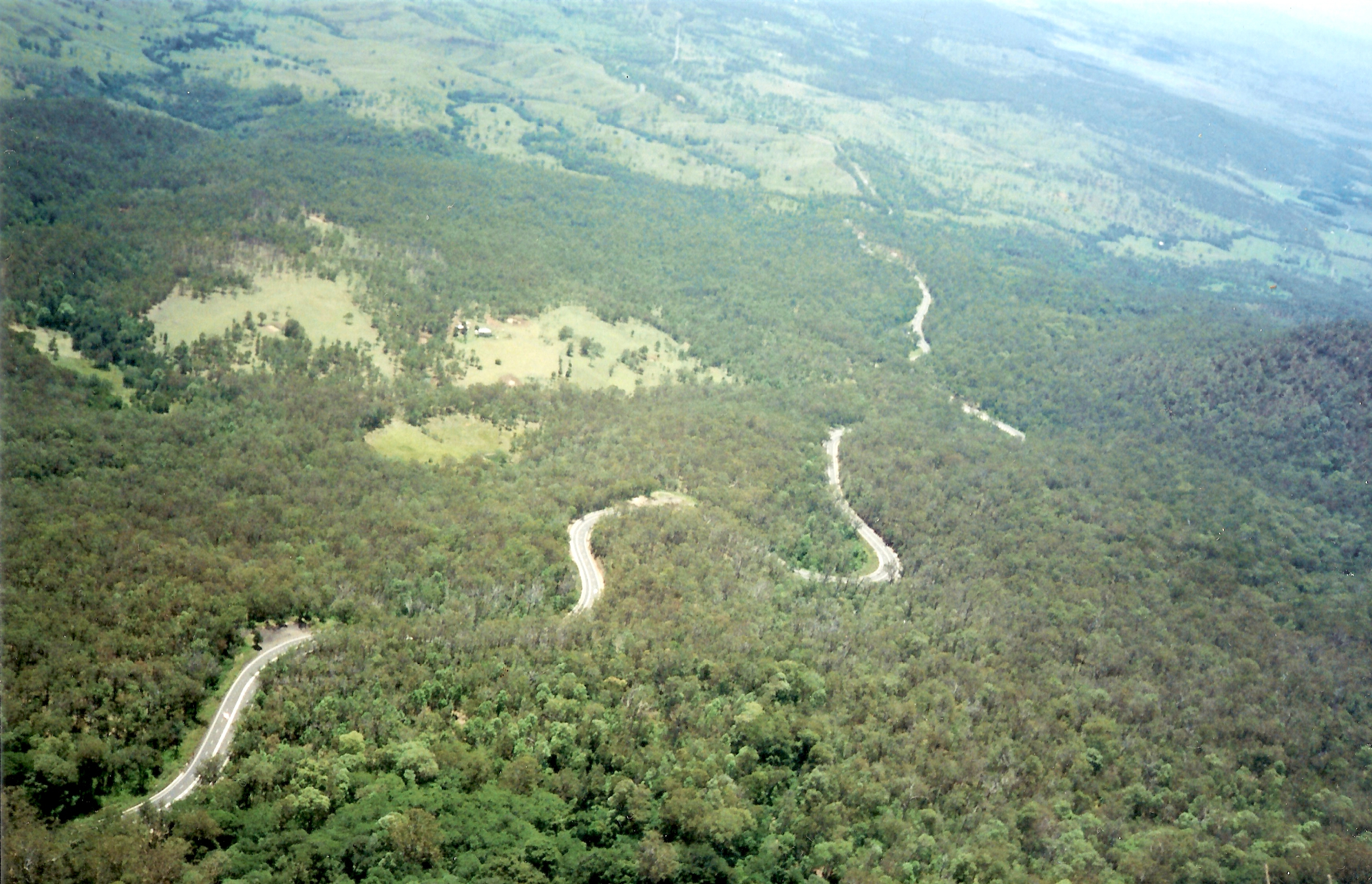
Cunningham Highway viewed from the top of Mount Mitchell.

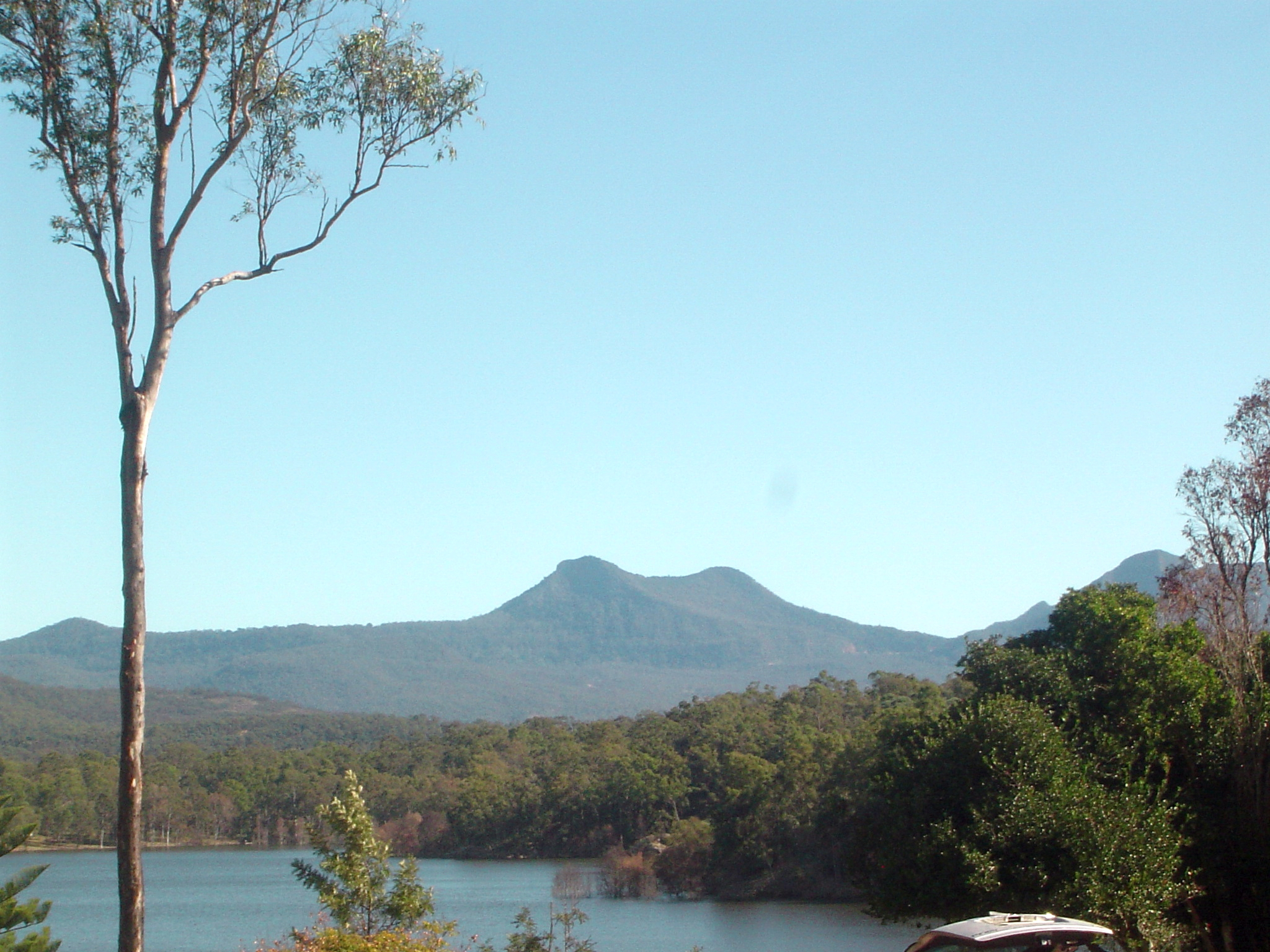
View from Lake Moogerah, 2011.

== See also ==
- List of mountains of Australia
