= Cook's Landing Place, Town of Seventeen Seventy =

Captain Cook's Landing Place, Town of Seventeen Seventy
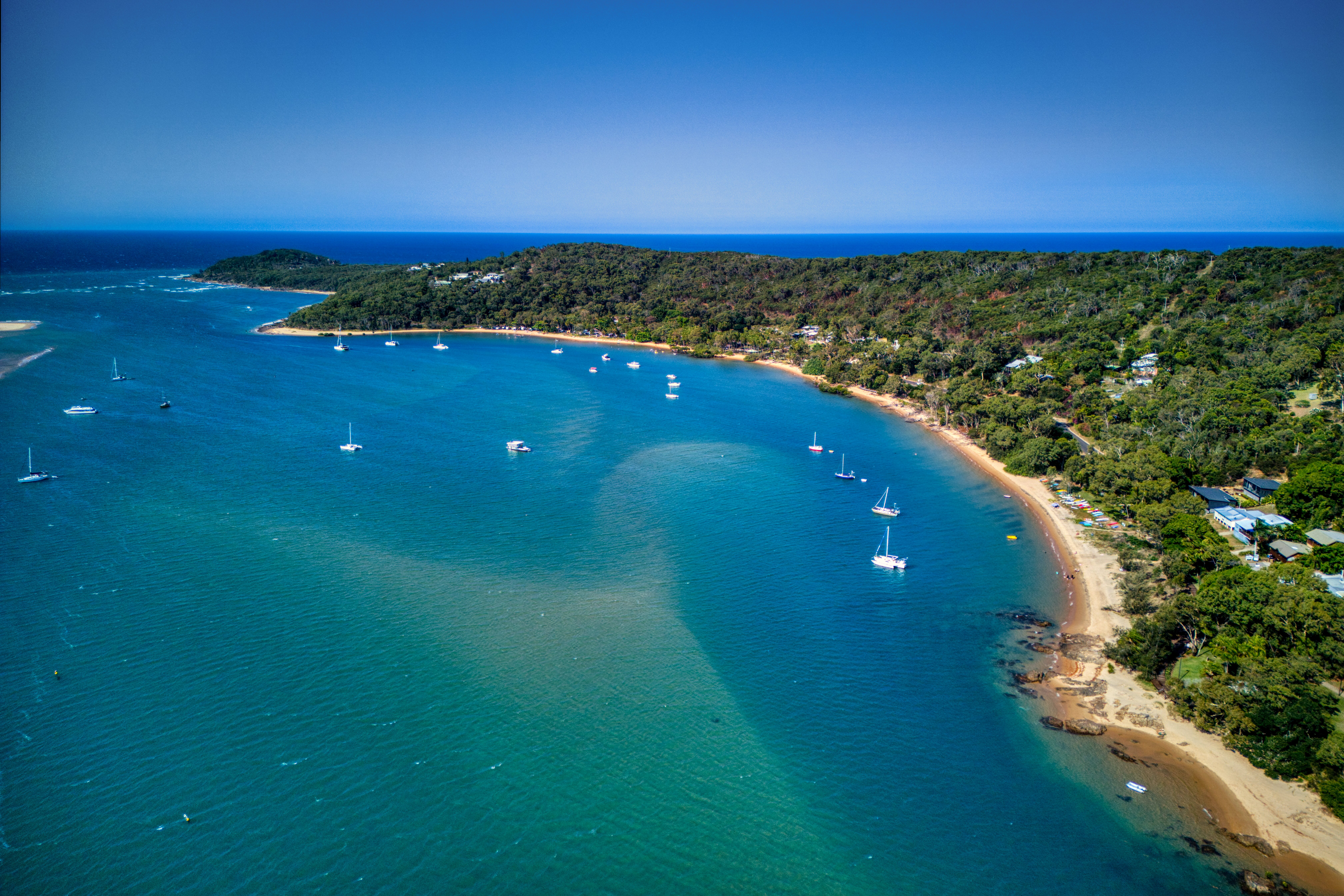
- Cook’s Landing Beach, Seventeen Seventy, Queensland

- Location within Queensland Location within Australia
- 24.161°S 151.8865°E
- Location: Seventeen Seventy, Gladstone Region, Queensland, Australia

History
- Design period: pre 1824 (pre-convict settlement)
- Built: 24 May 1770 – 24 May 1770

Queensland Heritage Register
- Official name: Cook's Landing Place, Town of Seventeen Seventy
- Type: state heritage (landscape)
- Designated: 27 March 1996
- Reference no.: 601614
- Significant period: 1770 (historical)
- Significant components: natural landscape, memorial – cairn

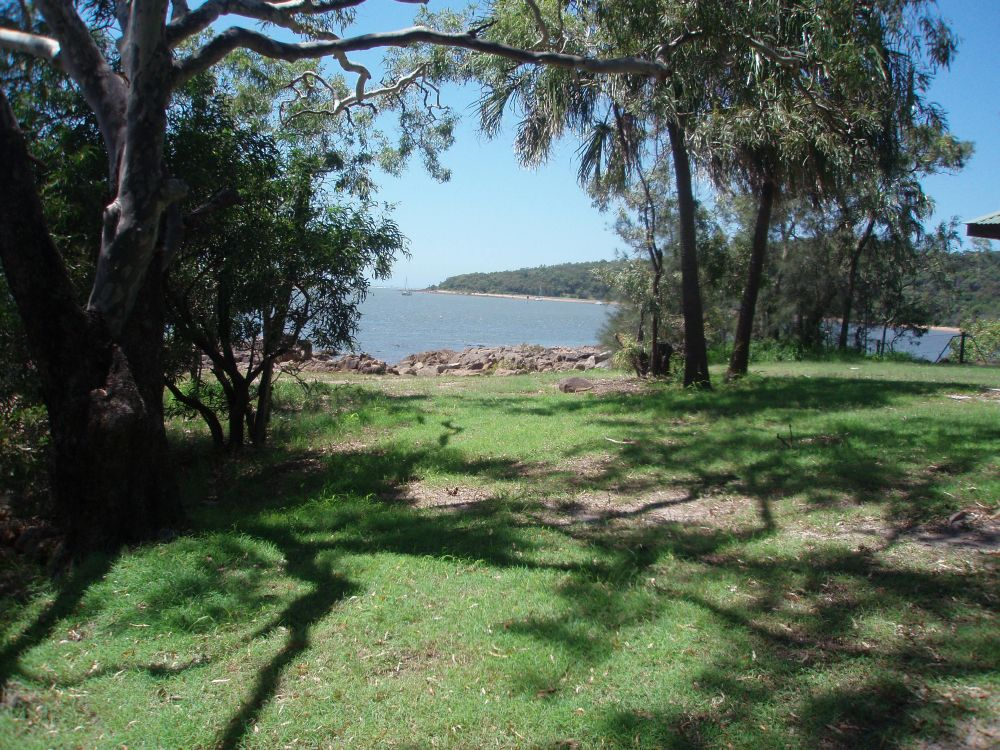
Site of Cook's landing of 1770, pictured in 2008

Cook's Landing Place is a heritage-listed site at Seventeen Seventy, Gladstone Region, Queensland, Australia. It is named after British explorer Lieutenant James Cook who landed there on 24 May 1770. It was added to the Queensland Heritage Register on 27 March 1996.

== History ==
The town of Seventeen Seventy is so named because on 24 May in that year, Lieutenant James Cook, captain of His Majesty's barque HMS Endeavour, came ashore and landed on the beach of Round Hill Creek in the vicinity of the present village.

In the morning of Thursday May 1770, the Lieutenant in his pinnace (with Mr Joseph Banks and Dr Daniel Solander) and Second Lieutenant John Gore in the yawl left the ship for the shore and made their first landing in what is now Queensland and their second landing in Australia. Cook made eleven landings on the eastern seaboard and ten of these were in Queensland. Cook's landing spot at Bustard Bay was in the vicinity of the present caravan park (developed in 1978), where a stream at the southern end enters the beach just north of the remaining mangroves.

Cook described the countryside as "visibly worse" than at Botany Bay, with dry and sandy soils, woods free of undergrowth, the same sort of numerous "birch" tree (coastal ironbark), mangroves skirting the lagoon and palm trees on low, barren, sandy places. He also noted bustards, black and white ducks, small oysters and other shell fish - mussels, pearl oysters and cockles.

Botanist Joseph Banks, who accompanied Cook on his "little excursion in to the woods", noted the great variety of plants even though the plant cover was not thick. He recognised plants already seen in the Tropics, and described many birds on shore including one species of Bustard. Some of the 55 specimens collected in the general area were illustrated and described in Banks' Florilegium, which was printed from copperplates under Banks' direction from Parkinson's unfinished sketches. (Parkinson died of dysentery on the voyage home.) As the woods behind Round Hill Head and adjacent to Round Hill Creek are the locality of the first botanical type-specimens collected in Queensland, they are of great scientific value. This was recognised in 1989 with the gazettal of Joseph Banks Environmental Park.

In August 1802 Matthew Flinders in HMS Investigator, accompanied by the Lady Nelson under the command of Lt John Murray, resurveyed Hervey's Bay. They reached the south head of Bustard Bay (Round Hill Head) on 2 August and anchored in nearly the same spot where the Endeavour had lain in 1770.

Subsequent early mariners visited Bustard Bay and noted the prominent landmark of Round Hill from Round Hill Head: Captain Phillip King in the Mermaid in 1819, Captain Stokes in HMS Beagle in 1839 and 1841, and Colonel Barney in the steamer Cornubia in 1846, when he was looking for a site for northern settlement.

Port Curtis was proclaimed a district in January 1854. Most European settlement by-passed Bustard Bay and Round Hill Head, but pastoral runs were taken up in the hinterland. In 1867 a lighthouse was erected at Bustard Head because of increased coastal shipping, and a sawmill was established at Eurimbula Creek. By 1894, Agnes Water beach was a popular weekend resort for sawmill employees. There was a timber shoot down Round Hill and pine logs were hauled by teamsters to the rafting grounds on Oyster Creek and Round Hill Creek. The first cottage at Round Hill was erected in 1915.

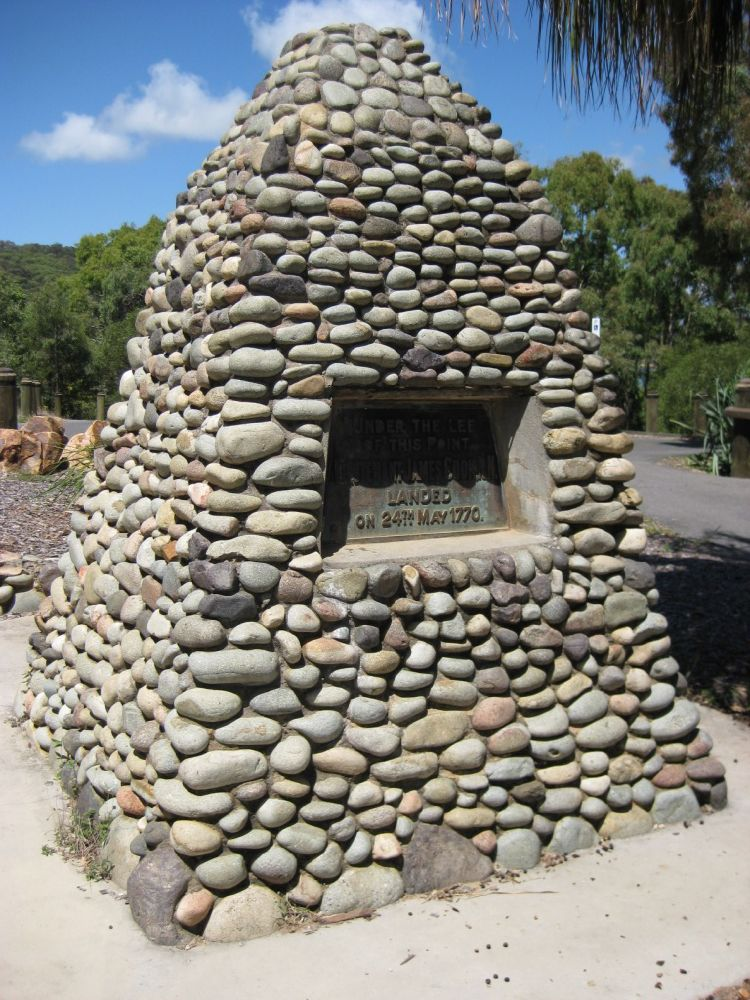
Monument marking Captain Cook's Landing Place, 2009

In July 1925, the Royal Geographical Society of Queensland resolved to erect a monument at Bustard Bay to commemorate the first landing of the British on the Queensland coast. With the support of the Governor of Queensland, Sir Matthew Nathan, a public appeal for funds was launched on 1 September 1925, and proved so popular that a cairn was ordered the following month. This was erected early in 1926, on the point of land overlooking Bustard Bay to the north. In response to a request from the RGSQ for the reservation of an area of land surrounding the Cook Memorial, the Department of Public Lands set aside an area of 1,790 acres (720 ha) as a Recreation Reserve under the control of the Miriam Vale Shire as trustee, February 1927. This did not include the site of the actual landing in Bustard Bay.

An area was surveyed adjacent to Round Hill Creek for the site of a township in the mid-1930s. It was named Seventeen Seventy, re-emphasising that this was Cook's first landing place in Queensland in May 1770.

The significance of Round Hill Head, at the time considered the birthplace of Queensland, drew the attention of those planning the 1970 Bi-Centenary Celebrations. The Queensland Government made available $2,000 for a monument additional to the cairn, to be erected and maintained by the Department of Local Government. The site selected for the new monument was about a mile nearer the tip of Round Hill Head on the western or inshore side, overlooking the spot where the Endeavour had lain.

The new monument was not to imitate the existing cairn as simply a marker for the site of Cook's landing, but was intended to symbolise that in landing at this place, the British first opened the door of opportunity in Queensland. A four-sided concrete portico in classical style was erected, with the words Doorway to Destiny on the top-piece. In 1975, the area surrounding the monument was gazetted as the Captain Cook Memorial and Park Reserve. The monument later developed concrete cancer, and was demolished in August 1994.

In 1989 the Joseph Banks Environmental Park (now Joseph Banks Conservation Park) was gazetted. It covered about 114 hectares (280 acres), but did not include Cook's actual landing site.

== Description ==
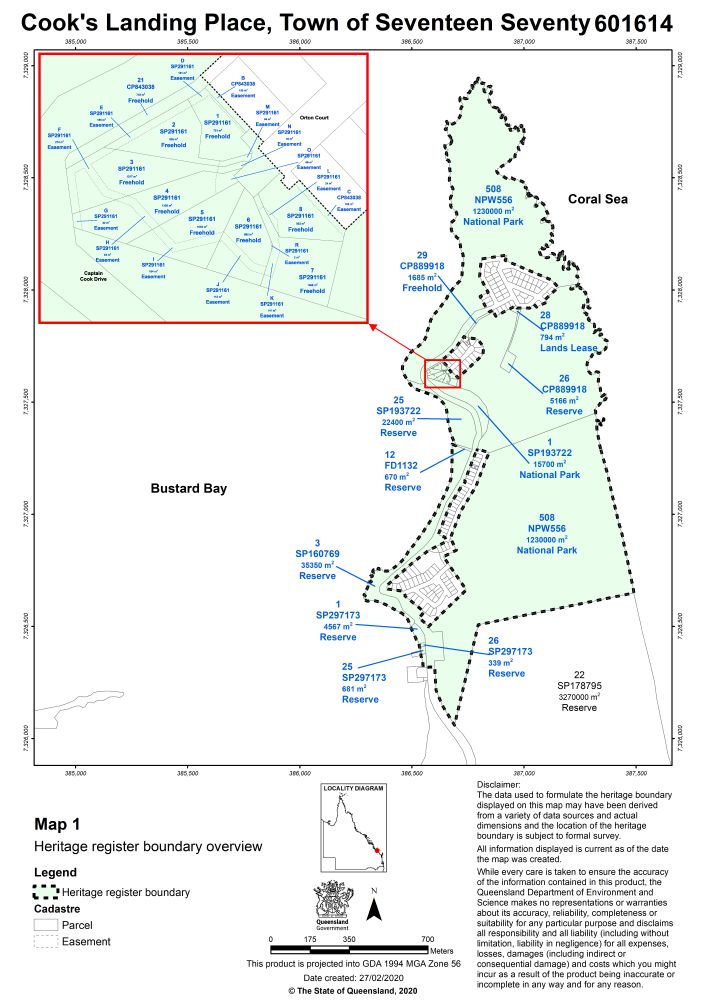

Round Hill Head is a distinctive granite landform at 54 metres (177 ft) above sea level, a landmark for mariners as the north west extreme of Hervey Bay and the bluff termination of hills, well covered with wood and grass, sloping down around Round Hill, which is 289 metres (948 ft) high 12 kilometres (7.5 mi) due south. The headland has naturally grassy areas running from the ocean on the east to the sheltered creek on the west and this swathe has been referred to as "Mrs Cook's Drive" since the turn of the century.

Round Hill Creek on the western side of the headland has a very narrow channel, which has maintained its depth at soundings taken since 1770, but is encumbered with shifting sandbanks. The sandy beach is fringed by mangroves and backed by cotton woods, paperbark and palms in the wetter gullies, with ironbark on the drier slopes.

From Monument Point extensive views may be obtained of the picturesque inlet with boats at anchor, wisps of smoke from the cottages screened in the bush, distant blue mountains and across the sand spits to the west the dense lowland vegetation of Eurimbula National Park with the jagged Munro Range towering in the distance. At night the Bustard Head lighthouse flashes its warning presence across Bustard Bay.

When viewed extensively, European occupation of the land has not altered the landscape irretrievably. Very few of the recent houses intrude into the landscape, mature trees have been retained, and the bush has regenerated on the lower slopes.

Very few clumps of mangroves remain in the lower reaches of Round Hill Creek along the western margin but the caravan park developed in 1978 has a cover of mature native trees while the unreserved Crown land along the foreshore adjacent to Captain Cook Drive has an impressive covering of mature tall Cabbage palms, probably predating Cook's landing.

The spring which fed a streamlet rising on the slope above Captain Cook Drive and running out on the beach only stopped flowing in 1992. It had yielded a bucket of water every 25 seconds at peak flow in 1989. This was probably the stream mentioned by Cook. The nearby area of houses and the 95 site caravan park is now sewered to prevent ground water contamination.

The road reserve retains its vegetation and the picnic area opposite the shop is shaded and attractive. Murgard's marina and the public boat ramp in the "lagoon" of the upper reaches of the creek are not intrusive but the approach to the township is messy, despite driving through tall forest along the base of the ridge immediately before entering Seventeen Seventy. The upper reaches of Round Hill Creek are meandering, shallow, mangrove fringed, and backed by tall paperbark forest.

== Heritage listing ==
Cook's Landing Place was listed on the Queensland Heritage Register on 27 March 1996.
