= Assembly Hall, Warwick =

Heritage-listed community hall

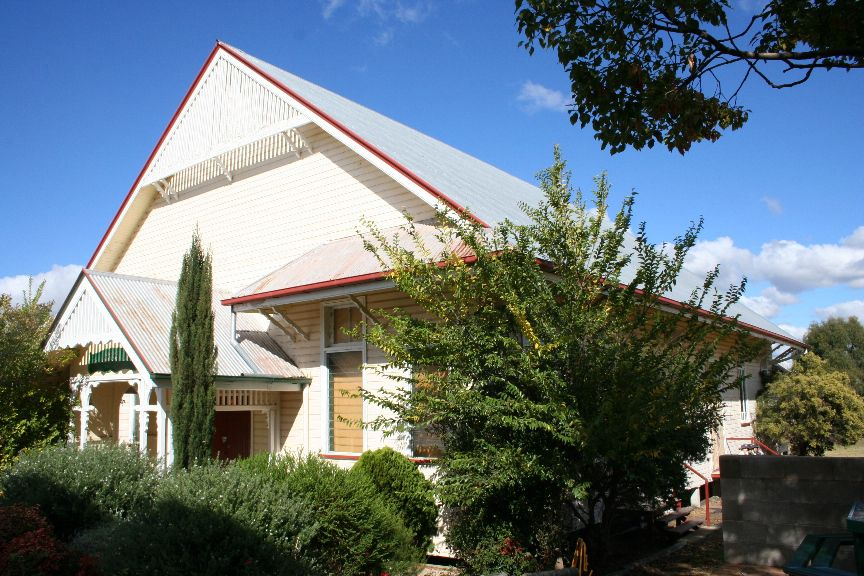
- Assembly Hall, 2008

- Location within Queensland Location within Australia
- 28.226°S 152.0278°E
- Location: 8 Locke Street, Warwick, Southern Downs Region, Queensland, Australia

Queensland Heritage Register
- Official name: Assembly Hall
- Type: state heritage (built)
- Designated: 21 August 1992
- Reference no.: 600954
- Significant period: 1917–1987

Assembly Hall is a heritage-listed community hall at 8 Locke Street, Warwick, Southern Downs Region, Queensland, Australia. It was added to the Queensland Heritage Register on 21 August 1992, but its heritage listing is currently under review.
