= Mount Cordeaux =

Mountain in Queensland, Australia

- Niamboyoo
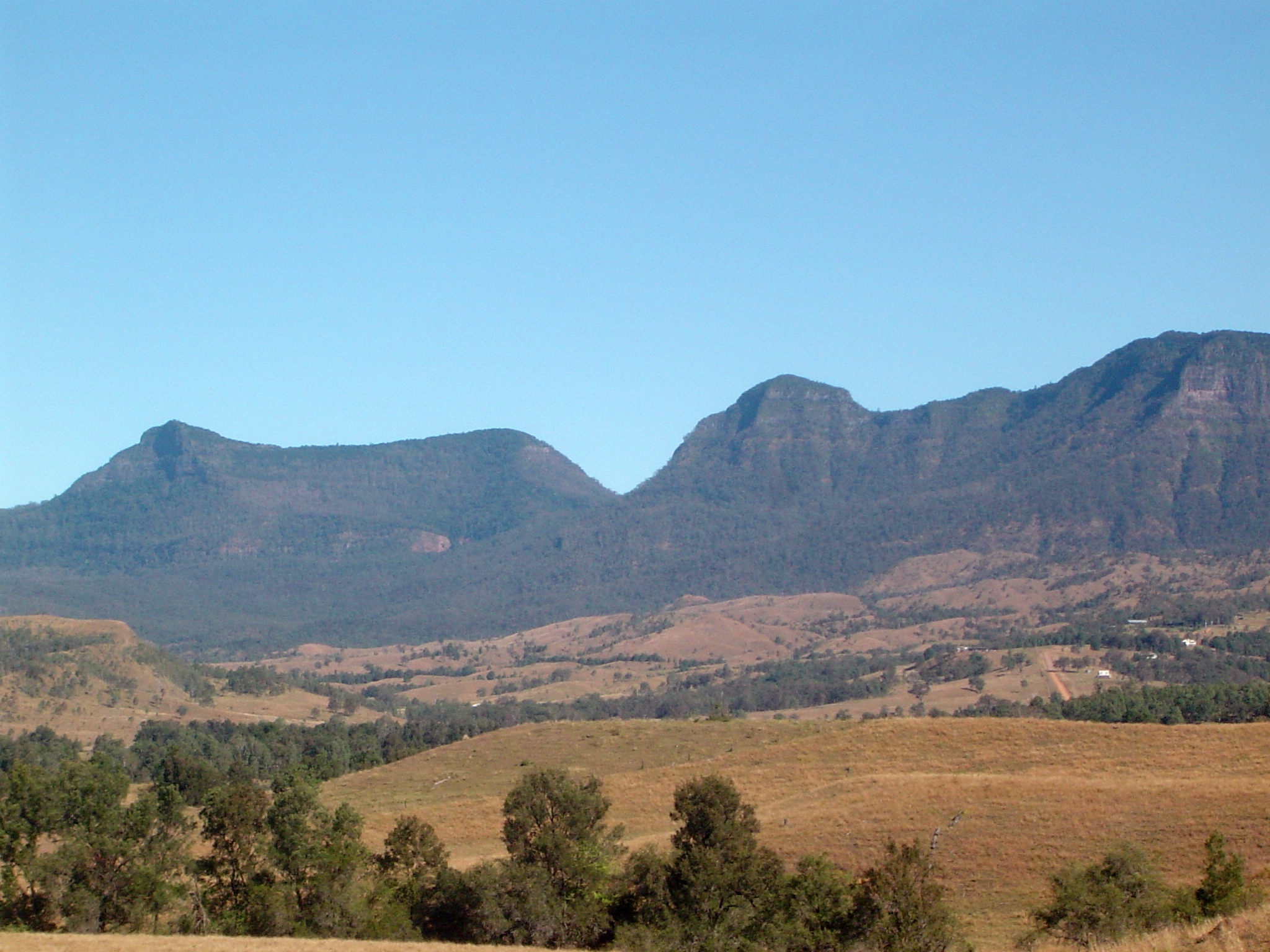
- Mount Cordeaux is to the right of gap in the range

Highest point
- Elevation: 1,135 m (3,724 ft)
- Coordinates: 28°03′00″S 152°24′00″E

Geography
- Location within Queensland
- Location: Queensland, Australia
- Parent range: Main Range National Park

Geology
- Mountain type: Volcanic

Climbing
- Easiest route: Walking track

Mount Cordeaux is a mountain near Brisbane, Australia and rises 1,135 m. It lies to the immediate north of Cunninghams Gap in the Main Range National Park. It is known to the Aboriginal People as Niamboyoo, however, the meaning is unknown. It appears that early usage on names for the mountain varied, as a 29 September 1897 report in the Warwick Examiner and Times, refers to "the well-known Cunningham's Gap, with its twin sentinel peaks, Coonyinirra and Niamboyoo".

In 1927, the mountain was considered 'unclimbable'. Now a series of graded trails leads to a lookout just below the summit, 'Bald Rock' look-out and camp, a Palm Gorge and the Gap Creek Water Fall. From the summit of Mt. Cordeaux other Scenic Rim peaks can be seen, as can the Fassifern Valley below and the Mistake Range to the north east. There are hazardous, sheer cliffs along the tracks.

The first European to discover and name the mountain was Allan Cunningham in 1828. It was named after William Cordeaux who was the assistant to Sir Thomas Mitchell, the Surveyor-General.

Vegetation on the lower parts is mostly rainforest. In higher areas montane heath and grasstrees are found. The giant rock lily grows well on the slopes of Mount Cordeaux. The forest is mostly devoid of large red cedar, hoop pine, carabeen, pigeonberry, tulip oak or purple laurel, as Timber-getters in the early 1900s had harvested most of the area of Cunninghams Gap and Goomburra.

The first pioneers thought to have climbed to the peak of Mount Cordeaux are a party of five, on 29 December 1910. The party was composed of Mr. T.B. Roscoe of Brisbane, Mr. James H. Bell of Maryvale, and three of Mr. Bell's sons. To commemorate the successful climb "T.B.R.", "J.H.Bell", and the date was carved into the summits rock with a tomahawk. This history is disputed as Mr. M.T. O'Connor of Tallebudgera and W.M. Garland of Boonah were reported to have conquered the summit on 30 February 1910. They reported observing marks on trees indicating the use of ropes which led them to believe that the summit had already been climbed. However, an earlier report by the latter climber reports their climb to be December of that year.

== Gold Mining History ==
On the current path to ascend the summit of Mt. Cordeaux can be seen the remains of three mining attempts: a horizontal tunnel, a shaft, and an open cut trench. The latter two remains are presently fenced. On 20 February 1933, the lease holders of the mining operation applied for exemption from working conditions to construct a traffic-able road to the lease. At that time a 'considerable amount of work' had been conducted.

== See also ==
- List of mountains in Australia
- Mount Mitchell
