= Spicer =

Spicer may refer to:

== Places ==
- Spicer, Minnesota, small city in the United States
- 2065 Spicer, an asteroid
- New Spicer Meadow Reservoir
- Spicer's Gap, a mountain pass in Queensland, Australia
- Spicer Islands, group of islands in Nunavut, Canada
- Spicers Peak, mountain in Queensland, Australia

== Brands and enterprises ==
- James Spicer & Sons (since 1922 "Spicers Ltd."), wholesale paper and stationery manufacturer
- Spicer Manufacturing Company, manufacturer of transmissions and automotive components, which later became Dana Holding Corporation
    - Spicer joint, a universal joint created by Clarence W. Spicer

== Other uses ==
- Spicer Baronets
- The Collected Books of Jack Spicer
