= Tregony, Queensland =

Tregony
- Suburb
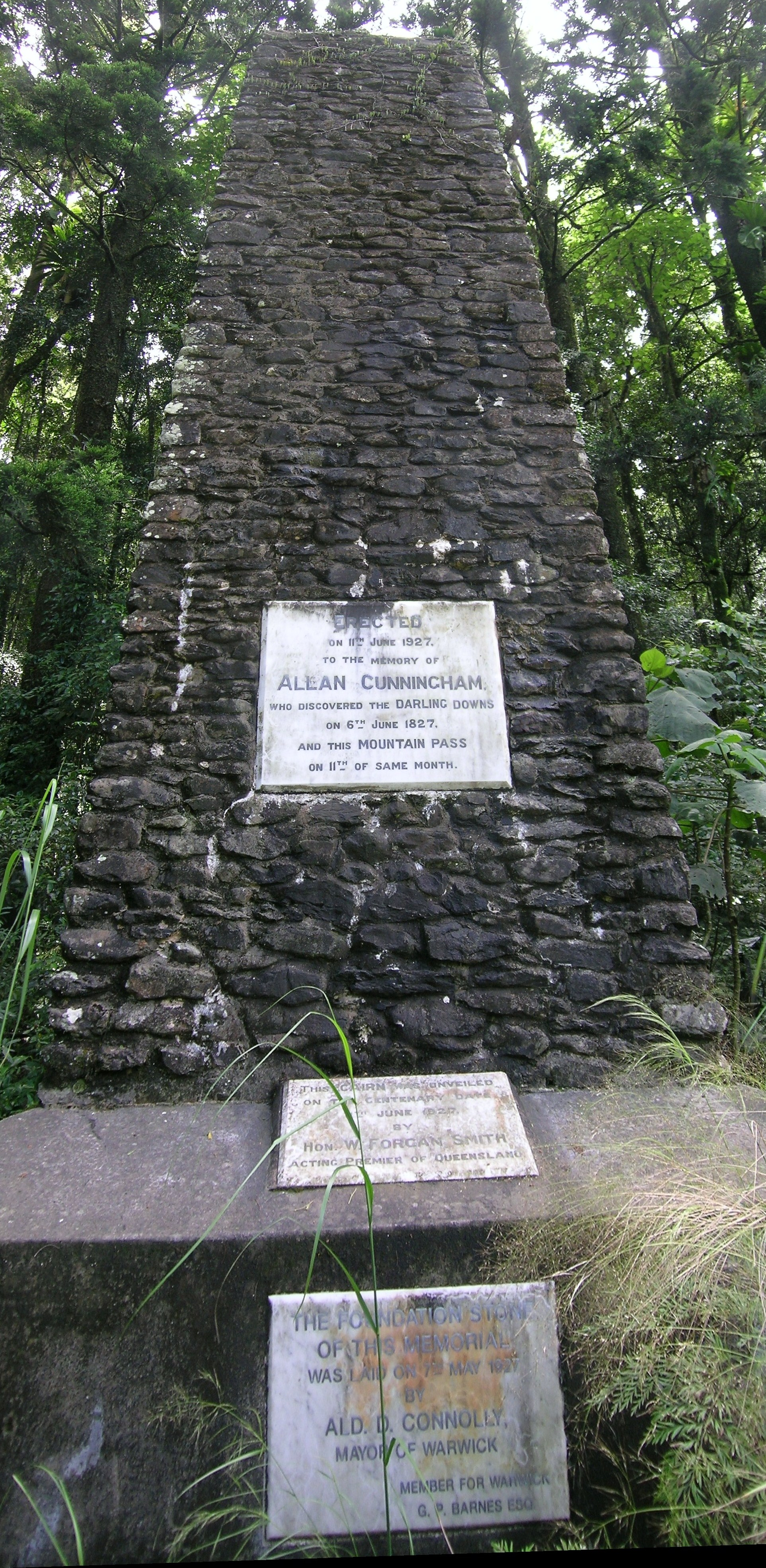
- Allan Cunningham monument, Cunningham's Gap, 2009

- Interactive map of Tregony
- Coordinates: 28.0511°S 152.3544°E
- Country: Australia
- State: Queensland
- LGA: Southern Downs Region
- Location: 35.9 km (22.3 mi) NE of Warwick; 82.5 km (51.3 mi) SW of Ipswich; 122 km (76 mi) SW of Brisbane

Government
  - State electorate: Southern Downs
  - Federal division: Maranoa

Area
  - Total: 57.6 km^{2} (22.2 sq mi)

Population
  - Total: 36 (2021 census)
  - Density: 0.625/km^{2} (1.619/sq mi)
- Time zone: UTC+10:00 (AEST)
- Postcode: 4370
Suburbs around Tregony
North Branch	North Branch	Tarome
Maryvale	Tregony	Clumber
Swanfels	Swanfels	Clumber

Tregony is a rural locality in the Southern Downs Region, Queensland, Australia. It is one of the major gateways to the Darling Downs from the Queensland coast. In the 2021 census, Tregony had a population of 36 people.

== Geography ==
The eastern part of Tregony is the Main Range National Park on the western slopes of the Great Dividing Range, rising to 1,160 metres (3,810 ft). From there Gap Creek rises and flows west, eventually becoming a tributary of Glengallan Creek, then the Condamine River and eventually the Murray-Darling River through New South Wales and South Australia.

The Cunningham Highway coming from Tarome to the east crosses the range at Cunningham's Gap (elevation 790 metres) on the eastern boundary of the locality and then runs from east to west through the locality running roughly parallel and south of Gap Creek falling to 590 metres (1,940 ft) elevation on the western boundary.

The land in centre and west of the locality is flatter and used for grazing on native vegetation with some crop growing.

== History ==
Although not called Tregony at that time, the area was of great interest to early explorers. The Darling Downs was seen as having great agricultural potential, but initial access to the area was via an overland route through inland New South Wales, which would create an unreasonable time and cost barrier for trade. A faster route was needed to the coast, preferably via the newly developing towns of Ipswich and Brisbane, which were linked by the Bremer and Brisbane Rivers to Moreton Bay and then by sea to other parts of Australia and overseas. However, the Great Dividing Range separated the Darling Downs from the coast. On 11 June 1827, Allan Cunningham approaching from the Darling Downs identified a possible dray route (later known as Spicer's Gap) across the range. On 21 August 1828, travelling from Ipswich, Cunningham found a second pass, now known as Cunningham's Gap, but he thought (wrongly) that it was the same pass as he had found in 1827, but Cunningham's Gap is about 4 kilometres (2.5 mi) north of Spicer's Gap. Cunningham reported to the New South Wales Government (at that time, Queensland was still part of New South Wales) that the route should be via Cunningham's Gap.

As the Darling Downs was being settled, finding a dray route across the range became increasingly important. The route via Cunningham's Gap was too steep for a dray, but it was not until April 1847, that Henry Alphen rediscovered Spicer's Gap. In August 1847, two dray successfully travelled via Spicer's Gap to Ipswich. This led to the establishment of Spicers Gap Road (modern spelling omits the apostrophe) over the range. In 1861, the telegraph line was built along Spicers Gap Road linked up the first telegraph station at Fassifern Reserve with the station at Tregony, on the Darling Downs side.

Spicers Gap Road required extensive expenditure on maintenance and with the 1871 opening of the Southern railway line from Warwick (the major town on the Darling Downs) to Toowoomba and then by the Main Line railway to Brisbane, Spicers Gap Road was virtually abandoned as rail transport was superior to drays.

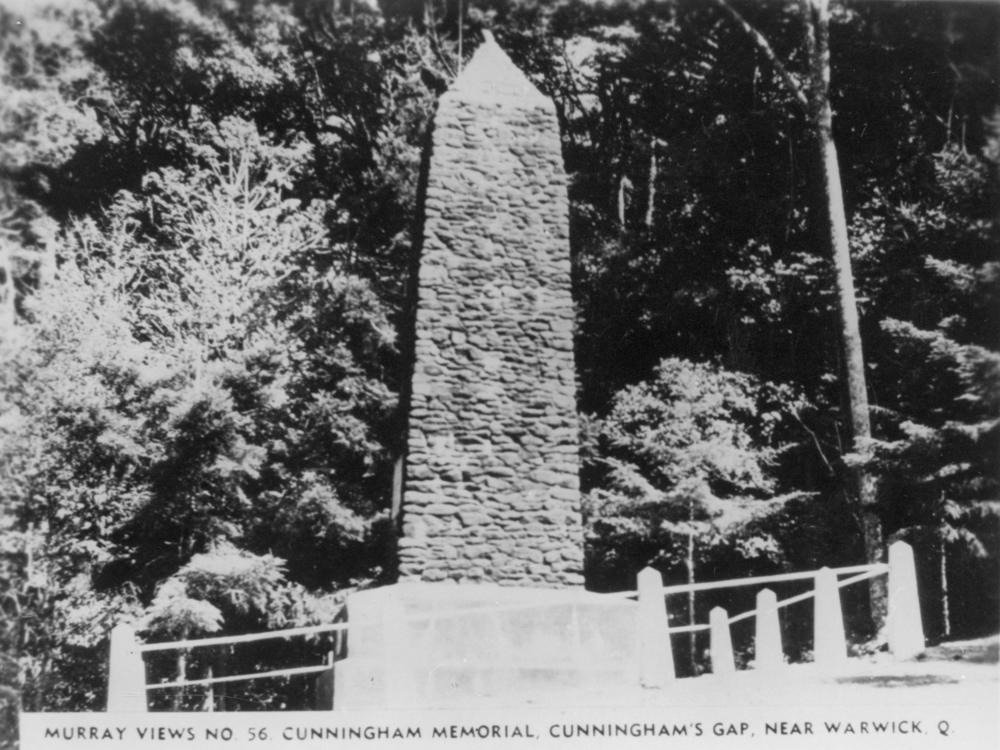
Allan Cunningham memorial, circa 1945

As automobiles started to become more widely available, it became realistic to create a road via Cunningham's Gap, which was built between 1925 and 1927. On 11 June 1927 (a century after Allan Cunningham discovered Spicer's Gap), the road was officially opened by the Acting Queensland Premier, William Forgan Smith, who also unveiled a monument to Cunningham. The plaque on the monument states that Cunningham found Cunningham's Gap in 1927 (perpetuating Cunningham's own confusion over the two gaps). In 1935, the road was upgraded to highway standard and was named the Cunningham Highway, and became the most direct route between Brisbane and Warwick.

== Demographics ==
In the 2016 census, Tregony had a population of 34 people.

In the 2021 census, Tregony had a population of 36 people.

== Heritage listings ==
Tregony has a number of heritage-listed sites, including:

- Spicers Gap Road, the former road across the Great Dividing Range prior to the development of the Cunningham Highway
- Allan Cunningham Monument: Cunningham Highway, Cunningham's Gap (28.0497°S 152.3946°E)

== Education ==
There are no schools In Tregony. The nearest government primary school is Maryvale State School in neighbouring Maryvale to the west. The nearest government secondary schools are Allora State School (to Year 10) in Allora to the west, Boonah State High School (to Year 12) in Boonah to the east, and Warwick State High School (to Year 12) in Warwick to the south-west.
