= Cambanoora Gorge =

Coordinates: 28.2963°S 152.3525°E

The Gorge runs between the source of the Condamine River and the town of Killarney in Queensland, Australia. It is not officially named and is also known as the Condamine Gorge and the 14 River Crossings. the area is officially known as "The Falls"

The gorge begins in the historical area of the head which is bordered by Wilsons Peak to the east and Mount Superbus to the north. Commencing at this broad grassland, the gorge narrows as the river encounters harder trachyte rock. This creates a dramatic landscape.

The road through the gorge was used to carry supplies and mail to early settlers along the length of the gorge, and to bring timber to the railway in Killarney. The Crossings are named First, Second, Double, Mawhirts, Bullocky, Flaggie, Rocky, Mill, Reis', Heywood's, Billy John's, Andrew Evan's, Long and Watson's Crossing in order from The Head down river.

The area is one of outstanding natural beauty in the Border ranges of southern Queensland. It is a rich bio-region with at least 14 endangered or threatened species ranging from the azure kingfisher to the spotted tail quoll and the glossy black cockatoo.

Condamine River Road runs through the Gorge and is a dirt road with a speed limit of 30 km/h (19 mph). The speed limit through the crossings is 5 km/h (3 mph). The gorge is not a national park or state forest, rather it is a farming and residential area. The road crosses the Condamine River 14 times and is dangerous during times of flooding, resulting in loss of property and life and hence is often closed.

The road through the gorge is bordered mostly by private property. Drivers should stick to the road and stop at designated stopping areas only including Bullocky Crossing. Proper driver behaviour is appreciated including slowing down for cows and wildlife on the road, leaving no rubbish, and not driving up the river (platypus there). Activities such as bushwalking, horse riding, bird watching, mountain bike riding, picnicking are encouraged. There is no camping in the gorge unless organised prior on private property.

Condamine River Road is section 6 of the National Trail.

More recently Condamine River road has been subjected to exploitation by 4WD tourism operators and clubs which has led to overtourism and damage to the sensative riparian environment that supports one of the last Murray Darling breeding populations of platypus and blackfish in South East Queensland. It has also resulted in escalating conflict between trespassing 4WD's, residents and the police.

== See also ==
- List of canyons
