= Mount Asplenium =

Mountain in Queensland, Australia

- Location within Queensland

Highest point
- Elevation: 1,294 m (4,245 ft)
- Listing: List of mountains in Australia
- Coordinates: 28°09′00″S 152°25′59″E

Geography
- Location: Queensland, Australia
- Parent range: Main Range

Mount Asplenium is a mountain in the Main Range of south-east Queensland, Australia. It is protected within the Main Range National Park. The summit can be reached by hiking south from Mount Huntley, however there is no marked trail so only experienced navigators should attempt the ascent. The summit is rocky and covered in rainforest vegetation, making camping unpleasant and blocking out views. Nearby Panorama point, to the south, offers better views and is suitable for camping for a small party.
