= Spicers Gap Road =

Historic road in Queensland, Australia

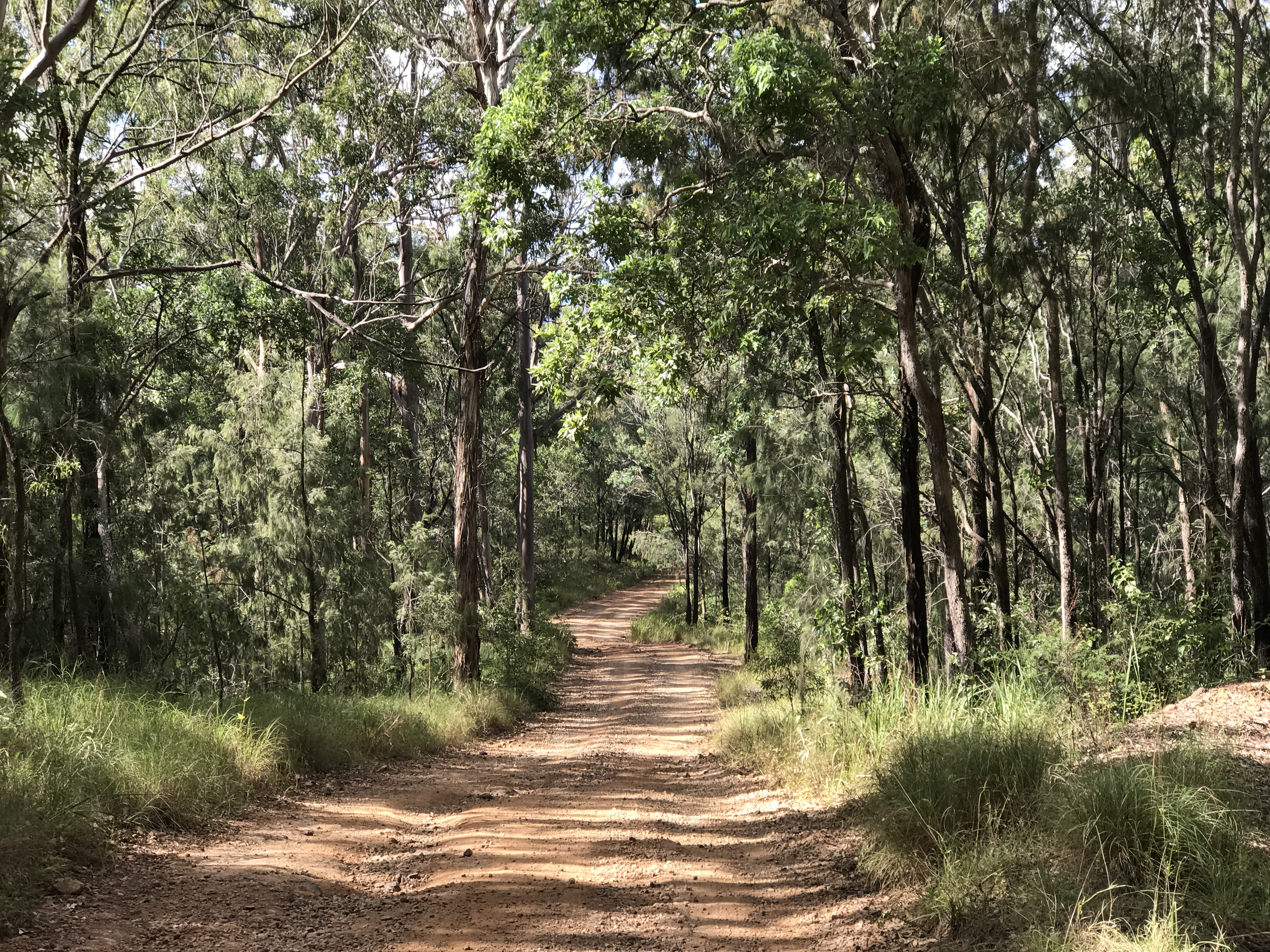
- Spicers Gap Road, eastern approach, 2017

- Location within Queensland Location within Australia
- 28.0819°S 152.4117°E
- Location: Spicers Gap Road Conservation Park (with Main Range National Park), Tregony, Southern Downs Region, Queensland, Australia

History
- Design period: 1840s - 1860s (mid-19th century)
- Built: 1859 - 1865

Queensland Heritage Register
- Official name: Spicers Gap Road Conservation Park, Spicers Gap Road, Spicers Peak Road
- Type: state heritage (built, landscape)
- Designated: 23 July 1999
- Reference no.: 601732
- Significant period: 1850s-1870s, 1930s-1940s (historical); 1859-ongoing (social)
- Significant components: quarry, views to, culvert - storm water, drain - storm water, road/roadway, views from, pole/s - telegraph

Spicers Gap Road is a heritage-listed road at Spicers Gap Road Conservation Park (in the Main Range National Park), Tregony, Southern Downs Region, Queensland, Australia. It was built from 1859 to 1865. It is also known as Spicers Gap Road Conservation Park and Spicers Peak Road. It was added to the Queensland Heritage Register on 23 July 1999.

== History ==
During his exploration of the Brisbane River with surveyor John Oxley in 1824, explorer Allan Cunningham had observed the Dividing Range to the south-west. In 1827, Cunningham led a party to explore the land beyond this range, approaching from the south and inland, from New England. Leaving the Hunter River in April 1827, Cunningham made the first recorded European discovery of the Darling Downs, along Glengallen Creek, on 5 June 1827.

On 11 June 1827, Cunningham identified a possible dray route (later known as Spicers Gap) through the Dividing Range to the coast. Cunningham returned to Sydney where he reported to Governor Ralph Darling on the quality of the country, the timber and the potential for an access route to Moreton Bay. In 1828, Cunningham returned to Moreton Bay to search for the pass through the Great Dividing Range, he travelled south-west from Ipswich and discovered Cunningham's Gap in the Great Dividing Range on 21 August 1828. Although Cunningham suspected that the newly identified pass was not the same one which he had discovered in 1827 (Spicers Gap), a search further north failed to find the other pass and he returned to Cunningham's Gap, which he then incorrectly assumed must have been the pass he identified in 1827.

Cunningham reported to the New South Wales Government on the economic significance of the pass which connected the coast lands with the extensive pastoral country to the west, however, it was not until the late 1830s and early 1840s that pastoralists began to explore the potential of the Darling Downs.

The Leslie Brothers settled the grazing lands of the southern Downs in 1840. Other squatters soon followed. Darling Downs pastoralists were faced with an expensive 800 kilometres (500 mi) trip to Maitland to carry wool to port and return with supplies to the stations. A direct route to the Moreton Bay settlement was needed. Leslie and Hodgson were able to obtain permits from Sir George Gipps, the Governor, in 1840 to have supplies sent to Brisbane; however, they still had problems with getting their stores from Brisbane over the Dividing Range to the Darling Downs. Cunningham's Gap proved almost impassable to heavy vehicles and other dray routes to the coast were sought. Alternative routes over the range included Gorman's Gap near the headwaters of Hodgson's Creek, and Hodgson's Gap via Drayton.

Squatters in the Warwick district continued to search for a southern pass through the range, and in April 1847, Henry Alphen rediscovered the pass identified by Cunningham in 1827, between Mount Mitchell and Spicers Peak. Spicer's Peak was named by Cunningham after Peter Beauclerk Spicer, a superintendent of convicts at Moreton Bay, who discovered the mountain while looking for convicts who had escaped from the Moreton Bay penal settlement. Mount Mitchell was named after the explorer, Thomas Mitchell. The pass, subsequently known as Spicers Gap, was about 4 kilometres (2.5 mi) south of Cunningham's Gap.

The discovery was announced in the Moreton Bay Courier, through which an appeal for construction of a road through Spicers Gap was launched. Little public support was forthcoming and squatters Patrick Leslie and Fred Bracker put up most of the money to clear the road and lay a "corduroy" or pine log surface. By early August, two drays had travelled to Ipswich using the new road, saving three days and approximately 100 kilometres (62 mi).

Around this time, licensed inns began catering for travellers and two inns were constructed along the new road, Balbi's at Clumber and the Main Range Hotel near the pioneer cemetery in the Main Range National Park. Alphen was rewarded for his discovery of the route through Spicers Gap by the New South Wales authorities and he built a public house. The building was weatherboard with a shingle roof, including kitchen, stables, stockyards and paddocks. Known as Alphen's Inn or the Woolpack Inn, the licence was taken over by William Jubb in 1851. After 12 years of occupation however, the inn was dismantled in 1858, owing to disputes over land ownership.

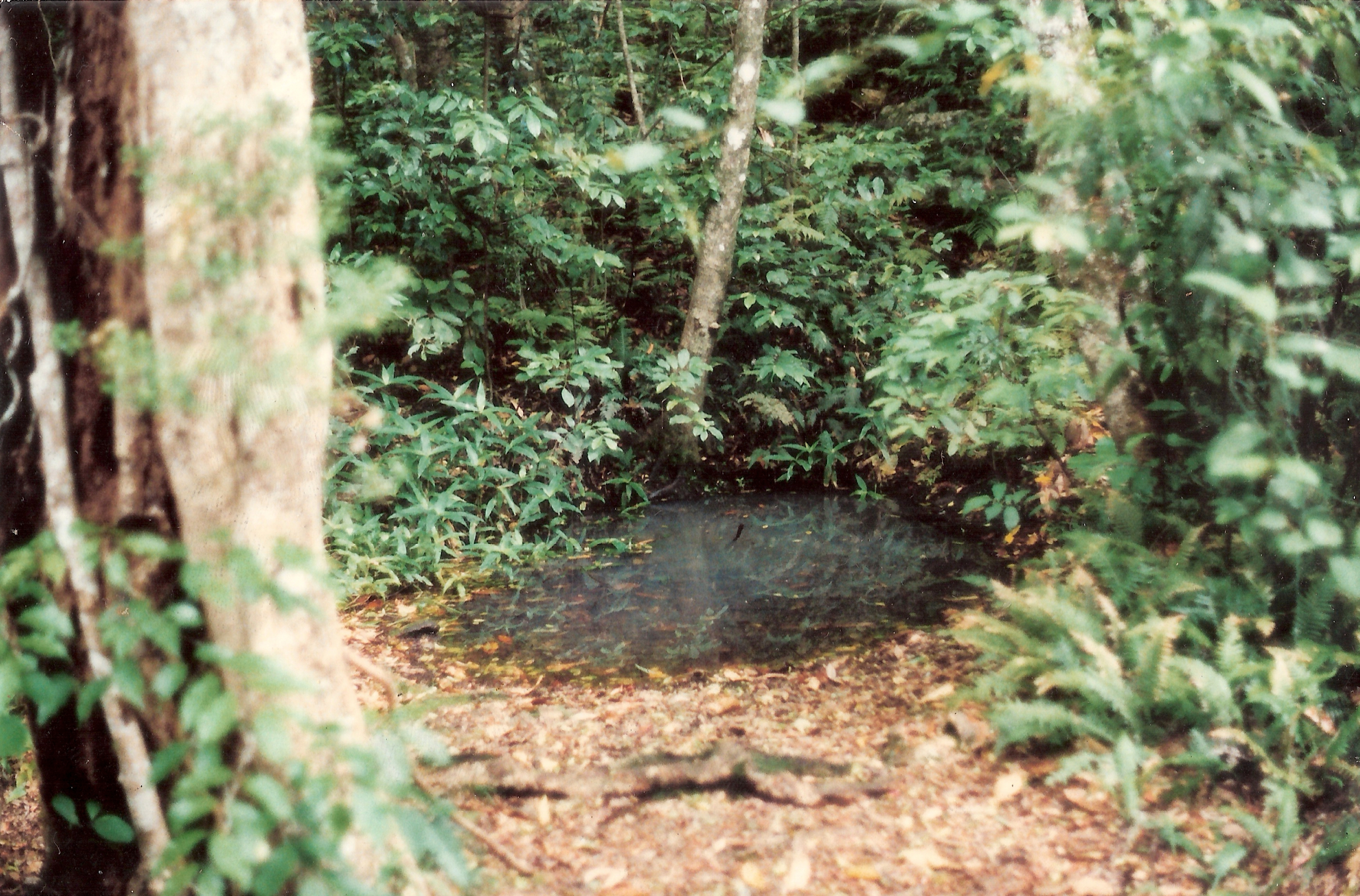
Moss's Well

In the 1850s, further attempts were made to upgrade the road. Edward Moss was contracted to upgrade a section of the road to the east of Governor's Chair using logs as foundation. The corduroy road soon collapsed making the road even more difficult to use. Although Moss did not complete his contract, the fresh water spring, known as Moss's Well, is named after him. By 1857, a team of up to 60 bullocks were need to haul a wool-laden dray through difficult sections of scrub. The New South Wales Legislative Assembly considered internal communications in the Moreton Bay District in 1856–57. In 1856, the District was granted £3500 for road works.

By January 1859, the New South Wales government was considering further work to Spicers Peak Road. The Minister for Public Works (NSW) authorised expenditure of £1200 for construction work on the road. The work was unfinished at December 1859 and from this point on, the road became the responsibility of the new Government of Queensland.

An early action of the Queensland Parliament was to appoint a Select Committee, consisting of Messrs Buckley (Chairman), Moffatt, Watts, Haly, Broughton, Raff, Taylor and Thorn, to inquire into the internal communications of the colony. Also called to give evidence at the committee were FE Roberts, the Surveyor of Roads and Augustus Charles Gregory, the Surveyor-General. Roberts favoured the use of Cunningham's Gap for the Ipswich to Warwick Road, and considered that sufficient money should be spent on Spicers Peak Road only to render it passable until a decision about a new line of road was made.

The government decided to have both passes more closely examined. On 25 August 1860, Surveyor Austin reported to Gregory upon the eligibility of Spicers Peak pass and the ineligibility of Cunningham's Gap. Austin stated that "...the surveying and levelling of the line I have selected will occupy me about a month, so that at the close of the period or about the end of September, I shall be open for another duty". On 6 October 1860, Austin informed Gregory, from the Survey Camp at Spicer's Peak that "I have surveyed and levelled the...new line proposed through Spicers Peak Pass".

Between 1860 and 1865 a properly designed and engineered road was completed. Much of the road which remains was built under the direction of Robert Austin, surveyor and later Engineer of Works. Henry Clinton, Clerk of Works, supervised a construction of up to 90 labourers.

Stone pitching was used in steeper sections of the road. Large stones were packed carefully by hand, smaller stones were then wedged between to form a heavy-duty road surface. In other sections, consolidated broken stone or "road metal" was used as foundation and surface. This design, sometimes known as "macadamising", was developed by John MacAdam, a British engineer. "Corduroy roads" were also utilised in places, possibly the result of repairs to boggy sections of the road by bullock drivers. With corduroy roads, logs were laid side by side to form a solid foundation. In 1854, Nehemiah Bartley describing the Spicers Peak corduroy road wrote: " ...the place was naturally a bottomless morass, full of springs; the logs had rotted in the middle...It was an awful place for a horse, bullock or vehicle of any kind to face...A dense wall of scrub on each hand prevented escape...A man, on foot, could, by treading on the roots of the tree, get along, but a saddle horse or bullock team, could not do this."

Drainage was a vital aspect of Austin's design, consequently, drains up to one metre in depth occur on both sides of the road. On steep slopes, the roadway was cut into the side of the hill to form a "benched" road, however, benched roads cut into hillsides sometimes posed drainage problems. Water from the side drain on the high side was directed across the road by diversionary embankments known as "whoaboys". Inverted sections or shallow drains directed water across the road and slowed the flow to stop erosion. The name "whoaboy" is said to be derived from the driver's command to the horses approaching the banks.

Austin's improvements allowed a change from bullock teams to horse teams. Heavy traffic used the Gap briefly in the 1860s but this was to be short-lived. With the coming of the railway to Warwick from Brisbane via Toowoomba in 1871, Spicers Gap Road was virtually abandoned. Heavy haulage by railways proved to be much more efficient than the slow haulage undertaken by drays and teamsters.

Following the establishment of local government in 1879, responsibility for roadworks was transferred to the Boonah and Glengallan Divisional Boards. The turn of the century period brought depression, drought and floods. The road did not produce rate revenues for the shires and, consequently, little was spent on maintenance. Interest was revived after 1910 with the development of the motor car and recreational driving. Shire Councils were lobbied to repair the road, but it was not always passable.

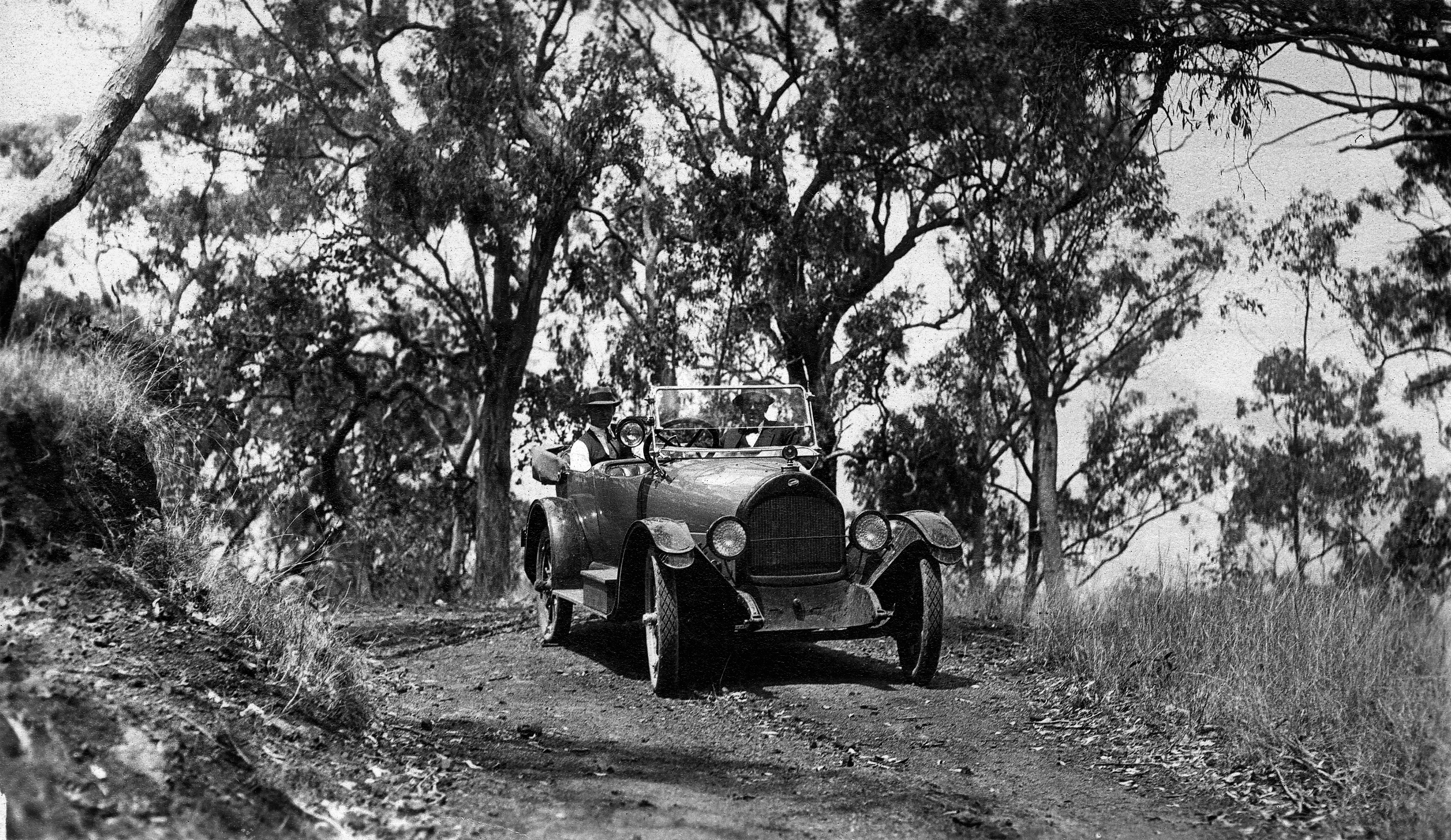
Overland on the road at Spicers Gap, 1923

In 1925–27, communities from the Darling Downs and Fassifern Valley combined to build a road through Cunningham's Gap. Debate followed regarding whether the alternative route would go through Cunningham or Spicers Gaps. In 1935, the Cunningham's Gap route was upgraded by the Main Roads Commission to a highway.

Until 1973, Spicers Gap Road carried the main telegraph link between Brisbane and New South Wales. In 1861 the single iron wire telegraph line was built establishing the first telegraph link between New South Wales and Queensland. The section over Spicers Gap Road linked up the first telegraph station at Fassifern Reserve with the station at Tregony, on the Darling Downs side. An additional line was added in 1866 between Brisbane and Stanthorpe via Ipswich, Fassifern, Spicers Gap and Warwick. In 1905, five telegraph wires formed the line. During the 1920s the iron wires were replaced with copper. The telegraph line ceased operations in 1973 and was removed in 1975.

Spicers Gap Road was maintained until the Cunningham Highway was completed. Governor's Chair became a popular spot for picnickers in the 1930s and 1940s and this continues today. Spicers Gap Road was officially opened, as an historic road, by the Minister for Transport and the Minister for Environment on 23 August 1992. The historic road was declared a Conservation Park in 1998.

== Description ==
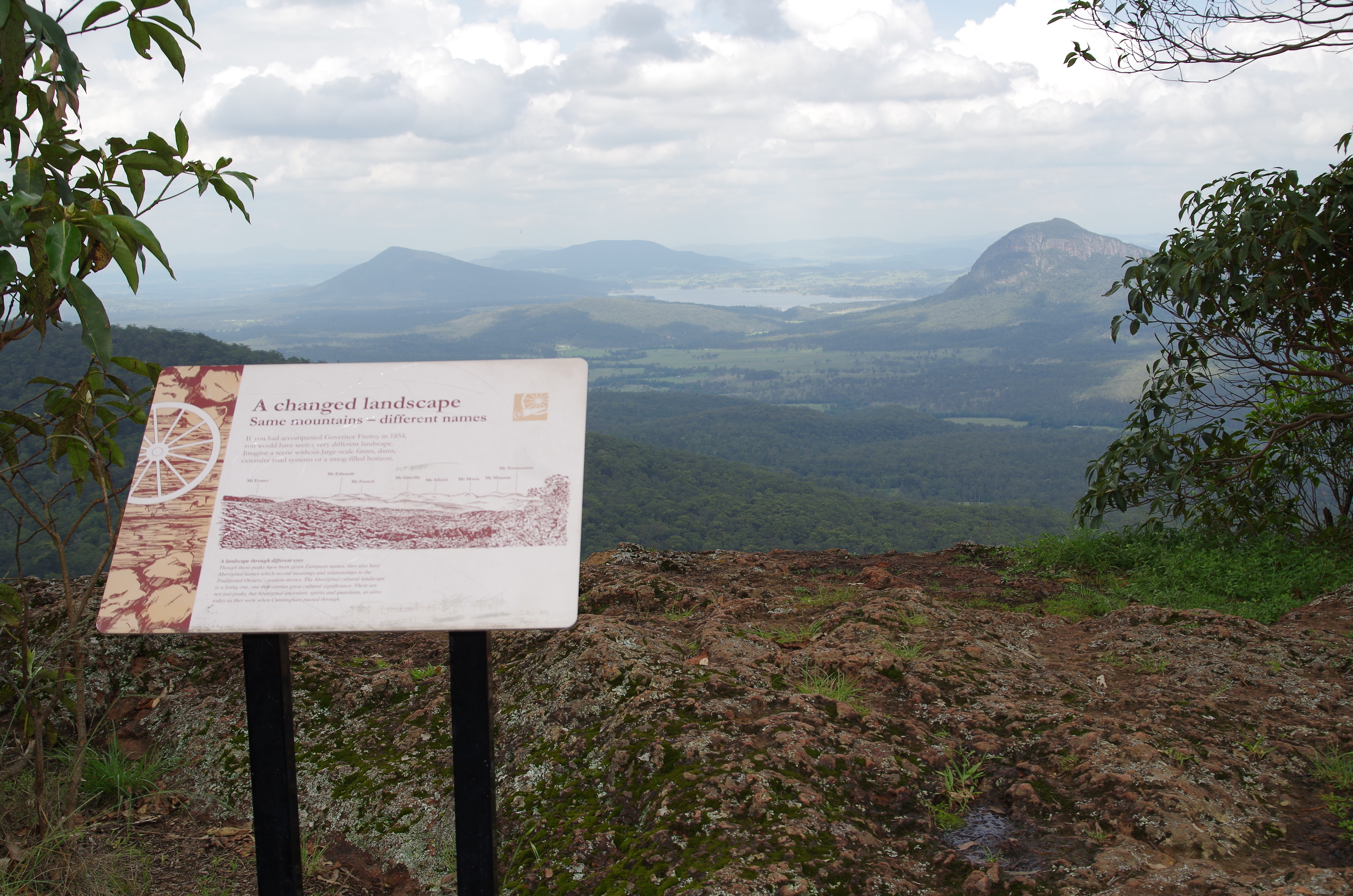
Grosvenor's Chair Lookout, 2012

Located partly within Main Range National Park, Spicers Gap Road passes through the Great Dividing Range about four kilometres south of Cunninghams Gap. The length of road contained with Main Range National Park measures approximately 4,500 metres (14,800 ft) long. Approximately 1,600 metres (5,200 ft) of Spicers Gap Road has been declared as the Spicers Gap Road Conservation Park. The section of road within the conservation park is forty metres wide the entire length of the park, and is located between Governor's Chair (Devil's Elbow) and the western boundary of the park.

Technological features exist in the form of different road surfaces used to solve various problems encountered during construction. Surfaces include macadamised surfacing; corduroy surfacing exists in two areas, 560 and 765 metres (1,837 and 2,510 ft) west of Devil's Elbow; stone pitching exists in a number of places, many in excellent condition.

Engineering features exist in the form of inverts, whoaboys and a diversionary drainage system. The remains of a whoaboy is located 868 metres (2,848 ft) west of Devil's Elbow. Over one kilometre of the road is benched as it runs across the slope of the mountain. Some of the original pick and chisel marks occur on a section of basement rock on the road 65 metres (213 ft) west of Devil's Elbow.

There are a number of other features associated with the road, including stone extraction quarries, side cuttings, a system of catch drains and culverts occurring along the entire length of the roadway. Catch drains average about 50–75 centimetres (20–30 in) in width and 20–25 centimetres (7.9–9.8 in) in depth. Some of the drains are stone pitched.

The road has suffered from the activities of four-wheel driving with damage to some of the culverts and to the adjacent metalled and stone road surfaces. Approximately 1,100 metres (3,600 ft) of the road are in fair to excellent condition. Many of the associated features are in good to excellent condition. The remains of telegraph poles, insulators and wire can be found following the route of Spicers Gap Road.

== Heritage listing ==
Spicers Gap Road Conservation Park was listed on the Queensland Heritage Register on 23 July 1999 having satisfied the following criteria.

The place is important in demonstrating the evolution or pattern of Queensland's history.

Built in 1847, with major work dating from the 1860s, Spicers Gap Road demonstrates the evolution of Queensland's transport system, and is significant as one of the first major public works of the new Queensland colony following separation from New South Wales. From the 1850s to the 1870s, Spicers Gap Road was important as the major transport route from the Southern Darling Downs to Ipswich.

Spicers Gap Road is also significant as the site of the telegraph line that carried the interstate and telephonic traffic for 112 years from 1861 to 1973. The line was the first telegraph line to run from Brisbane to Sydney and determined the direction of southerly traffic.

Spicers Gap Road is significant for its association with surveyor and engineer, Robert Austin, who oversaw the major construction of the road during the 1860s.

The place demonstrates rare, uncommon or endangered aspects of Queensland's cultural heritage.

Designed with gently sweeping curves and low gradients to cater for the heavy transport of the day, Spicers Gap Road is a rare extant example of the application of engineering from the 1860s. Engineering features, including a system of catch drains and culverts occurring along the entire length of the roadway, demonstrate technological achievement.

The place has potential to yield information that will contribute to an understanding of Queensland's history.

Spicers Gap Road is significant as it has potential to reveal more information about nineteenth century engineering techniques.

The place is important because of its aesthetic significance.

Located within the Main Range National Park, Spicers Gap Road is important for its aesthetic significance and in some areas it retains the ability to promote a sense of remoteness and ruggedness.

The place is important in demonstrating a high degree of creative or technical achievement at a particular period.

Designed with gently sweeping curves and low gradients to cater for the heavy transport of the day, Spicers Gap Road is a rare extant example of the application of engineering from the 1860s. Engineering features, including a system of catch drains and culverts occurring along the entire length of the roadway, demonstrate technological achievement.

The place has a strong or special association with a particular community or cultural group for social, cultural or spiritual reasons.

Spicers Gap Road is significant for its association with the community of the surrounding area. Spicers Gap Road is well known to all residents and is a popular tourist destination.
