= North Branch, Queensland =

North Branch, Queensland may refer to:

- North Branch, Queensland (Southern Downs Region) in Australia
- North Branch, Queensland (Toowoomba Region) in Australia
