= Lizard Point =

Lizard Point may refer to:

- Lizard Point, Cornwall, the southernmost point on the British mainland
- Lizard Point (Queensland), a rock outcrop in Australia
- Lizard Point, Antarctica, on the Beardmore Glacier
- "Lizard Point" (composition), an instrumental by Brian Eno, on the album Ambient 4: On Land

== See also ==
- The Lizard
