= Condamine River =

River in Queensland, Australia

Condamine
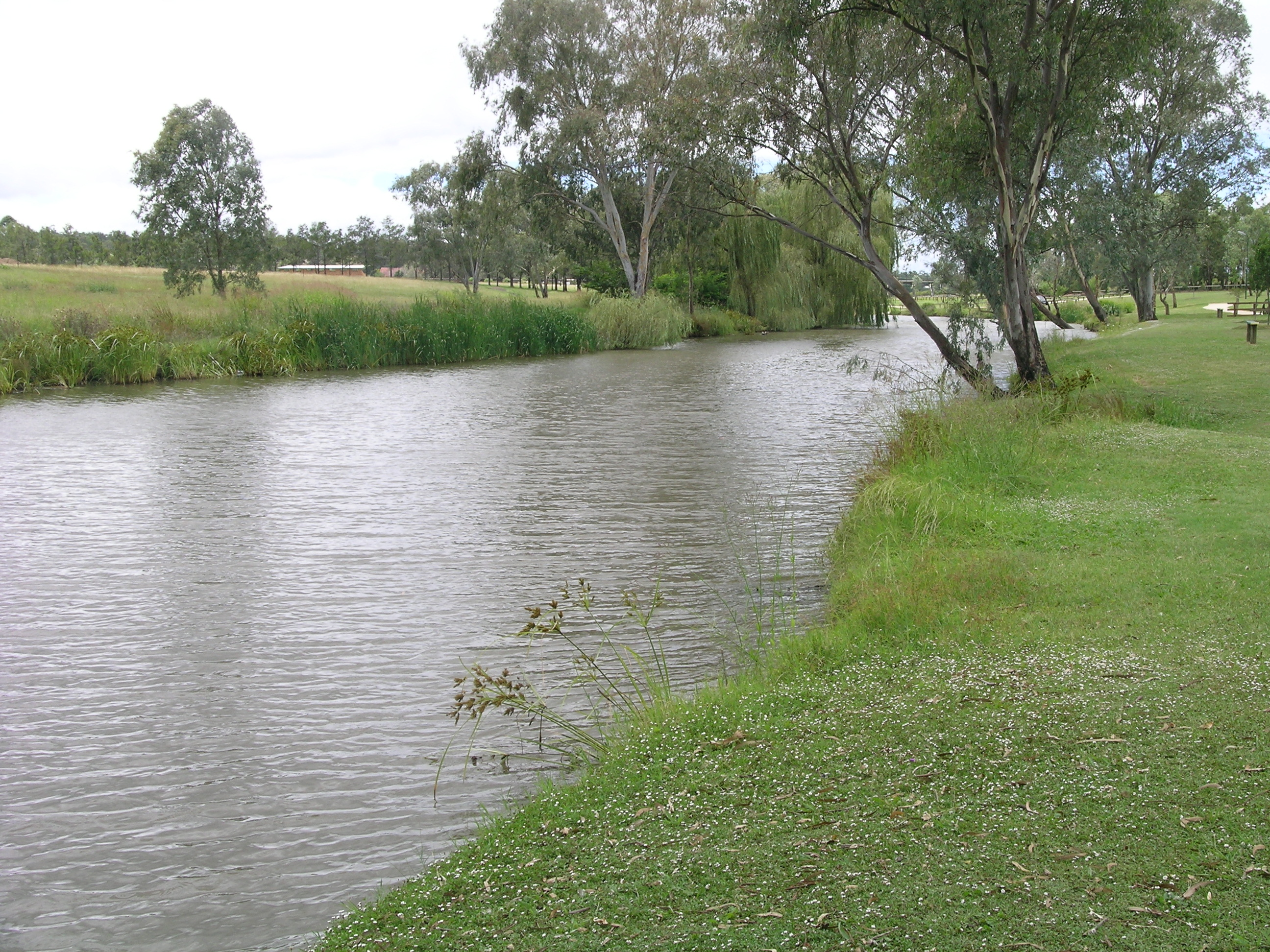
- Condamine River, Warwick, 2009

- Location of Condamine River mouth in Queensland
- Etymology: In honour of Thomas de la Condamine

Location
- Country: Australia
- State: Queensland
- Regions: Darling Downs, South West Queensland
- Settlements: Killarney, Warwick

Physical characteristics
- Source: Mount Superbus
  - location: The Head near Main Range National Park
  - coordinates: 28°14′42″S 152°28′21″E
  - elevation: 772 m (2,533 ft)
- Mouth: confluence with the Dogwood Creek to form the Balonne River
  - location: between Surat and Condamine
  - coordinates: 27°03′20″S 149°37′37″E
  - elevation: 256 m (840 ft)
- Length: 657 km (408 mi)
- Basin size: 13,292 km^{2} (5,132 sq mi)

Basin features
- River system: Balonne catchment, Murray-Darling basin
- Tributaries
  - left: Sandy Creek (Condamine River), Wilkie Creek, Wambo Creek, Undulla Creek
  - right: Emu Creek (Condamine River), Swan Creek (Condamine River), Glengallen Creek, Dalrymple Creek, Kings Creek (Condamine River), Hodgson Creek, Oakey Creek, Myall Creek, Jimbour Creek, Cooranga Creek, Charleys Creek
- Reservoirs and weirs: Talgai Weir, Yarramalong Weir, Lemon Tree Weir, Loudoun Weir, Tipton Weir, Cecil Plains Weir

The Condamine River, part of the Balonne catchment that is part of the Murray-Darling Basin, drains the northern portion of the Darling Downs, an area of sub-coastal southern Queensland, Australia. The river is approximately 500 kilometres (310 mi) long and rises on Mount Superbus, South East Queensland's highest peak, on the western slopes of the Great Dividing Range, approximately 100 kilometres (62 mi) from the east coast of Queensland, and then flows north west across the Darling Downs, then west. The Condamine River is a tributary of the Darling River.

== Course and features ==
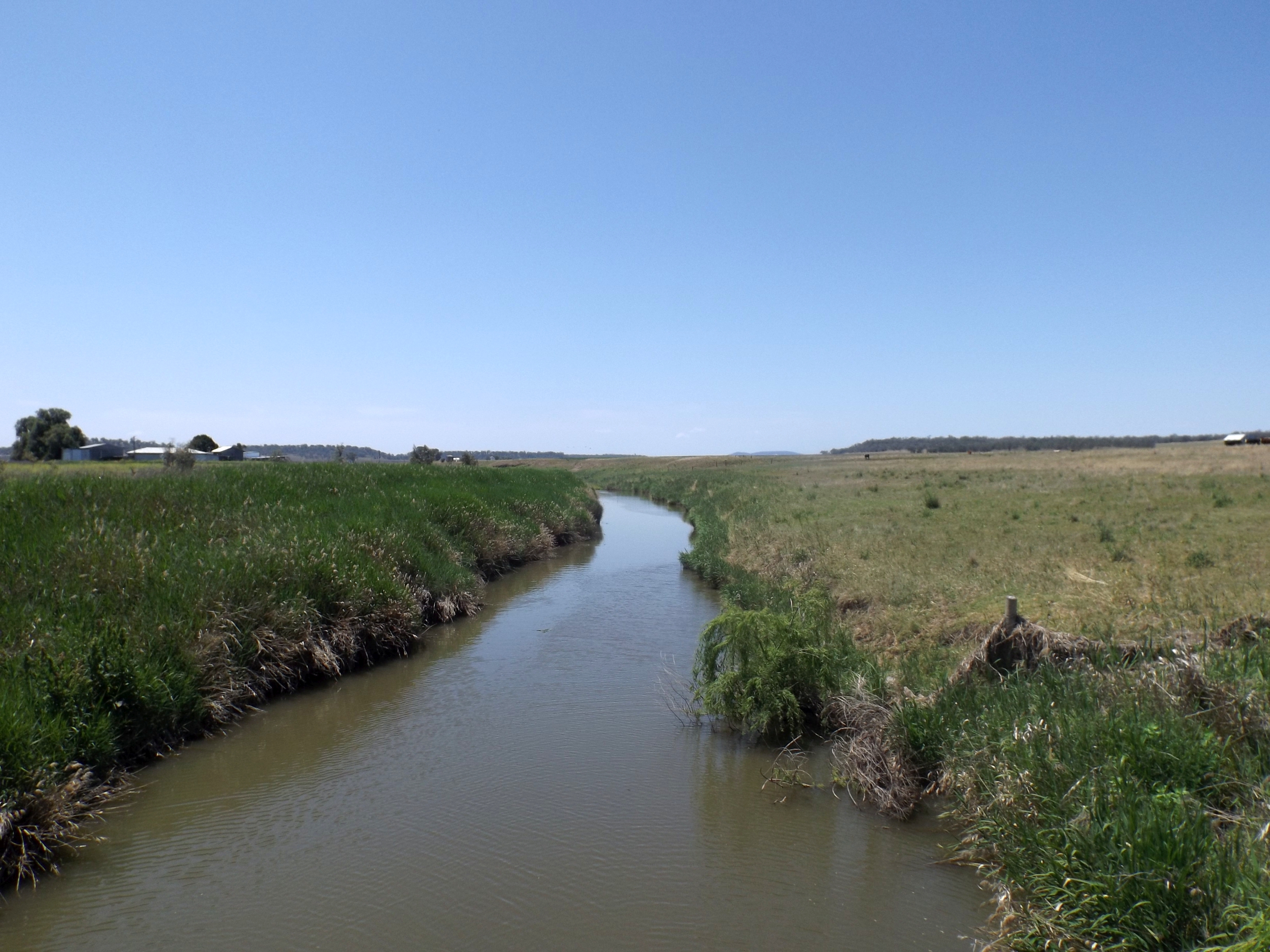
Hodgson Creek at Felton, 2014

The headwaters of the river rise on the slopes of Mount Superbus, part of the Main Range, before passing through Cambanoora Gorge. The river flows through the towns of Killarney, Warwick, and Chinchilla and the tributary Gowrie Creek drains the slopes around Toowoomba. At the junction with Dogwood Creek, south of Yuleba, the Condamine turns to the south-west and becomes known as the Balonne River. The Condamine descends 516 metres (1,693 ft) over its 657-kilometre (408 mi) course, with a catchment area of 13,292 square kilometres (5,132 sq mi). The water basin contains more than 1,800 wetlands.

The Balonne River is joined by Bungil Creek at Surat followed by the Cogoon River (Muckadilla Creek) before a major junction with the Maranoa River at Lake Kajarabie above St George from where it continues southwest to Dirranbandi. Below Dirranbandi the Balonne forks into a series of anabranches with a western distributary being called the Culgoa River which, in turn, flows into the Darling River. The eastern branch of the Balonne River in turn branches again - into the Bokhara River on the right and the Narran River on the left (eastern) side. The Narran flows to Narran Lake, an endorheic lake between Brewarrina, Walgett and Lightning Ridge. The Birrie splits from the Bokhara before these join with the Barwon River west of Brewarrina which also flows into the Darling River.

=== Water storage ===
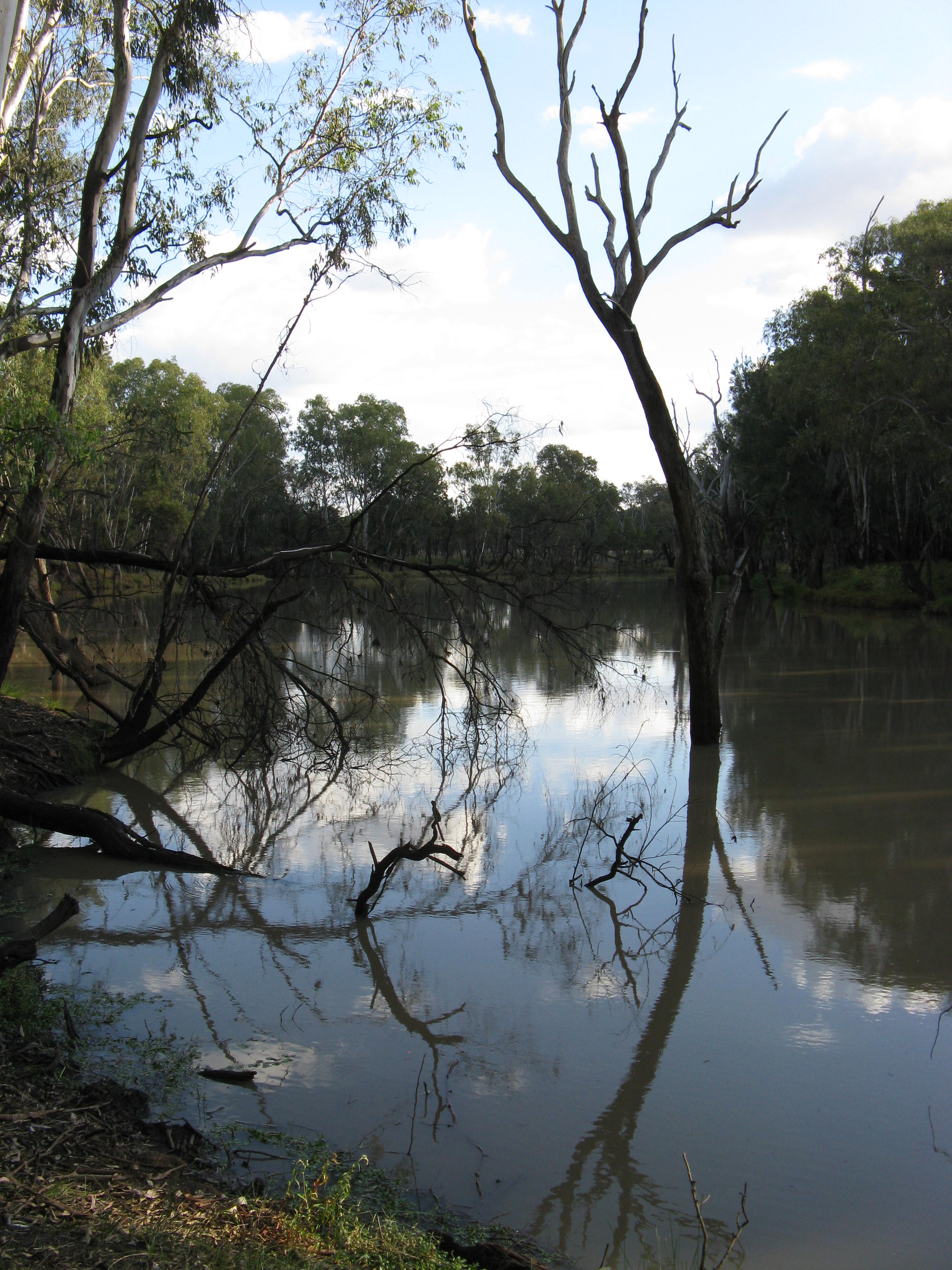
The Condamine River near Chinchilla in 2012

Water from the Condamine River is used for town water supply and for irrigation. Leslie Dam on Sandy Creek, a tributary of the Condamine, is the main water reservoir for Warwick. Talgai Weir is a small weir that can hold 640 megalitres (140×10^{6} imp gal; 170×10^{6} US gal) near Clifton. Other water storage facilities on the Condamine River include Cecil Plains Weir, Yarramalong Weir, Lemon Tree Weir, Talgai Weir, Melrose Weir, and Nangwee Weir.

=== Chinchilla Weir ===
The Chinchilla Weir was built in 1973 and is located on the Condamine River, eight kilometres south of the town of Chinchilla. The weir has the dual purpose of providing supply of irrigation water along the alluvial flats of the Condamine River and of augmenting the water supply to the town of Chinchilla. Chinchilla Weir is a concrete faced earthfill structure and is known for the unique curved design of its wall. The weir is the only storage for the Chinchilla Weir Water Supply Scheme.

At the official opening of the Weir in 1974, approximately 5000 people were counted through the gates. Chinchilla Weir remains a freshwater playground for locals and visitors with waterskiing, canoeing, swimming and fishing being popular activities.

== History ==
For at least 12,000 years, parts of the water catchment have been the lands of the Bundjalung people. The Condamine River was named by Allan Cunningham in 1827 for Thomas de la Condamine, a former aide-de-camp to Governor Ralph Darling, who became the colony's first Collector of Internal Revenue. Patrick Leslie was the first European settler in the area. He established Canning Downs station in 1840, near Warwick.

In 1843, the European traveller and explorer Ludwig Leichhardt noted that the river was completely waterless with only deep waterholes present. Wells in the sandy soil needed to be dug 35 feet to reach water.

The European explorer, Thomas Mitchell, crossed the Balonne River on St George's Day, 23 April 1846. The next year, Leichhardt spent 6 weeks exploring the course of the Condamine River.

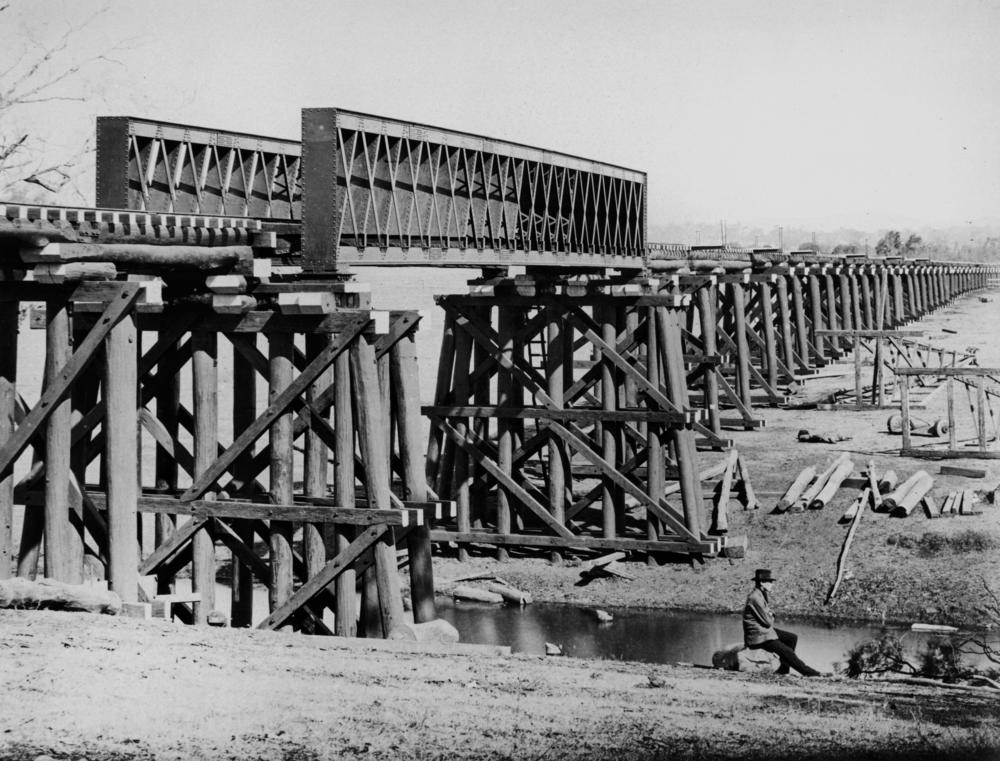
Railway bridge construction at Warwick, 1882

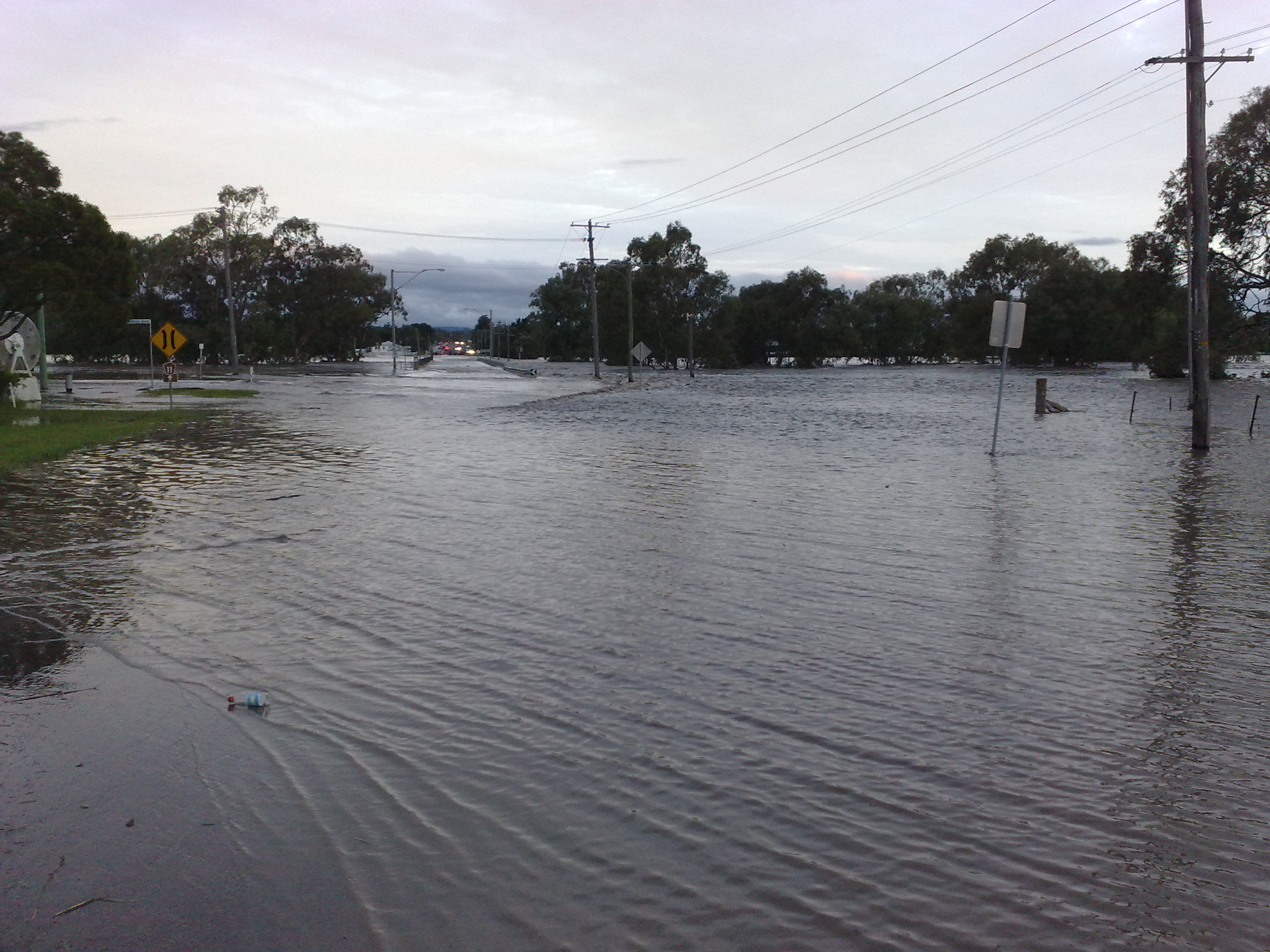
Flooded Victoria Street, Warwick, 2010

In 1985, the Water Research Foundation of Australia proposed to transfer water from the Clarence River to the Condamine water basin. The Condamine River and its catchment area were involved in the 2010–11 Queensland floods. During the floods the river reached a record peak at Condamine of 15.25 metres (50.0 ft) and another peak of 14.67 metres (48.1 ft).

=== Coal seam gas industry ===
In around 2000, the coal seam gas industry began exploring for unconventional gas in the Chinchilla region, through which the Condamine River flows, when Bob Bryan formed The Queensland Gas Company (QGC). Initially supplying gas into the domestic market, the industry grew quickly with the advent of the CSG/LNG industry and building of export facilities in Gladstone.

The gas is found in the coal seams and is adsorbed into the coal by water pressure. To extract gas from coal seams it is necessary to remove the water from the coal seams to allow the gas to flow. The de-watering of the Walloon Coal Measures has been raised as a concern by landholders, as stock water bores drilled into the coal seams can be affected by reduced water flows or gas. Under Queensland law, gas companies are required to "make good" if there is an impairment on a landholder's bore.

The Walloon Coal Measures are hydraulically connected to the aquifers of the Great Artesian Basin (within the Surat Basin) and in some locations immediately underlies the Condamine Alluvium.

=== Methane gas seeps ===
In 2012, methane gas was observed escaping from the river. The gas that is seeping is derived either from the underlying Walloon Coal Measures and/or the Springbok Sandstone. The Queensland Government investigated the gas seeps, and the technical study concluded that the bubbling was unlikely to be caused by coal seam gas (CSG) activities in the region, but that further studies were required. In relation to the presence of methane in the river, the report concluded that “…there is no safety risk or evidence of environmental harm occurring in the immediate area from the Condamine River gas seeps."

In April 2016, the Condamine River seeps were brought to the forefront of media attention by New South Wales Greens MP Jeremy Buckingham, when he allegedly set alight the methane gas bubbling from the riverbed. He claimed that "hydraulic fracturing" was the likely cause for the problem, but to date there is no direct link.

In 2017, CSIRO researchers with expertise in hydrogeology, geology, ecology, and biogeochemistry assessed the Condamine River to determine what is currently known about the methane seeps in the River, including natural and human causes, and the potential human and environmental health and safety impacts of methane escaping from underground. They concluded that there could be several reasons for the methane releases, but conceded that "depressurisation of the Walloon Coal Measures during gas production could generate horizontal migration of methane gas. However, this flux of methane is likely to be small because of the shallow dip of the coal beds and the distance to gas production fields." Other reasons for variation in bubbles includes changes in water flow, or flooding changing groundwater patterns. Hydraulic fracturing is not considered to be the cause, as there has been no hydraulic fracturing in those fields.

Natural gas seeps are not altogether uncommon in Queensland, but there are no recorded instances of bubbles occurring in a river. The Queensland Gasfields Commission (a government agency) identified 17 soil gas surveys from the 1980s and 1990s taken around the state that record naturally occurring methane releases; the nearest one to the bubbling in the Condamine River was 16 km distant and not linked to the river. These measured low levels of mixed gas ranging from less than 10 parts per million (ppm) to 240ppm occurring in the subsoil at depths of up to one metre.

In 2017, the gas company that holds the tenure over this area of the river reported a 90% reduction in seepage levels compared to the peak rate recorded in early 2016. This was done by intercepting and producing the gas before it reached the river, effectively taking it out of the system.

== See also ==
- List of rivers of Australia § Queensland
