= Spicers Gap Road Conservation Park =

Protected area in Queensland, Australia

- IUCN category III (natural monument or feature)
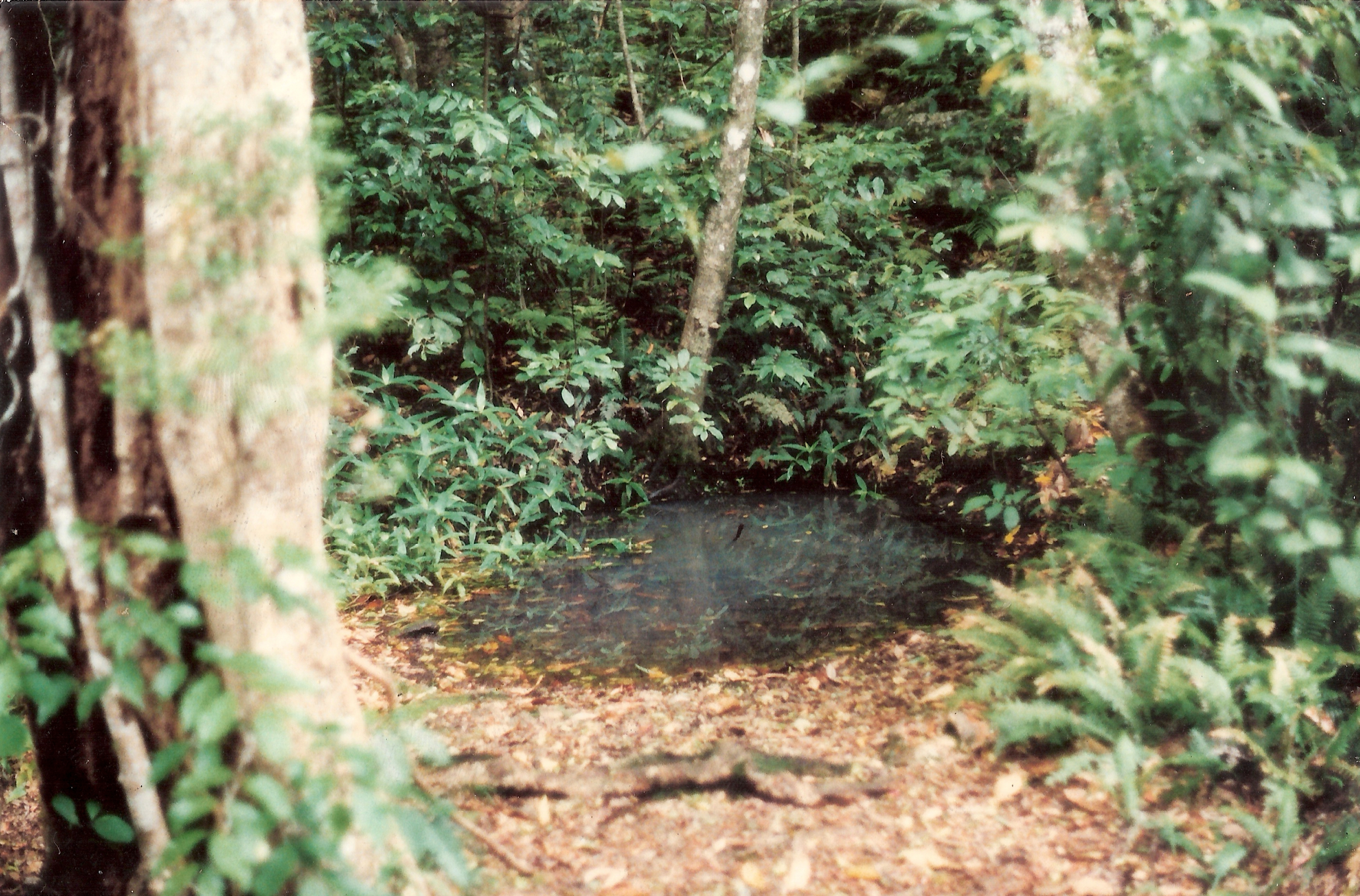
- Moss's Well is a natural spring

- Location within Queensland
- Location: Queensland
- Nearest city: Killarney
- Coordinates: 28°04′35″S 152°23′26″E
- Established: 1998
- Governing body: Queensland Parks and Wildlife Service

The Spicers Gap Road Conservation Park is a protected conservation park located within the Main Range National Park in south east Queensland, Australia. The park is part of the Main Range group World Heritage Site Gondwana Rainforests of Australia inscribed in 1986 and added to the Australian National Heritage List in 2007.

The park draws its name from Spicers Gap, located near Killarney.

== History ==
The Spicers Gap Road is the original route that links the Darling Downs with Brisbane. It was used by Cobb and Co Coaches and was later replaced by the Cunninghams Gap Road named after explorer Allan Cunningham who established the route. The road was constructed by convicts during the 19th century and was listed on the Queensland Heritage Register in 1999.

Until the late 1990s, Spicers Gap Road was a popular diversion from the Cunningham Highway for adventurous off-roaders. It was at times a challenging and rough route, usable only by 4WDs and made more difficult by the muddy clay soil that is common to the region. As a result of this increasing popularity, and the carelessness of some users, 1.6 kilometres (0.99 mi) of the road was closed to vehicles by Queensland National Parks and gazetted as a conservation park. This is the section at the crest of the gap and was done in order to preserve some of the road's unique 19th century engineering features.

== See also ==
- Protected areas of Queensland
