= Thomas de la Condamine =

British colonial administrator (1797–1873)

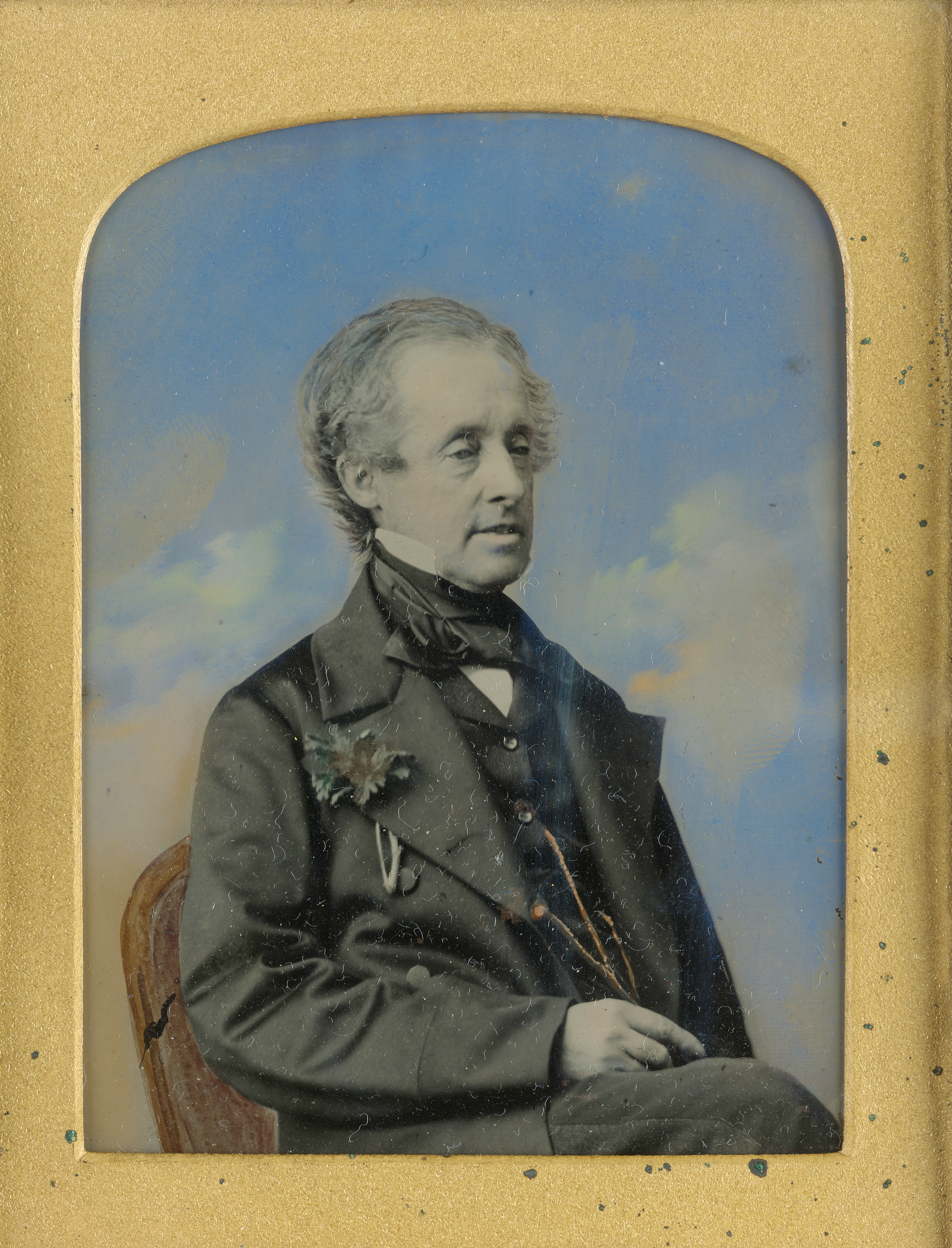
- Thomas De La Condamine, London, c. 1852 – c. 1855
- Born: 1797; Guernsey, Channel Islands, United Kingdom
- Died: 24 June 1873 (aged 75–76); Ryde, Isle of Wight
- Occupation: aide-de-camp
- Known for: Aide-de-camp to Governor Ralph Darling and founding member of the Australian Subscription Library

Thomas de la Condamine (1797–1873) was born in Guernsey, and was the grandson of the Parisian hairdresser thought to have invented the Peruke (a men's wig made from curls on the side and drawn at the nape of the neck). He received his education at the Royal Military College, Sandhurst and in June 1814 was commissioned as an ensign before entering the Royal Staff Corps in November 1815. He later joined the 57th (West Middlesex) Regiment of Foot, where he was promoted to lieutenant, in March 1825. On 17 December 1825 he arrived in Sydney as the 28-year-old aide-de-camp to Governor Ralph Darling.

While in Sydney his influence extended well beyond his military rank as he was one of Governor Darling's most trusted staff officers and he implemented many of his reforms. But his tenure was not without opposition. When Darling appointed him Military Secretary and tried to make him Collector of Internal Revenue, William Huskisson the Secretary of State refused to confirm him in this role. Even so, he remained a trusted member of Darling's staff and from 1827 to 1828 he worked as Private Secretary and Clerk of the Legislative and Executive Councils.

The often unfounded criticism of his role in colony seems to have been primarily driven by his youth and his proximity to Governor, which led to diminishing opportunities for older military personnel.

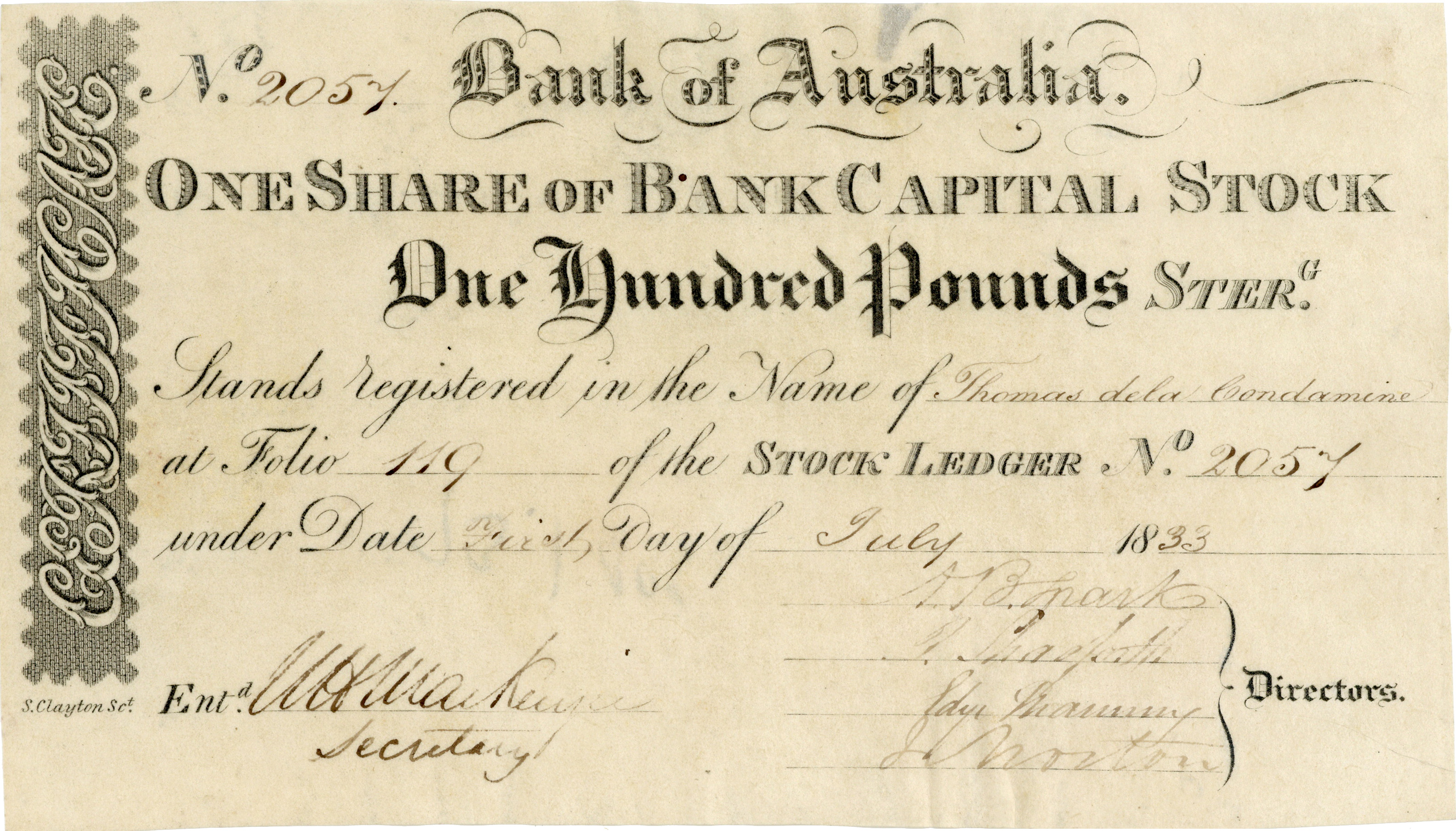
Stock certificate of the Bank of Australia for £100 issued to Thomas de la Condamine, 1833

Condamine's influence extended beyond purely administrative matters. A committed Christian, Condamine dedicated much of his time to philanthropic pursuits including: the Carters' Barracks in Sydney; Orphan School; the Parramatta Female Factory; The Sydney Dispensary; the Auxiliary Bible Society and the Female School of Industry. Perhaps his most enduring legacy was his initiation and administration of the Australian Subscription Library, which later formed the basis of the State Library of New South Wales collections.

It was Condamine, who in 1826, called together the men, all elite Sydney gentlemen, who would found the Library and outlined to them the virtues of forming a subscription library which could both enlighten and entertain the people of Sydney. Among those present were William Cowper, Richard Hill, Alexander Macleay and Judge Burton - all of whom supported the idea. Condamine appears to have gathered the founding members together on 3 February 1826 to discuss the proposed Library and a further meeting at the Sydney Hotel on 25 February agreed on the resolutions. These were formally adopted on the 20 March 1826.

While Macleay was appointed president, it was Condamine who sent out to England the orders for books on history, science and biography. He was also responsible for cataloguing and arranging donations of book made by the Governor, Archdeacon Scott and the bequest of former provost-marshal, John Thomas Cambell. The Library was opened on 1 October 1827, in No.1 Terry's Buildings, in Pitt Street.

The bulk of the work, during the early years, fell upon De La Condamine, who continued as Honorary Secretary until his departure with his Regiment.

Condamine left New South Wales in February 1831 and once back in England, gave evidence before the select committee on secondary punishments and the poor moral state of the colony. In 1832 he was promoted captain and transferred to the unattached list. By 1841 he was living with his wife Janet (née Agnew) and his daughters Eleanor and Henrietta, at 9 Barfield, Ryde, Isle of Wight. Condamine died on 24 June 1873 and Janet died a year later on 21 June 1874. She was buried next to her husband in the cemetery of the Holy Trinity Church, Ryde.

== Named in his honour ==
In June 1827 explorer Allan Cunningham named the Condamine River in Queensland, Australia, after Condamine. The town of Condamine on the river and other nearby place names are also named after him.
