= Australian Subscription Library =

Former library in Australia

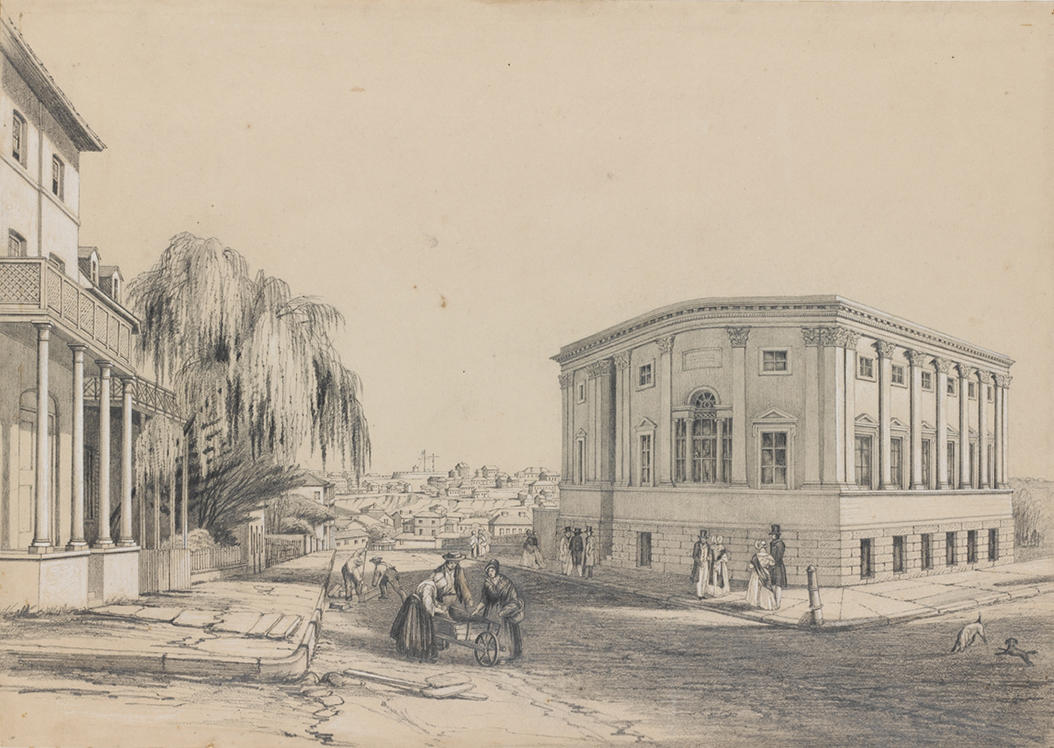
- The Australian Subscription Library, 1843–1847, Jacob William Jones
- Location: Australia
- Established: 1826
- Dissolved: 1869

The Australian Subscription Library was the first library to exist outside of private collections in Australia. Started in 1826 as the 'Sydney Australian Subscription Library and Reading Room' it shortened its name to the 'Australian Subscription Library' in 1834, and then in 1853 changed its name to the 'Australian Library and Literary Institute’. Its assets were brought by the Government of New South Wales in 1869, and it became the 'Free Public Library'. As the collections and services provided by the 'Free Public Library' expanded it became the State Library of New South Wales, which includes the Mitchell and Dixon library collections.

== History ==
The Library's origins can be dated back to a meeting of an elite group of gentlemen at the Sydney Hotel, on 3 February 1826. They were brought together by Thomas de la Condamine, Governor Ralph Darling's aide-de-camp, who laid out before those present a scheme for the establishment a public library.

A further meeting at Sydney Hotel on 25 February agreed on the resolutions but these were not formally adopted until the 20 March 1826. At this meeting they agreed to abide by a strict set of rules for loaning, reading and purchase of books and also paid a £5 admission fee and £2 per year for a continued membership. Women were not allowed to be members until 1846. The Library's first reading room was opened at No. 1, Terry's Buildings in Pitt Street, Sydney 1 October 1827.

In 1831, Governor Ralph Darling gifted the Library the two building allotments located in Hyde Park for a new library building and two allotments in the area of Rushcutters Bay to be sold for funding the library's development. The Library moved to the Old Sydney Post Office on George Street in December 1831.

On 29 July 1834, an Act was passed which allowed the library to own land and sell shares and changed its name to the “Australian Subscription Library.” Around this time there were offers to erect a permanent building for the Library at the government's expense but this was turned down as the members forwent their claim to the site of building allotment. Ironically Governor Richard Bourke's preferred location was close to where the Library would later be built, as it was in the Government Domain,

in that part of the prolongation of Bent Street, intervening between the site of the old windmill, at the end of Macquarie Street, and the Botanical Gardens.

In May 1836, while expressing their unhappiness about the location of their new building, library members were forced to move to the upper floor of Chief Justice Francis Forbes' residence, at Bridge and Gresham streets. In May 1840, they sold the allotments in Hyde Park and Rushcutters Bay to raise money to start work on a new building at Bent and Macquarie Streets. Commenced in 1843, it was finally completed in November 1845. It became the first permanent building specifically designed to house the collections.

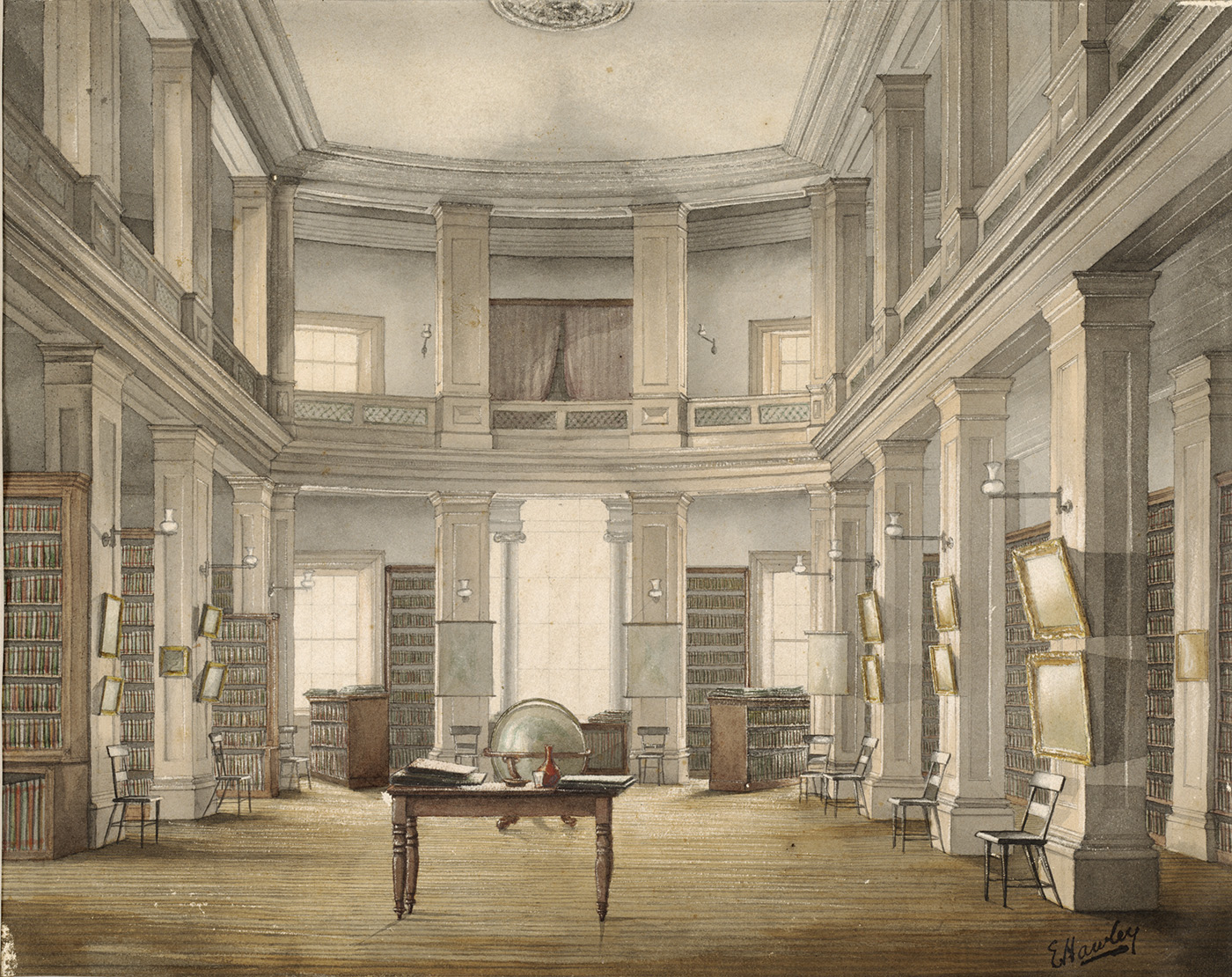
Australian Library and Literary Institution 1868 by E. Hawley wr a1528558

The ownership of land and new building also brought on the decision to make a major change to its management structure. On 7 October 1853, the library passed an Act of Incorporation and renamed itself the ‘Australian Library and Literary Institute’, in effect making it a public company with 1000 shares set at 25 pounds each.

According to long-term member George Miller, this was done to imitate similar institutions in England and create a body of shareholders, "who would, in fact, be the holders of the property, and thus become interested in its welfare and advancement."

However, the limited number of shareholders caused ongoing financial difficulties for the library who finally decided in 1869 to offer the building and books to the Government to clear their debts. On 22 September 1869, the government bought the Library's books for £1500 and also rented their building for 12 months at £800 in advance, also holding the right to buy that building for £4000 or over.

Mr Walker, the Inspector of Public Charities, was appointed its new Librarian, while Mr Hawley, the old Librarian, was appointed as his assistant. The new libraries collections included transfers of books and records held in other Government Departments and the addition of the Judge Wise collection of Australian material. On 30 September the building reopened as the Free Public Library with the new management. After 40 years work, there was a library in Sydney with free access to magazines, journals and books.

The library was now free to use and became a source of education and information for ordinary people. From 1895 it was known as the Public Library of NSW, then the purpose-built Mitchell Library was opened in 1910 to house the David Scott Mitchell collection and the whole library was renamed the State Library of NSW in 1975.
