= North Branch, Queensland (Southern Downs Region) =

North Branch
- Suburb
- Interactive map of North Branch
- Coordinates: 28.0211°S 152.3161°E
- Country: Australia
- State: Queensland
- LGA: Southern Downs Region
- Location: 10.5 km (6.5 mi) NE of Maryvale; 38.4 km (23.9 mi) NE of Warwick; 40.6 km (25.2 mi) E of Allora; 137 km (85 mi) SW of Brisbane

Government
  - State electorate: Southern Downs
  - Federal division: Maranoa

Area
  - Total: 61.2 km^{2} (23.6 sq mi)

Population
  - Total: 46 (2021 census)
  - Density: 0.752/km^{2} (1.947/sq mi)
- Time zone: UTC+10:00 (AEST)
- Postcode: 4370
Suburbs around North Branch
| Goomburra | Goomburra | Goomburra |
| Maryvale | North Branch | Tregony |
| Maryvale | Tregony | Tregony |

North Branch is a rural locality in the Southern Downs Region, Queensland, Australia. In the 2021 census, North Branch had a population of 46 people.

== Geography ==
North Branch has the following mountains:

- Mount Develin (28.0229°S 152.3215°E) 956 metres (3,136 ft)
- Taylors Peak (28.0450°S 152.2878°E) 860 metres (2,820 ft)

Part of the Main Range National Park is in the north-east of the locality. Apart from this protected area, the land use is predominantly grazing on native vegetation with some crop growing.

== Demographics ==
In the 2016 census, North Branch had a population of 52 people.

In the 2021 census, North Branch had a population of 46 people.

== Education ==
There are no schools in North Branch. The nearest government primary school is Maryvale State School in neighbouring Maryvale to the south-west. The nearest government secondary schools are Allora State School (to Year 10) in Allora to the west and Warwick State High School (to Year 12) in Warwick to the south-west. There are also non-government schools in Allora and Warwick.
