= Mount Steamer =

Mountain in Queensland, Australia

- Location within Queensland

Highest point
- Elevation: 1,196 m (3,924 ft)
- Coordinates: 28°11′47″S 152°27′11″E

Geography
- Location: Queensland, Australia

Mount Steamer is a mountain in Emu Vale in the Scenic Rim Region, Queensland, Australia. It is 1,196 metres (3,924 ft) high and is part of the Great Dividing Range.

It marks the intersection between the Main Range and The Steamer Range. Walking to the summit is a tough undertaking from any of its spurs.

== History ==
From 1922 to 16 July 1988 Mount Steamer was the official name of the mountain at the intersection of Davies Ridge and the Main Range (28.1811°S 152.4411°E), approximately 2 kilometres (1.2 mi) north-west of its current location.

== See also ==
- List of mountains in Australia
