= Lizard Point (Queensland) =

Coordinates: 28°11′32.5″S 152°28′16.5″E

Lizard Point, Queensland is a rocky outcrop between Mount Steamer and Mount Roberts. It offers great panoramic views of the Main Range National Park, Boonah and other Scenic Rim areas.
