= Mount Superbus =

Mountain in Queensland, Australia

- Location within Queensland

Highest point
- Elevation: 1,375 m (4,511 ft)
- Listing: Mountains of Australia
- Coordinates: 28°12′59″S 152°27′59″E

Geography
- Country: Australia
- State: Queensland
- Protected area: Main Range National Park
- Parent range: Main Range

Geology
- Mountain type: Volcanic plug

Mount Superbus lies 99 kilometres (62 miles) south-west of the centre of Brisbane, Australia and is South East Queensland's highest peak at 1,375 metres (4,511 feet). At this elevation, it is the fifth-highest peak in Queensland, after Mount Bartle Frere at 1,622 metres (5,322 feet), Mount Bellenden Ker at 1,593 metres (5,226 feet), Mount Fisher at 1,385 metres (4,544 feet) and Mount Carbine Tableland at 1,383 metres (4,537 feet), all in Far North Queensland.

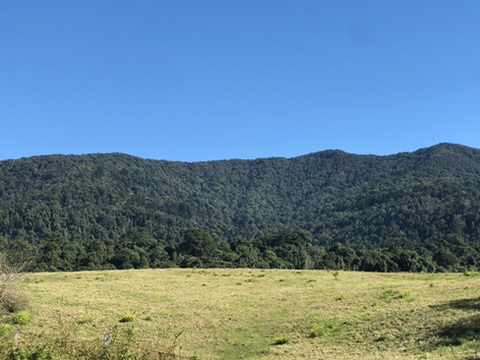
Mt Superbus from head RD

It has an extensive logging history dating back to the mid-19th century. Mount Superbus was originally covered in dense hoop pine forests. Red cedar and other valuable timbers were also heavily logged in the area. It is now part of the Main Range National Park.

The peak is a remnant of the Main Range shield volcano which erupted between 25 and 22 million years ago.

On the southernmost peak just below the summit lies the wreck of a RAAF Lincoln bomber. It crashed into the mountain in the early hours of Easter Saturday morning on 9 April 1955, during a medical evacuation of a sick baby from Townsville to Eagle Farm airfield in Brisbane. The crew of four RAAF personnel and the two passengers were all killed in this accident. Most of the wreckage still lies near the summit and is a popular day walk for bushwalkers.

The Condamine River rises from a spring located on the western slopes of Mount Superbus. Teviot Brook, a major tributary of the Logan River, has its headwaters on the eastern facing slopes of the mountain.

== See also ==
- Wilsons Peak
