= Mount Huntley =

Mountain in Australia

Coordinates: 28°09′S 152°26′E

Mount Huntley is one of the mountains of the Main Range in south-east Queensland, Australia. It is within the Main Range National Park. There are no marked walking trails to the summit, and the ascent is long and very steep with some dangerous sections. There is a clearing at the summit for hikers to camp in, however no water is available. It is possible to see Lake Moogerah and other local landmarks from Mount Huntley.
