= Steamer Range =

Rock formations in Queensland, Australia

- Location within Australia

Highest point
- Coordinates: 28°16′13″S 151°36′34″E

Geography
- Location: Queensland, Australia

The Steamer Range is a series of rock formations branching off the Main Range National Park in Queensland, Australia. They lie at the head of Emu Creek, west of Warwick, in the Main Range. Viewed from most angles, with a little imagination, the range looks like a steamboat.

The Mast formation was climbed on 24 August 1950 by Bob Waring and Jon Stephenson, and the Funnel formation was climbed on 1 December 1950 by Bob Waring and Kemp Fowler. The local sawmill had a 200-pound prize for the first person to do this; however, neither Bob nor Kemp received any money for their accomplishments.
