= Spicers Peak =

Mountain in Australia

- Binkinjoora
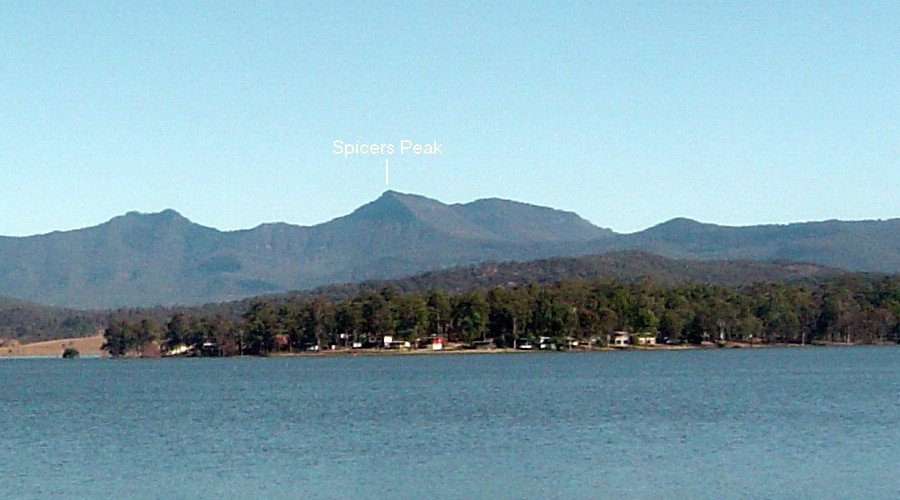
- Main Range with Spicers Peak indicated

Highest point
- Elevation: 1,205 m (3,953 ft)
- Coordinates: 28°05′58″S 152°24′23″E

Geography
- Location within Queensland
- Location: Location in Queensland
- Parent range: Main Range National Park

Spicers Peak (Aboriginal: Binkinjoora) is a mountain in Australia. It lies roughly 120 km west of Brisbane in the middle of the Main Range National Park. It is just south of Cunninghams Gap and Mount Mitchell. Its summit height is approximately 1,205 metres (3953 ft).

The only known track to the summit is through private land, although there is easy access across country through the national park from Spicers Gap Road. Access is possible with The Scenic Rim Trail by Spicers that provides a guided walk to the summit. The upper section of the Peak displays views as far back as Brisbane and encompasses a world heritage listed rainforest.

The local Uragapul people call this mountain, Binkinjoora, meaning a turtle with its head sticking up. The name, Spicer's Gap, was given to the mountain by Allan Cunningham after Peter Beauclerk Spicer who was the Superintendent of convicts. Spicer had noted the peak while searching for escaped convicts.

The peak is located just to the south of Spicers Gap which was once the main route between Brisbane and the Darling Downs.

== See also ==
- List of mountains in Australia
- Scenic Rim
