= Spicers Gap =

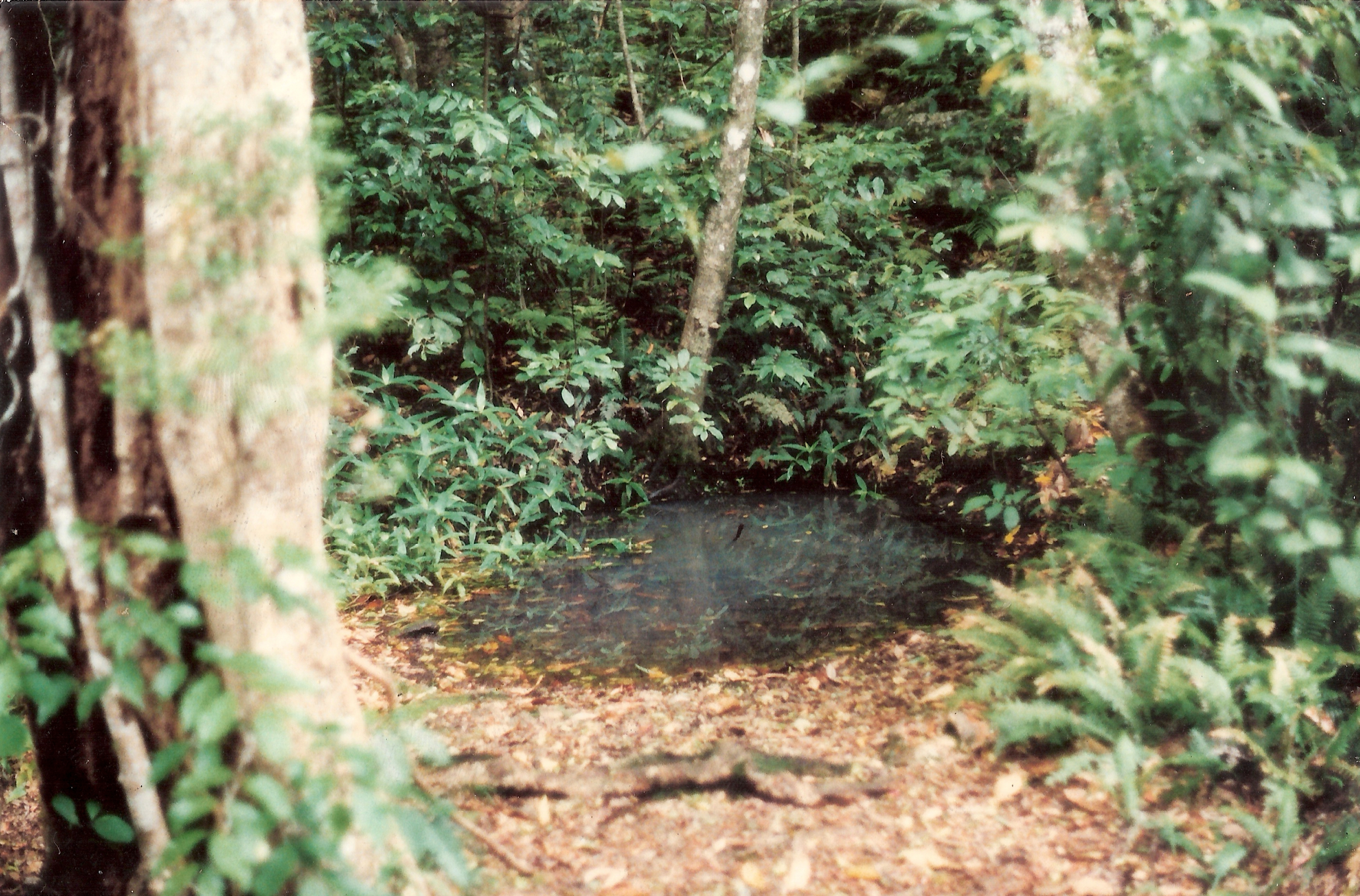
- Moss's Well is a natural spring

- Location within Queensland
- Elevation: 755 metres (2,477 ft)

Third Approach
- Location: Swanfels, Queensland, Australia
- Range: Main Range
- Coordinates: 28°04′13″S 152°24′52″E

Spicers Gap is a mountain pass that is located 100 kilometres (62 mi) west of Brisbane, Queensland, Australia, and was the original route over the Great Dividing Range in the area around Brisbane. Today it is included in Main Range National Park and is a popular destination for campers and bushwalkers. To the south of the gap is Spicers Peak. To the west of the mountain pass is Spicers Gap State Forest. Both the state forest and national park are part of the Gondwana Rainforests of Australia.

The crest of Spicers Gap is preserved as Spicers Gap Road Conservation Park and is accessible via conventional vehicle from east and west, although in places the road is very rough, and the road through the Park is blocked to vehicles. On the steep passage to the Gap from the east, visitors pass a cemetery, Moss's Well and the site of a former hotel. Moss's Well was named after Edward Moss, a contractor who helped build the original road.

== History ==
Spicers Gap is believed to have been a route for indigenous Australian traders travelling between the inland and the coast.

In 1828, Allan Cunningham established the route through the mountains now called Cunninghams Gap. Cunningham named Spicers Gap and Spicers Peak after Peter Beauclerk Spicer, Superintendent of convicts, but didn't suggest the pass should be used for transport.

Stockman Henry Alphen discovered Spicers Gap 7 km south of Cunninghams Gap in 1847. The road through the pass was originally built by convicts during the 1850s and 1860s. This trail became an important transport route from to the coast to the agricultural region known as the Darling Downs. Spicers Gap Road used to carry supplies to and from the Darling Downs, is the best remaining example of sophisticated 19th century engineering in Queensland. An inn was built in the area to cater for travellers. After the railway to the Darling Downs via Toowoomba was established the road was used less often.

A good view to the north can be seen from Governors Chair Lookout, a short walk from the car park. Lord Kerr, Lord Scott, Sir Charles Fitzroy and Sir George Bowen all sat on the rock in the early 1850s.

== See also ==
- Scenic Rim
