= Main Range National Park =

National park in Queensland, Australia

- IUCN category II (national park)
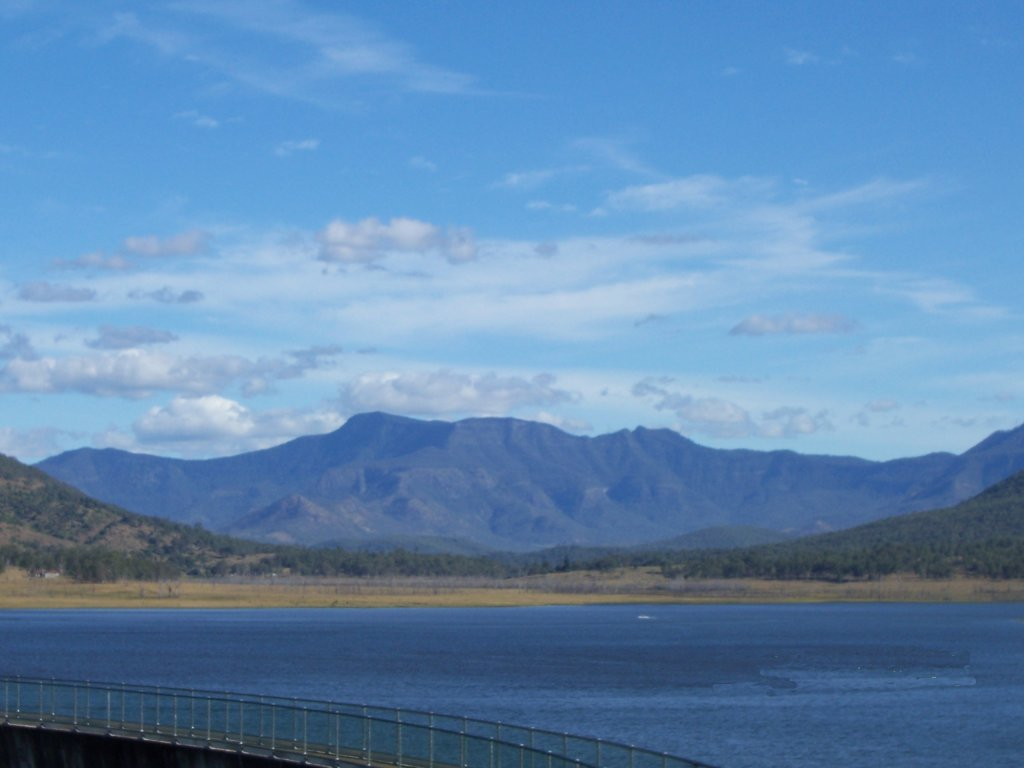
- The forested slopes of Main Range to the south of Lake Moogerah.

- Location within Queensland
- Location: Queensland
- Nearest city: Warwick
- Coordinates: 28°02′46″S 152°23′52″E
- Area: 301.7 km^{2} (116.5 sq mi)
- Established: 1965
- Governing body: Queensland Parks and Wildlife Service
- Website: Official website

The Main Range is a mountain range and national park in Queensland, Australia, located predominantly in Tregony, Southern Downs Region, 85 kilometres (53 mi) southwest of Brisbane. It is part of the World Heritage Site Gondwana Rainforests of Australia (formerly known as the Central Eastern Rainforest Reserves). It protects the western part of a semicircle of mountains in South East Queensland known as the Scenic Rim. This includes the largest area of rainforest in South East Queensland. The park is part of the Scenic Rim Important Bird Area, identified as such by BirdLife International because of its importance in the conservation of several species of threatened birds.

== Description ==
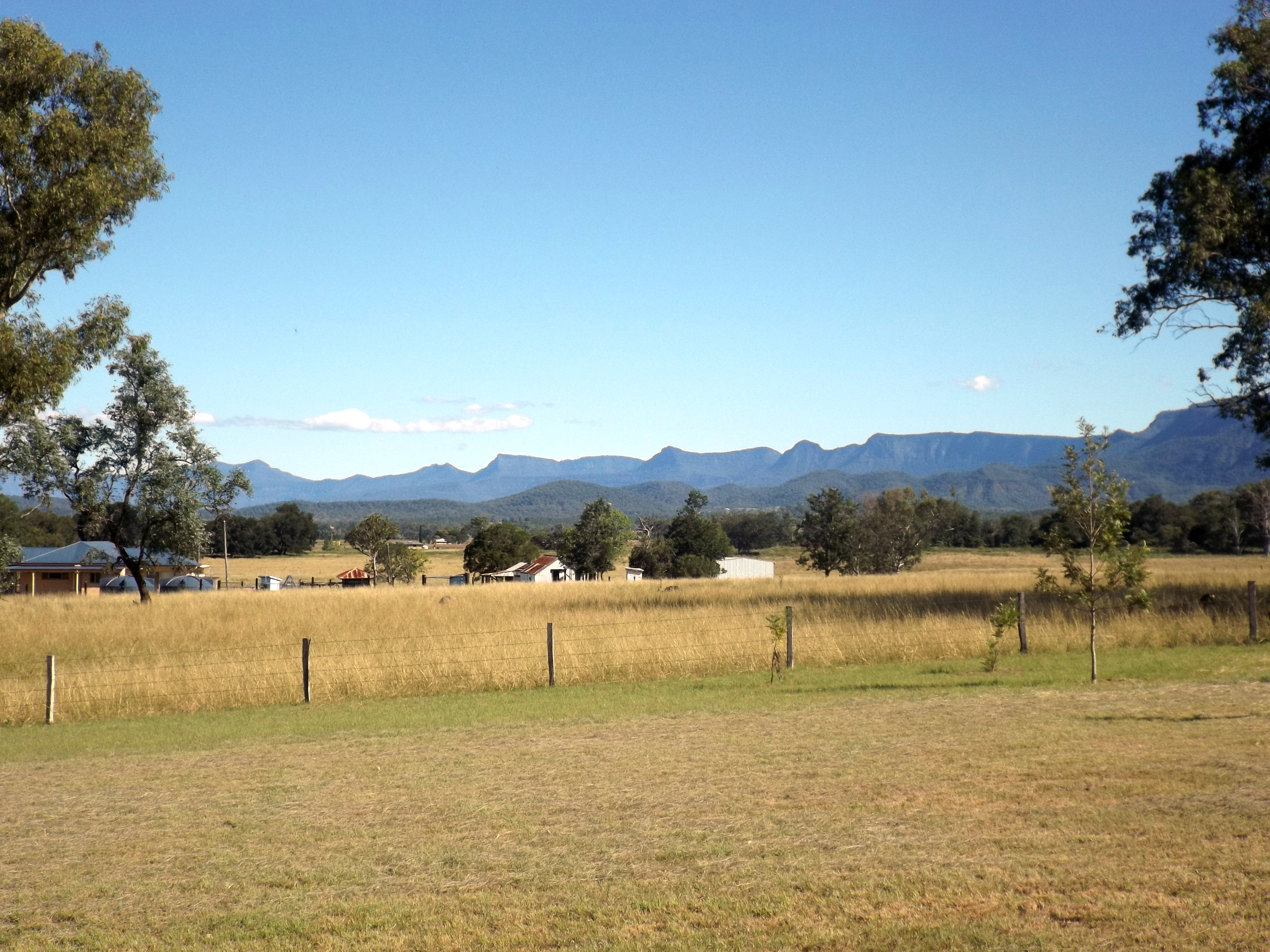
Main Range including Cunninghams Gap viewed from Rosevale, 2015

The park extends from Kangaroo Mountain, near Frazerview, south to Wilsons Peak on the New South Wales border and includes Mount Superbus (1,375 m), South East Queensland’s highest peak.

Bare Rock, Mount Cordeaux, Mount Mitchell, Spicers Peak, Mount Huntley, Mount Asplenium, Mount Steamer, The Steamer Range, Lizard Point, Mount Roberts, Mount Mistake and Mount Superbus all lie within the Main Range National Park. In total, there are more than 40 peaks higher than 1,000 m.

There are walking tracks, camping areas and picnic facilities at a number of places such as Spicers Gap, Cunninghams Gap and Queen Mary Falls.

=== Geology ===
The Main Range Volcanics are thought to be remains of a widespread lava field that probably had multiple simultaneous eruptive centres.

The Main Range shield volcano erupted between 25 and 22 million years ago in the Tertiary period. Rather than forming a central peak, the volcano erupted through numerous basalt dykes that created horizontal lava flows; these are mainly basalt but also sometimes consist of trachyte. These flows now form the bulk of the Main Range, Little Liverpool Range and Mistake Range, and once covered a much wider area that includes both the Lockyer Valley and Fassifern Valley.

=== Flora and fauna ===
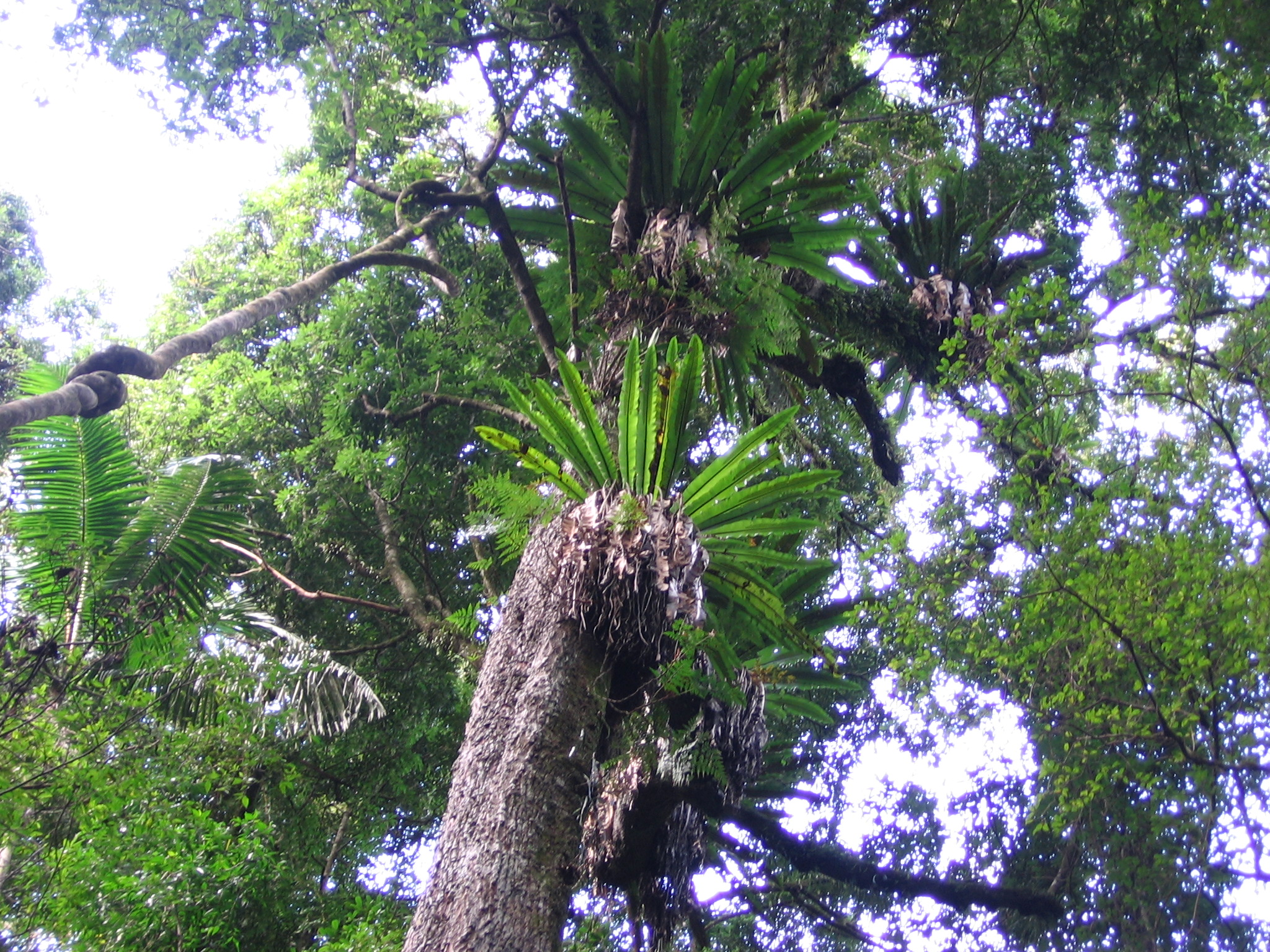
Goomburra Forest Reserve became part of the national park in 1994.

The steeper slopes have avoided any land clearing, acting as a refuge for wildlife in the region. The most predominant vegetation types on the range is sub-tropical rainforest and dry sclerophyll forest. The park's forests and montane heath provide habitat for many animals, including the eastern bristlebird, Coxen's fig parrot, and the black-breasted buttonquail, all of which are threatened by extinction. The vulnerable and rare red goshawk may also be seen.

The giant barred frog, Fleay's barred frog, spotted-tailed quoll and the Hastings River mouse are listed as endangered species, once more commonly found in the Goomburra section of the park.

== History ==
Spicers Gap is believed to be a traditional pathway for Indigenous Australians travelling between the inland and the coast.

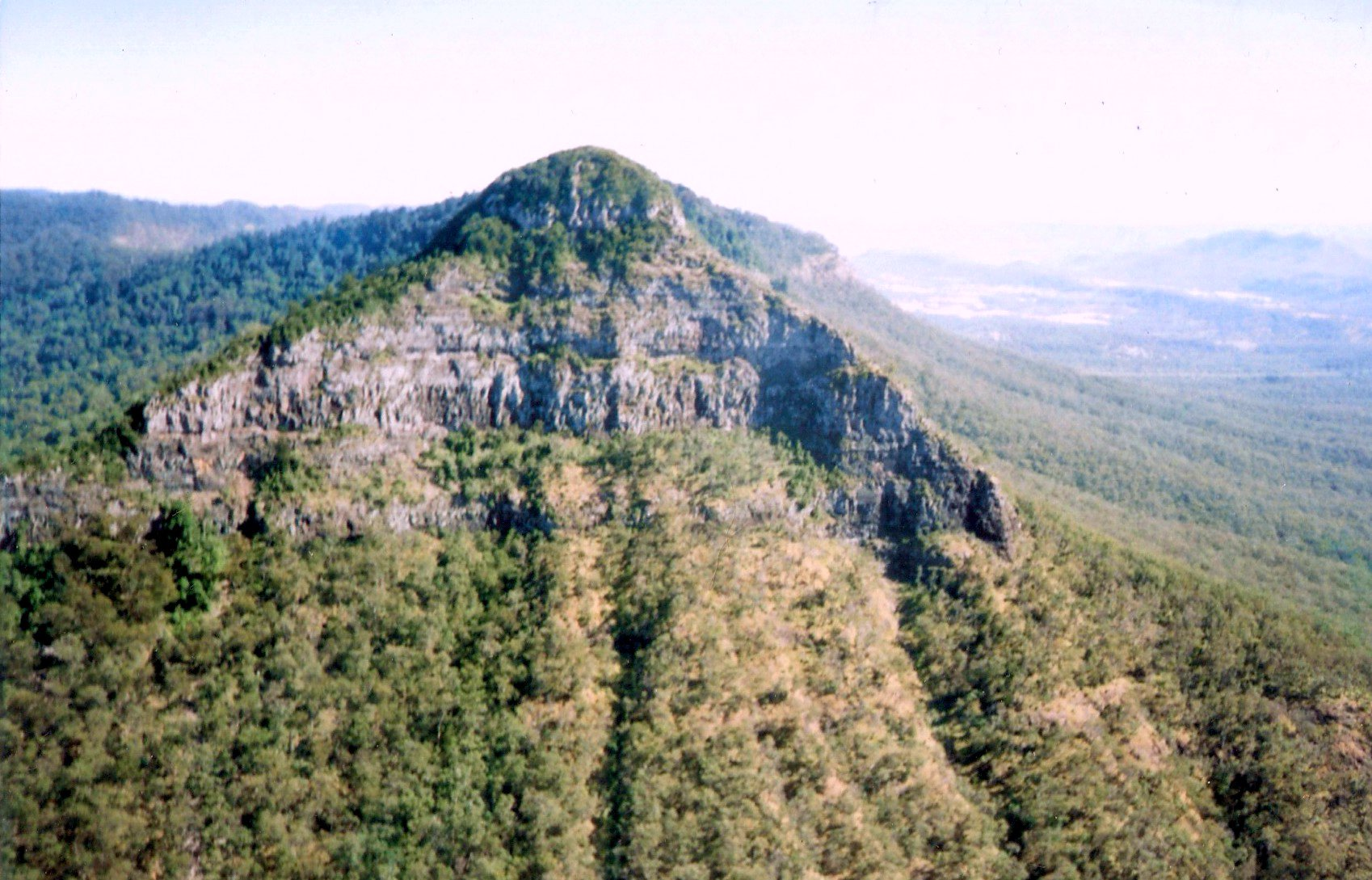
Near Cunninghams Gap, Mount Mitchell rises to an elevation of 1168 m.

In 1828, Allan Cunningham 'officially' discovered the route through the mountains now called Cunninghams Gap; however, it can be easily seen from Brisbane. Stockman Henry Alphen discovered Spicers Gap in 1847. The Spicers Gap Road, used to carry supplies to and from the Darling Downs, is the best remaining example of sophisticated 19th-century engineering in Queensland.

In 1840, George Elphinstone Dalrymple settled in the Goomburra Valley. Dalrymple Creek was named after this early settler. By 1847, a new road through Spicers Gap was opening areas for settlers. In 1909, the area surrounding Cunninghams Gap was declared a national park. In 1994, the UNESCO World Heritage Committee extended the Central Eastern Rainforest Reserves of Australia to include Goomburra Forest Reserve within Main Range National Park. In 2007, the Gondwana Rainforests of Australia was added to the Australian National Heritage List.

== Heritage listings ==
In 1994, the UNESCO World Heritage Committee extended the Central Eastern Rainforest Reserves of Australia to include Goomburra Forest Reserve within Main Range National Park. In 2007, the Gondwana Rainforests of Australia was added to the Australian National Heritage List.

Main Range National Park has a number of heritage-listed sites, including Spicers Gap Road now within the Spicers Gap Road Conservation Park

== See also ==
- McPherson Range
- Protected areas of Queensland
- Spicers Gap Road Conservation Park
